= Atlantic slave trade =

Slave trade between Africa and the West

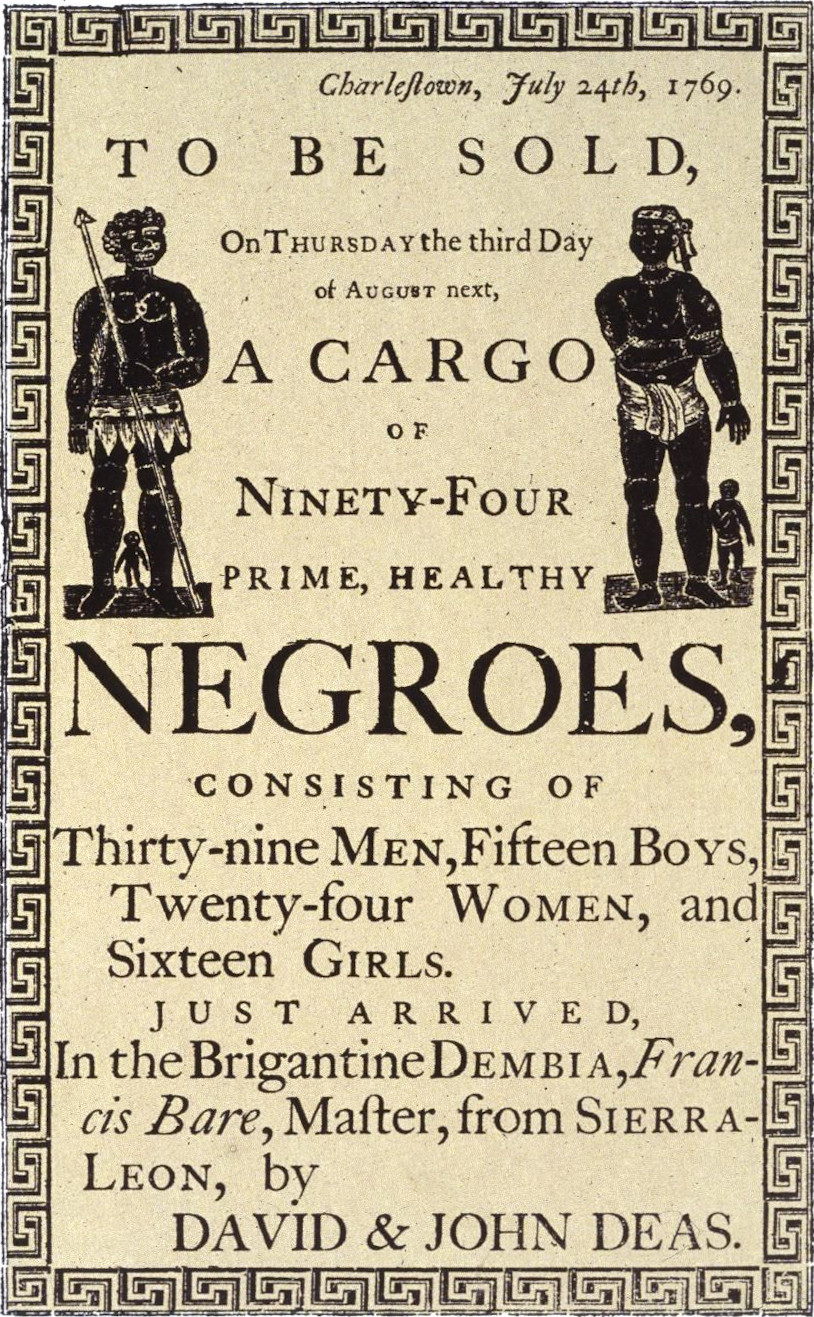
Reproduction of a handbill advertising a slave auction in Charleston, British Province of South Carolina, in 1769

The Atlantic slave trade, also referred to as transatlantic slave trade (or trans-Atlantic slave trade), involved the transportation by slave traders of enslaved African people to the Americas. This trade was operated by slave ships from both Europe and the New World. Some voyages used the triangular trade route and its Middle Passage, particularly in the early phases. Europeans established a coastal slave trade in the 15th century, and trade to the Americas began in the 16th century, (Note: The earliest known direct slave voyage from Africa to the New World was in 1519, carrying just eight enslaved Africans from Guinea to Puerto Rico. Earlier voyages had taken Africans via Spain or Portugal. The first voyage to Brazil, by far the largest recipient of slaves, ultimately making up about 40% of the trade, was in 1560.) lasting well into the 19th century.

Most of the people transported in the transatlantic trade were from Central and West Africa. In contrast to the practice in other slave trades, those who were taking slaves from Africa generally purchased their cargoes from West and Central African slave merchants. This applied to Europeans in the transatlantic trade and Arab slave traders supplying their own markets. While Europeans were involved in some raiding, this was uncommon and discouraged. The Portuguese built barracoons in their African slaving bases to gather newly purchased captives ready for the next ship to arrive. Northern Europeans operated some forts (Note: The forts on the coast of present-day Ghana are well known, but are exceptions to the commonest method of operation by Northern Europeans. This region was called the Gold Coast, and from 1470 to 1690, the forts were used as a base for buying gold. Slave trading here was discouraged, as it interfered with that in gold. The only significant movement of slaves was the African gold miners buying slaves gathered from other parts of Africa by the Portuguese. The Gold Coast forts only came into use in the slave trade in the relatively short period from 1690 until abolition in 1807. In contrast, elsewhere, dedicated slave trading bases were built on islands to provide better defence against attack – Gorée is the well-known example. The Gold Coast forts were an additional expense for slave traders. The resident Europeans relied on their African neighbours for supplies of food, firewood and other necessities, which they had to buy at whatever price was demanded. As slave trading got underway in the area, most ships did not buy their human cargo through the company-owned forts, instead using independent merchants.) as African bases, originally for trading in gold, but later for slaves. However, the usual approach of North European slave traders was to use their ship as a base in which to gather their cargo. This meant these ships spent much longer on the African coast than Portuguese vessels, and the first slaves the slavers bought endured longer confinement on board.

The Americas had, after Australia, a much lower population density than other inhabited continents. Exploitation by the European conquerors of these lands needed a workforce, but the sparse indigenous population was shrinking due to European diseases. Demand for labour could not be met by Europeans, who were reluctant to emigrate at this early stage. The solution was the same as was used for the sugar plantations of Madeira and the Canary Islands c. 1450: slaves brought from sub-Saharan Africa.

African slaves were sold in the Americas to work on coffee, tobacco, cocoa, sugar, and cotton plantations, rice fields, as well as in gold and silver mines, the construction industry, cutting of timber for ships, and as skilled labor or domestic servants. The first enslaved Africans sent to the English colonies were classified as indentured servants, with legal standing similar to contract-based workers from Britain and Ireland. However, by the middle of the 17th century, this had become a racial caste system of chattel slavery, in which African slaves and their future offspring were legally the property of their owners, and children born to slave mothers were also deemed to be slaves according to the legal doctrine of partus sequitur ventrem. As property, the people were considered merchandise or units of labour, and sold at markets with other goods and services, their prices determined by their health and expected productivity.

The major Atlantic slave trading nations, in order of trade volume, were Portugal, Britain, Spain, France, the Netherlands, the United States, and Denmark. The largest slave trading ports were in South America, with New World-based ships probably carrying more enslaved people from Africa than those travelling in ships with a home port in Europe. The current estimate is that about 12.75 million Africans were loaded onto slave ships for transportation to the Americas. Of these, up to 2 million died during the voyage. About 8 million Africans were enslaved and remained on the African continent. Near the beginning of the 19th century, various governments acted to ban the trade, although illegal smuggling still occurred.

== Background ==
=== Slavery in Africa ===
Slavery was prevalent in many parts of Africa for many centuries before the Atlantic slave trade. Claire C Robertson writes that while chattel systems aimed to sustain a permanent underclass available for cheap labor, African slavery "historically did not conform to a typical chattel slavery model but was highly varied, especially for women." Historians of African slavery have now generally absorbed the Miers and Kopytoff concept of slavery as a continuum of statuses rather than as a monolith, and have discarded the idea of chattel slavery as the paradigm of all slavery. Slavery remained a significant part of the African economy after slave exports declined and then collapsed in the second half of the 19th century. Consequently, slaves were used more widely in the African economy.

Millions of enslaved Africans were transported to other parts of Africa, or exported to Europe and Asia prior to the Atlantic slave trade and the European colonization of the Americas. The Trans-Saharan slave trade across the Sahara had functioned since antiquity, and continued until the 20th-century. Slaves from eastern Sudan, Somalia, and Ethiopia were marched in shackles to the coast and packed into dhows and trafficked across the Red Sea or the Gulf of Aden to markets in Arabia, the Persian Gulf, and the Indian Ocean.

Yves Beigbeder says 5.15 million slaves were sold in Muslim countries from the 16th to the 19th centuries, and cites Roger Botte's estimate that until the 20th century from 12 to 15 million Africans were sold in the Arab slave trade. Raymond Mauny estimates a total of 14 million Black slaves were traded in Muslim countries through the 20th century, including 300,000 for part of the 20th century.

According to John K. Thornton, Europeans usually bought enslaved people who had been captured in endemic warfare between African states. People living around the Niger River would be transported from these markets to the coast and sold in European trading ports, in exchange for muskets and manufactured goods such as cloth or alcohol. The European demand for slaves provided a new and larger market for the already existing trade. While those held as slaves in their region of Africa could hope to escape, those shipped away had little chance of returning to their homeland.

=== Slavery in Portugal and Spain ===
Slavery had existed in Portugal and Spain throughout recorded history. The Roman Empire had established its system of slavery in ancient times. Benjamin Isaac posits a proto-racism that existed among Greco-Roman people, referring to Aristotle's statement in his Politics that "slaves are subhuman or lesser men while masters are superior", to justify the inferior status of slaves. Since the fall of the Western Roman Empire, systems of slavery continued in the successor Islamic and Christian kingdoms of the Iberian Peninsula through the early modern era of the Atlantic slave trade. Arlindo Caldeira writes that in 1444, six caravels belonging to a consortium of seamen and merchants docked in Lagos with a cargo of 235 enslaved men, women, and children who had been captured in the Bay of Arguin in what is today Mauritania. These were mostly Muslim Berbers, but also, for the first time, included black-skinned people, likely from sub-Saharan Africa, who had been brought to North Africa over the Trans-Saharan caravan routes. Caldeira says "historians recognized this episode as the beginning of the Atlantic slave trade", although ships in Prince Henry the Navigator's fleet had been bringing enslaved persons from West Africa since 1441. The Portuguese established their first trading post as early as 1448 at Arguin, and in 1455 built a fortress to defend the Portuguese merchants settled there.

A map of the Spanish Empire (red) and Portuguese Empires (blue) in the period of their personal union (1581–1640)

In the Middle Ages, religion and not race was a determining factor for who was considered to be a legitimate target of slavery. Christians did not enslave Christians and Muslims did not enslave Muslims. White slavery was notable throughout the 14th and 15th centuries, and white slaves were one of the largest slave populations. The slaves sold in Spain during medieval times came from the Black Sea area and the Balkans via the Balkan slave trade and the Black Sea slave trade.

In the 15th century, the Balkan slave trade was taken over by the Ottoman Empire, and the Black Sea slave trade, supplanted by the Crimean slave trade, was closed off from Europe. Spain and Portugal replaced this source of slaves by importing slaves from the conquered Canary Islands and then from mainland Africa. The mainland trade was initially carried on by Arab slave traders, via the Trans-Saharan slave trade from Libya, and then from the African West coast through Portuguese outposts, eventually developing into the Atlantic slave trade and expanding after the establishment of plantations in the Americas.

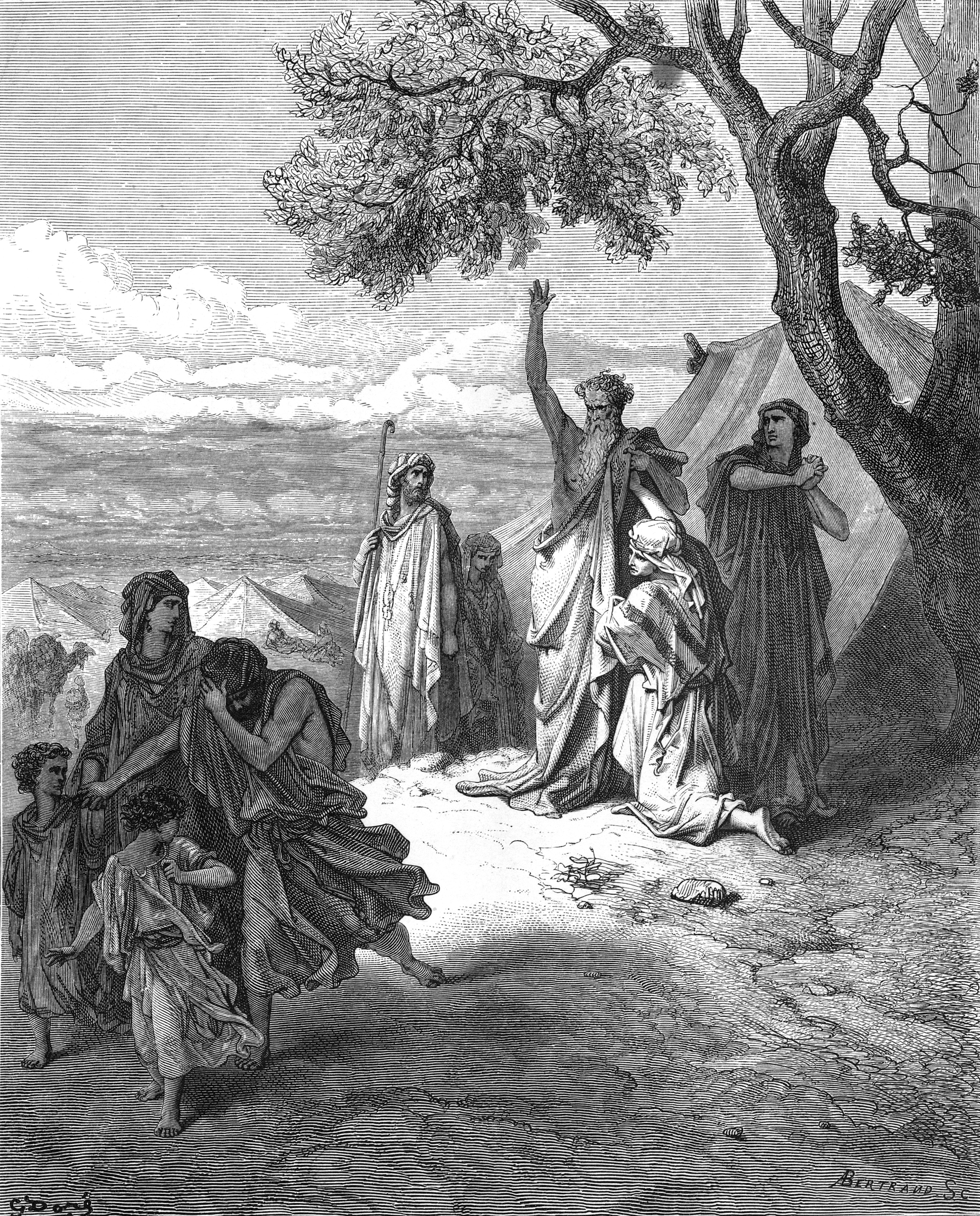
Noah curses Ham by Gustave Doré – the curse of Ham was used as a justification to enslave Africans.

The philosopher Julia Jorati writes that Jewish, Muslim, and Christian scholars began invoking the curse of Ham to justify the enslavement of Africans at least as early as the 10h century, long before the existence of the transatlantic slave trade. She cites the 15th-century Portuguese chronicler Gomes Eanes de Zurara, who, in his Chronicle of the Discovery and Conquest of Guinea (Crónica dos feitos da Guiné) composed in the early 1450s, claims that Black people are enslaved "in accordance with ancient custom, which I believe to have been because of the curse which, after the Deluge, Noah laid upon his son Cain [sic], cursing him in this way:—that his race should be subject to all the other races of the world." According to Colin A. Palmer, it appears that by the 15th century the majority of slaves in Spain were of African descent, most of them living in Andalusia, especially Seville. While the early Portuguese and Spanish authorities justified slavery as a means to Christianise Africans, the nature of New World slavery was racialised by European traders and settlers who had few scruples about the enslavement of "heathens" or their conversion.

In 1452, Pope Nicholas V issued the papal bull Dum Diversas which gave the King of Portugal the right to enslave non-Christians in perpetual slavery. Thomas says, "This clause was obviously intended to include the natives of West Africa." In 1454, Pope Nicholas issued Romanus Pontifex, which laid the foundation for doctrines supportive of empire building. Palmer says, "In 1479 the Spaniards signed the Treaty of Alcáçovas with the Portuguese, granting traders in that country the right to supply Spaniards with enslaved Africans."

According to Thomas, conversos, former Jews who had been forcibly converted to Christianity, financed much of the slave trade in Lisbon during the 16th and 17th centuries. He writes that one can speculate how far Muslim mullah-merchants controlled the medieval trade in Black Africans across the Sahara before Portuguese ships were seen in West Africa. In New Spain, Spaniards applied the concept of limpieza de sangre (blood purity) to Africans and Native Americans. Believing their ancestries to be impure even though they might be "New Christians", the Spaniards created a racial caste system, with Black blood more often considered a blemish on a person's lineage.

Ellen Yvonne Simms cites Morner's proposition of three main types of social stratification in colonial New Spain: a caste system, in which membership was set by birth, the estate system, a hierarchy in which rank was determined by customs and laws, and a class system based mainly on economic disparity which allowed upward social mobility. According to Simms, their racist ideology enabled the Spaniards to build a society in colonial New Spain based on racial distinctions, with a white Spanish elite minority controlling all its social, economic, and political aspects, and dominating a large indigenous population alongside the numerous enslaved Blacks who remained at the bottom of the social hierarchy.

=== Atlantic exploration and travel ===
The Atlantic slave trade developed after trade contacts were established between the "Old World" (Afro-Eurasia) and "New World" (the Americas). The ocean currents and prevailing winds of the Atlantic represented a barrier to return travel for seafarers who did not understand their pattern, whilst those with sufficient knowledge could use them as a tool to assist them. In the 15th century, European developments in seafaring technologies produced multi-masted sailing vessels with centre-line rudders, replacing the medieval cog and the Mediterranean round ship. This led to vessels more suited to Atlantic seafaring. Between 1600 and 1800, approximately 300,000 sailors engaged in the slave trade visited West Africa. In doing so, they came into contact with societies along the West African coast and in the Americas which they had never previously encountered. Pierre Chaunu termed the consequences of European navigation désenclavement, with it marking an end of isolation for some societies and an increase in inter-societal contact in maritime regions.

The historian John Thornton notes, "technical and geographical factors combined to make Europeans the most likely people to explore the Atlantic and develop its commerce". He identifies these as being the drive to find profitable commercial opportunities outside Europe. There was the desire to create an alternative trade network to that controlled by the Muslim Ottoman Empire, which was viewed as a commercial, political and religious threat to European Christendom. European traders wanted to trade for gold, which could be found in West Africa, and find a maritime route to "the Indies" (India), where they could trade luxury goods such as spices, without having to obtain them from Muslim traders.

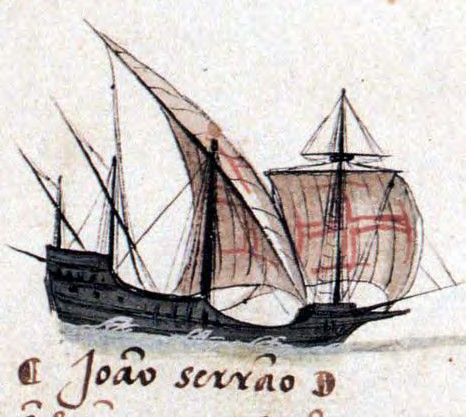
Portuguese mariners used caravel ships and travelled south along the West African coast and colonised Cape Verde in 1462.

European overseas expansion led to contact between the Old and New Worlds, producing the Columbian exchange named after Christopher Columbus. It started the global silver trade from the 16th to 18th centuries, and involved the transfer of goods unique to one hemisphere to the other. Europeans brought cattle, horses, pigs, sheep, and chickens to the New World, and from the New World Europeans received turkeys, tobacco, potatoes, tomatoes, and maize. Other commodities becoming important in trade were the sugarcane, coffee, and cotton crops of the Americas, along with their gold and silver.

During the first wave of European colonisation, although many Atlantic naval explorations were led by the Iberian conquistadors, members of many European nationalities were involved, including from Spain, Portugal, France, England, the Italian states, and the Netherlands. This diversity led Thornton to describe the "exploration of the Atlantic" as "a truly international exercise, even if many of the dramatic discoveries were made under the sponsorship of the Iberian monarchs". That gave rise to the myth that "the Iberians were the sole leaders of the exploration".

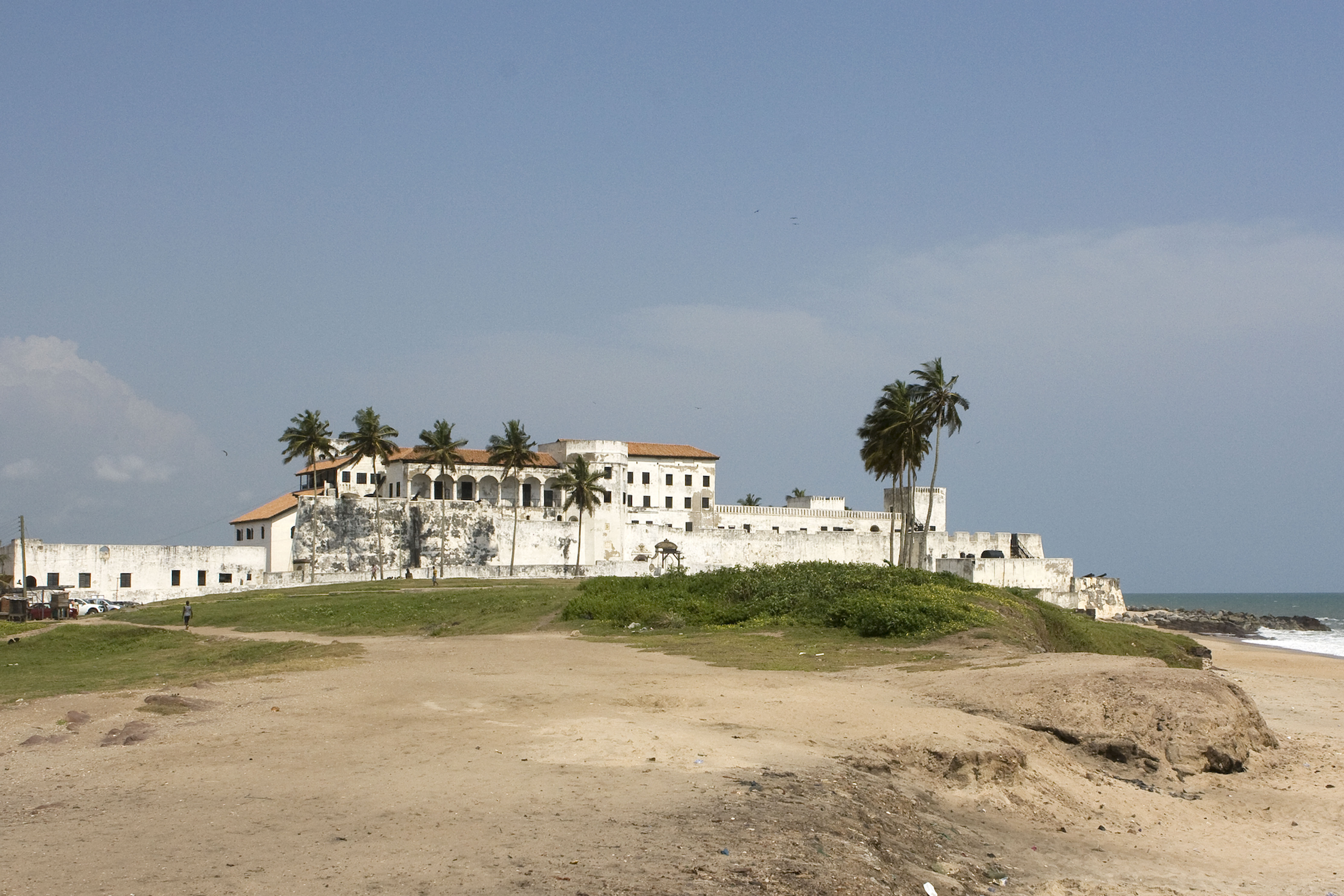
Elmina Castle on the Guinea coast, present-day Ghana, was built in 1482 by Portuguese traders. Its primary purpose was trading in gold, but when the outward slave trade from the Gold Coast began, it was used in the slave trade. The Gold Coast was a late entrant to the outward slave trade (though there was an inward trade to supply workers in the gold mines).

According to Michael A. Gomez, after Muslim rule in Portugal ended in 1250, labourers became scarce when the Muslim populace fled to Granada and the supply of prisoners of war ceased. The Portuguese then began to replace their labour force with West Africans they purchased from Muslim traders. Portuguese activity in the Atlantic trade can be said to have begun with Prince Henry the Navigator, who initiated exploration further south along the West African coast. In 1441 Nuno Tristão and Antão Gonçalves reached Cape Blanc, where they took prisoner eleven Tuareg (Berber) men and one Black woman. The captives were first taken to Portugal and then were returned to West Africa and exchanged for gold dust, ten Black persons, and ostrich eggs.

Upon discovering new lands, European colonisers began to migrate to and settle in lands outside their native continent. Off the coast of Africa, European migrants, under the directions of the Kingdom of Castile, invaded and colonised the Canary Islands in the 14th and 15th centuries. The Portuguese captured native Canary Islanders, the Guanches, to use as slaves on the islands and across the Christian Mediterranean, later followed by Castilian-Spanish colonists who expanded agricultural operations, and by 1529 the islands were producing cattle and sheep products along with sugar and wines.

Thornton remarks, "the actual motivation for European expansion and for navigational breakthroughs was little more than to exploit the opportunity for immediate profits made by raiding and the seizure or purchase of trade commodities". Using the Canary Islands as a naval base, Europeans moved their activities down the west coast of Africa, performing raids in which slaves would be captured to be sold in the Mediterranean. Although initially successful, "it was not long before African naval forces were alerted to the new dangers, and the Portuguese [raiding] ships began to meet strong and effective resistance", with the crews of several being killed by African sailors, whose boats were better equipped at traversing the west-central African coasts and river systems. From 1460 to 1500, the removal of Africans increased as Portugal and Spain built forts along the coast of West Africa. The enslaved Africans worked as domestic servants, artisans, and farmers. Other Africans were taken to work the sugar plantations on the Azores, Madeira, and the Canary and Cape Verde islands. Europeans participated in African enslavement for religious, labour, and profit motives.

Ivana Elbl says that "although slaves were the most common merchandise in the Portuguese-dominated opening period of the seaborne trade between Europe and Africa, relatively little conclusive information is available on their overall numbers." She has attempted to reconstruct annual export volumes for the period 1450–1521 from contemporary records including customs registers of the Portuguese Crown and trade ledgers, and gives an estimated total volume of this early Atlantic Slave Trade as an average of 2,164 slaves shipped per year and a total of 155,800 for the period.

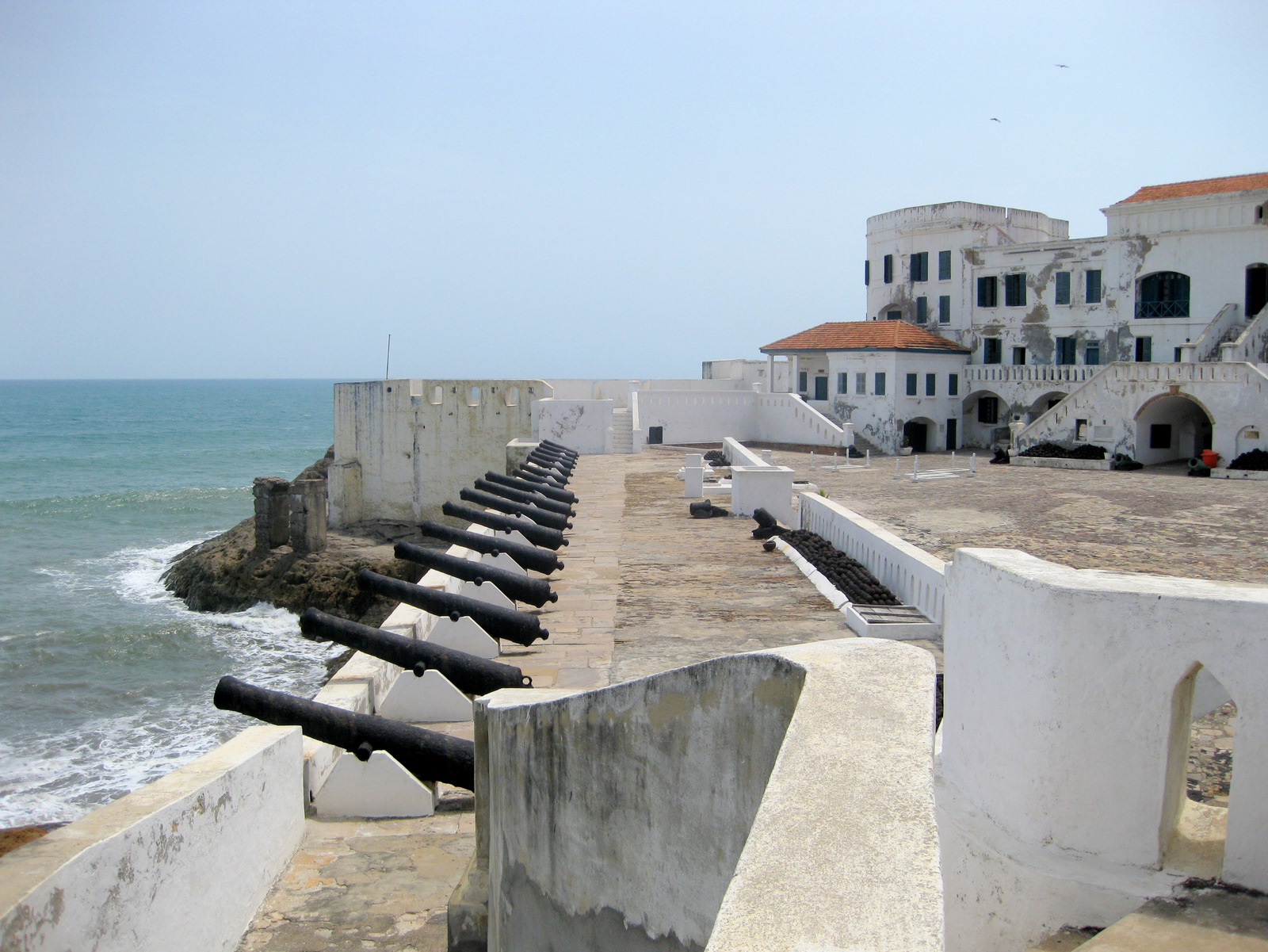
Beginning as a Portuguese trading post in 1555, the Cape Coast Castle was built by the Swedish African Company as a wooden fort and trading post in 1653. It was taken by the British in 1664 and rebuilt in stone.

By 1494, the Portuguese king had entered agreements with the rulers of West African states that allowed trade, enabling the Portuguese to connect with the "well-developed commercial economy in Africa ... without engaging in hostilities". "Peaceful trade became the rule all along the African coast", although there were exceptions when aggression led to violence. For instance, Portuguese traders attempted to conquer the Bissagos Islands in 1535.

Other European nations followed the examples of Spain and Portugal. In 1530, an English merchant from Plymouth, William Hawkins, visited the Guinea Coast and left with slaves. In 1564, Hawkin's son John Hawkins sailed to the Guinea Coast; his voyage was supported by Elizabeth I. He sailed with four ships crewed by only 150 men, and acquired more than 400 slaves on the coast of Sierra Leone, partly by direct capture and partly by purchase from the Portuguese. He left the African coast on 29 January 1565, and reached Borburata in Venezuela on 3 April.

In 1571, Portugal, supported by the Kingdom of Kongo, took control of the southwest region of Angola to secure its threatened economic interest in the area. Although Kongo joined a coalition in 1591 to force the Portuguese out, Portugal had secured a foothold that it occupied until the 20th century. Despite these incidents of violence between African and European forces, many African states ensured trade went on in their own terms, by imposing custom duties on foreign ships. For example, in 1525, the Kongolese King Afonso I seized a French vessel and its crew for illegally trading on his coast. Afonso complained to the king of Portugal that Portuguese slave traders continued to kidnap his people, causing depopulation.

The historian David Eltis has generated a dataset to draw the broad outlines of the transatlantic slave trade by reconstructing transatlantic links. He submits that if his estimates of the traffic are correct, then more than half of all Portuguese slaving voyages are included. His data indicates the total number of slaves carried to the Americas in Portuguese vessels during the period 1601–1650 as 439,500, derived by adding 252,000 departures for the Spanish Americas and 187,500 for Brazil. This total would be reduced by an estimated 20 percent mortality rate on the shorter South Atlantic route.

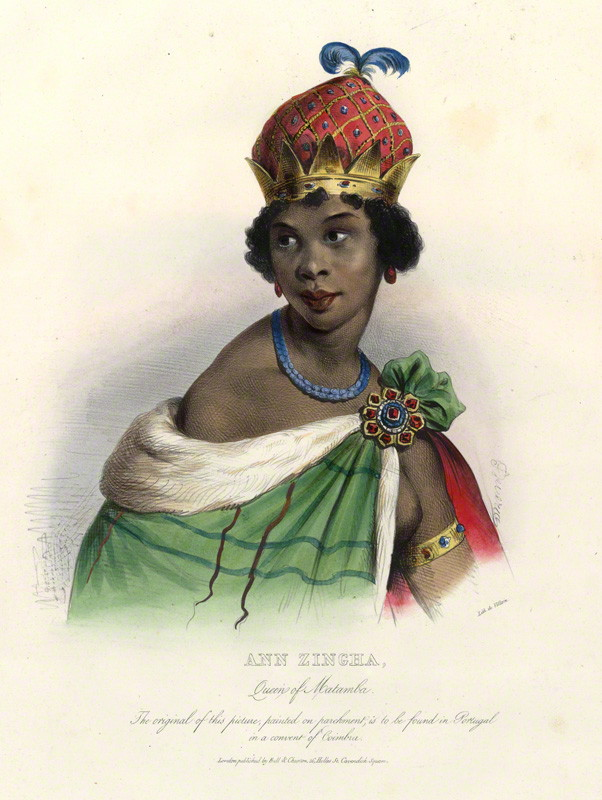
Nzinga of Ndongo and Matamba fought against the expansion of the Portuguese Empire in a thirty-year war in present-day Angola.

Nzinga, who ruled as queen of the Ambundu Kingdoms of Ndongo (1624–1663) and Matamba (1631–1663) in present-day Angola, fought a war against the Portuguese Empire's expansion. Initially, Nzinga accommodated the Portuguese. She converted to Christianity and repositioned the Ndongo Kingdom as an intermediary in the slave trade, rather than a source for slaves. This provided her with an ally against hostile neighbouring African Kingdoms; however, the Portuguese continued to encroach on her kingdom to expand their slave trade and establish settlements. Nzinga called for an end to the raids, but the Portuguese declared war on Ndongo in 1626. She allowed sanctuary to runaway slaves from Portuguese controlled territory and organised a youth military organization called kilombo against them. Within two years, her army was defeated and she went into exile. She later conquered the Kingdom of Matamba and entered into an alliance with the Dutch West India Company and former rival African states. With their help, Nzinga was able to reclaim large parts of Ndongo between 1641 and 1647. She continued to fight the Portuguese until a peace treaty was signed in 1656.

Historians have long debated the nature of the relationship between African kingdoms and European traders. The Guyanese historian Walter Rodney (1972) argued it was an unequal relationship, with Africans being forced into a "colonial" trade with the more economically developed Europeans, exchanging raw materials and slaves for manufactured goods. He argued it was this trade dating back to the 16th century that led to Africa being underdeveloped in his time. This idea of an unequal relationship was contested by John Thornton, who argued that "the Atlantic slave trade was not nearly as critical to the African economy as these scholars believed" and "African manufacturing [at this period] was more than capable of handling competition from preindustrial Europe". However, Anne Bailey, commenting on Thornton's suggestion that Africans and Europeans were equal partners in the Atlantic slave trade, wrote:

[T]o to see Africans as partners implies equal terms and equal influence on the global and intercontinental processes of the trade. This was simply not the case. Africans had great influence on the processes of enslavement on the continent itself, but they had no direct influence on the engines behind the trade in the capital firms, the shipping and insurance companies of Europe and America, or on the plantation system in the Americas. Likewise, they did not wield any influence on the budding manufacturing centers of the West.

== 16th, 17th, and 18th centuries ==
The first enslaved Africans arrived in continental North America in the 16th century, often with European explorers. They continued to arrive in limited numbers, not only from Africa but also from Europe, the Caribbean islands, and other Atlantic coastal regions. During the first Atlantic slave trade system, most of the slavers were Portuguese, giving Portugal a near-monopoly. The Treaty of Tordesillas did not allow Spanish ships in African ports. Spain relied on Portuguese ships and sailors to bring slaves across the Atlantic. From 1525, slaves were transported directly from the Portuguese colony of Sao Tomé across the Atlantic to Hispaniola. According to Matthew Restall, by the late 1530s there were probably a thousand Blacks in greater Peru, and possibly twice that number by the mid-1540s. Despite the fact that the Spanish civil wars of the 1540s may have slowed imports of slaves and the emigration of Black auxiliaries from Panama, there were some 3,000 Blacks in Peru by the 1550s.

In 1562, John Hawkins initiated the English slave trade when he sailed as far south on the Guinea coast as Sierra Leone, and according to Hakluyt captured 300 Africans that he transported across the Atlantic to Hispaniola. In 1564, he repeated the voyage, this time using one of the largest ships in Queen Elizabeth's navy, the dry rot-riddled Jesus of Lübeck, and realised a good profit. He sailed on a third voyage in 1567, which, although it ended in disaster with only 15 or so survivors among a crew of 408, was a financial success, with nearly all its treasure of gold, silver, and pearls arriving safely in Plymouth.

Around 1560, the Portuguese began a slave trade to Brazil. From 1580 until 1640, Portugal was temporarily united with Spain in the Iberian Union. Most Portuguese contractors who obtained the asiento between 1580 and 1640 were conversos. For Portuguese merchants, many of whom were "New Christians" or their descendants, the union of crowns presented commercial opportunities in the slave trade to Spanish America. Portuguese New Christians increasingly allied themselves with the Jewish merchants who dominated the slave trade in Dutch Brazil.

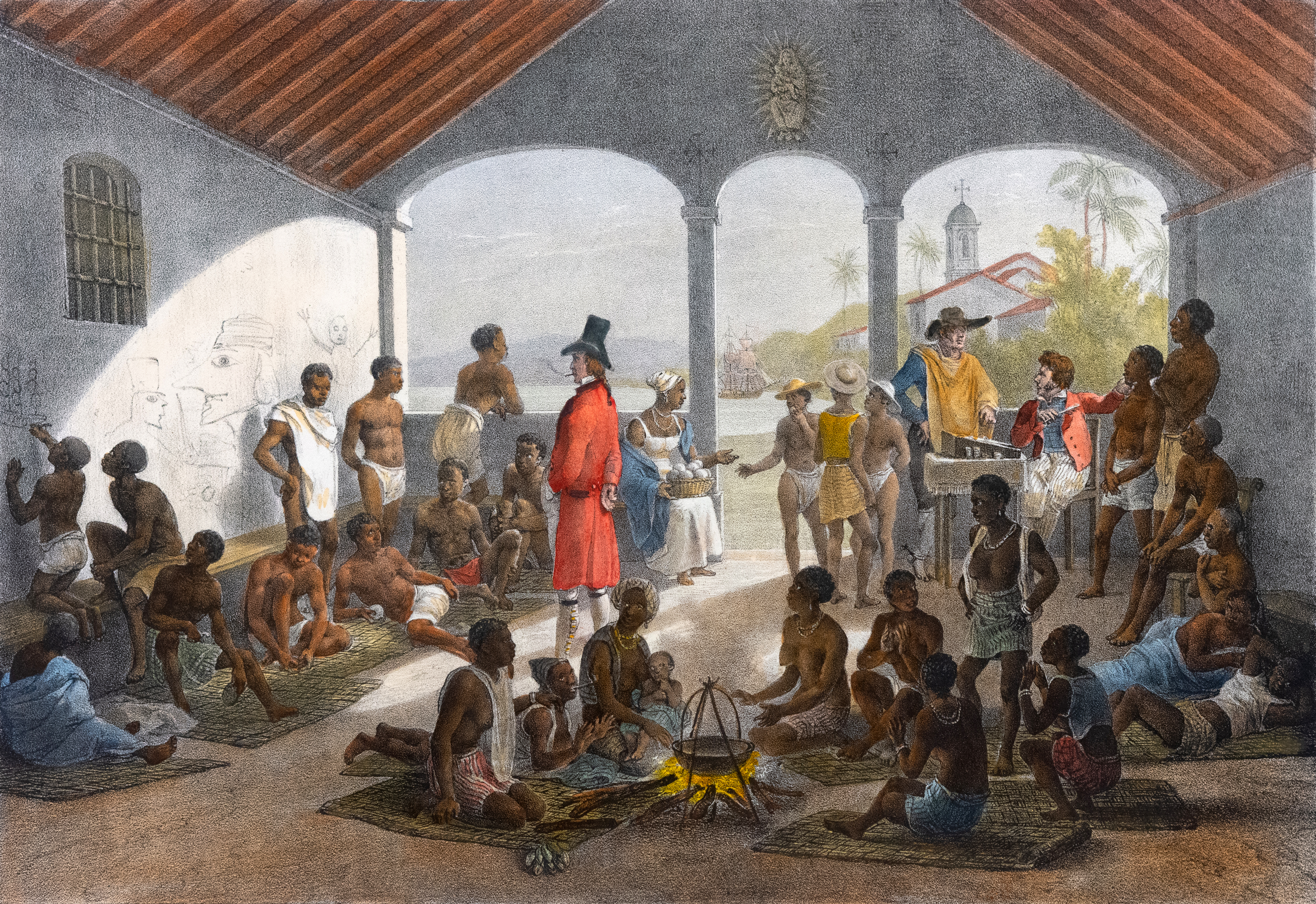
A slave market in Brazil

Until the middle of the 17th century, Mexico was the largest market for slaves in Spanish America. While the Portuguese were directly involved in trading enslaved people to Brazil, the Spanish Empire relied on the Asiento de Negros system, awarding Genoese merchant bankers the license to trade slaves from Africa to their colonies in Spanish America. Cartagena, Veracruz, Buenos Aires, and Hispaniola received most slave arrivals, mainly from Angola. This division of the slave trade between Spain and Portugal upset the British and Dutch who invested in the British West Indies and Dutch Brazil producing sugar. After the Iberian Union fell apart, Spain prohibited Portugal from directly engaging in the slave trade as a carrier. Despite the ban, however, the Portuguese continued to indirectly supply the Spanish American slave trade.

From 1641 to 1789, Spanish transatlantic traffic was operating at trivial levels. In many years, not a single Spanish slave voyage set sail from Africa. The slave trade was opened to the traditional enemies of Spain, causing Spain to lose a large share to the Dutch, French, and English. Unlike all their imperial competitors, the Spanish almost never delivered slaves to foreign territories. Over the course of the Spanish transatlantic slave trade, Spanish slave ships disembarked more than one million captive Africans in the Americas, with Spanish ships transporting four times more Africans than did their counterparts in the US.

In 1672, the Royal Africa Company was founded. In 1674, the New West India Company became more deeply involved in the slave trade. From 1677 the Compagnie du Sénégal used Gorée to house the slaves. That same year the Spanish proposed to get slaves directly from the Dutch West India Company's posts off the coast of Africa, but this was against the Dutch West India Company Charter (1621). The Royal African Company usually refused to deliver slaves to Spanish colonies, though they did sell them to all comers from their factories in Kingston, Jamaica and Bridgetown, Barbados. In 1682, Spain allowed governors from Havana, Porto Bello, Panama, and Cartagena, Colombia to procure slaves from Jamaica.

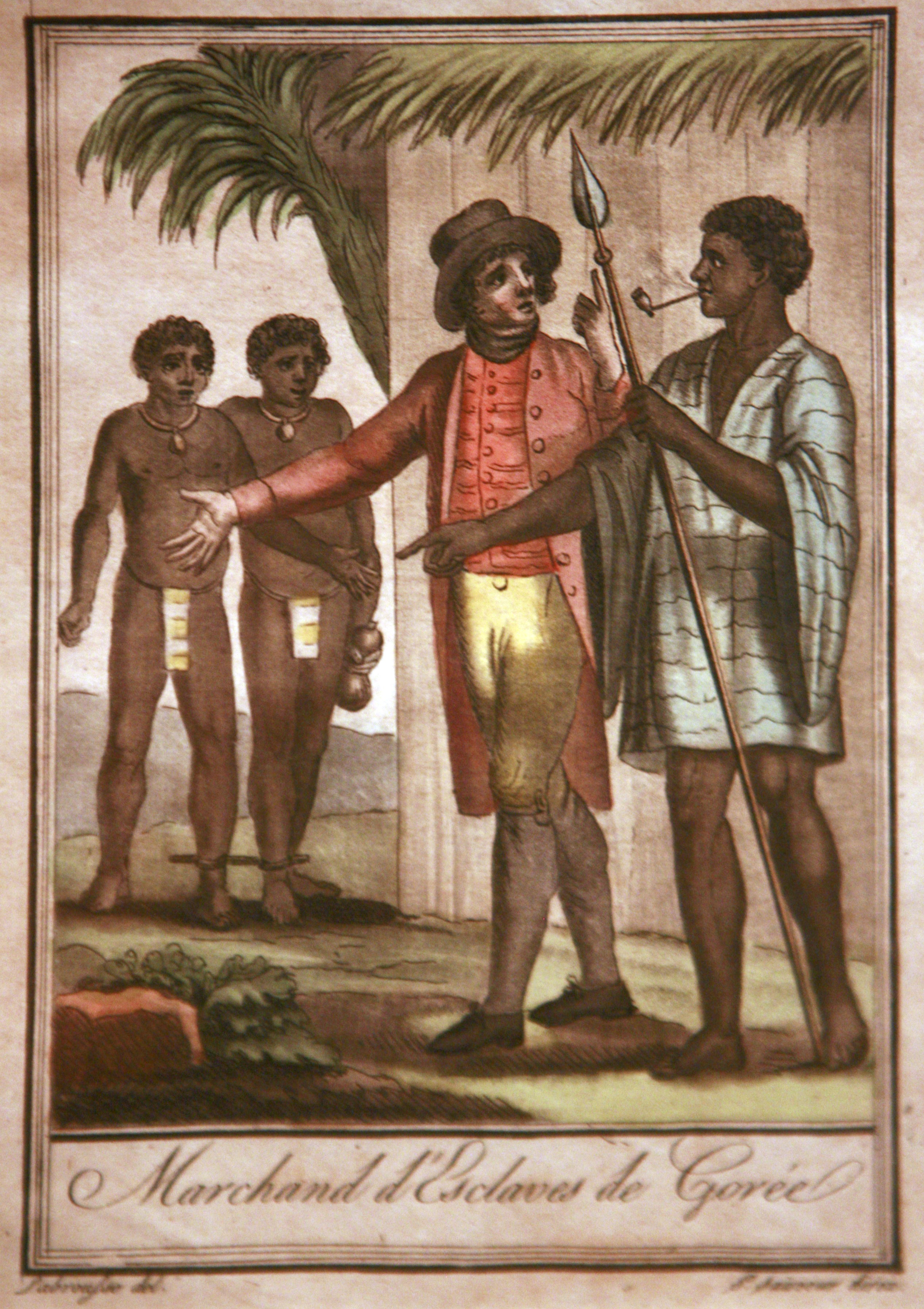
Slave traders in Gorée, Senegal, 18th century

By the 1690s, the English were shipping the most slaves from Guinea. By the 18th century, Portuguese Angola again become one of the principal sources of the slave trade. After the War of the Spanish Succession, as part of the provisions of the Treaty of Utrecht (1713), the Asiento was granted to the South Sea Company. Despite the South Sea Bubble, the British maintained this position during the 18th century, becoming the biggest shipper of slaves across the Atlantic. Most of the slave trade took place during the 18th century, with the Portuguese, British, and French being the main carriers of nine out of ten slaves abducted in Africa. By the mid-18th century, French Saint-Domingue was the predominant island in the Caribbean. It produced the most sugar of any colony in the Americas, and held the largest slave population in the West Indies. Slave trading was regarded as crucial to Europe's maritime economy, as noted by an English slave trader: "What a glorious and advantageous trade this is ... It is the hinge on which all the trade of this globe moves."

Slave trading became a business for privately owned enterprises, reducing international complications. After 1790, captains often compared slave prices in major markets of Kingston, Havana, and Charleston, South Carolina before deciding where to sell. For the last sixteen years of the transatlantic slave trade, Spain was the only transatlantic slave-trading empire. Following the British Slave Trade Act 1807 and U.S. bans on the African slave trade, it declined, but the period thereafter still accounted for a substantial portion of the Atlantic slave trade. Between 1810 and 1860, over 3.5 million slaves were transported, with 850,000 in the 1820s.

=== Triangular trade ===
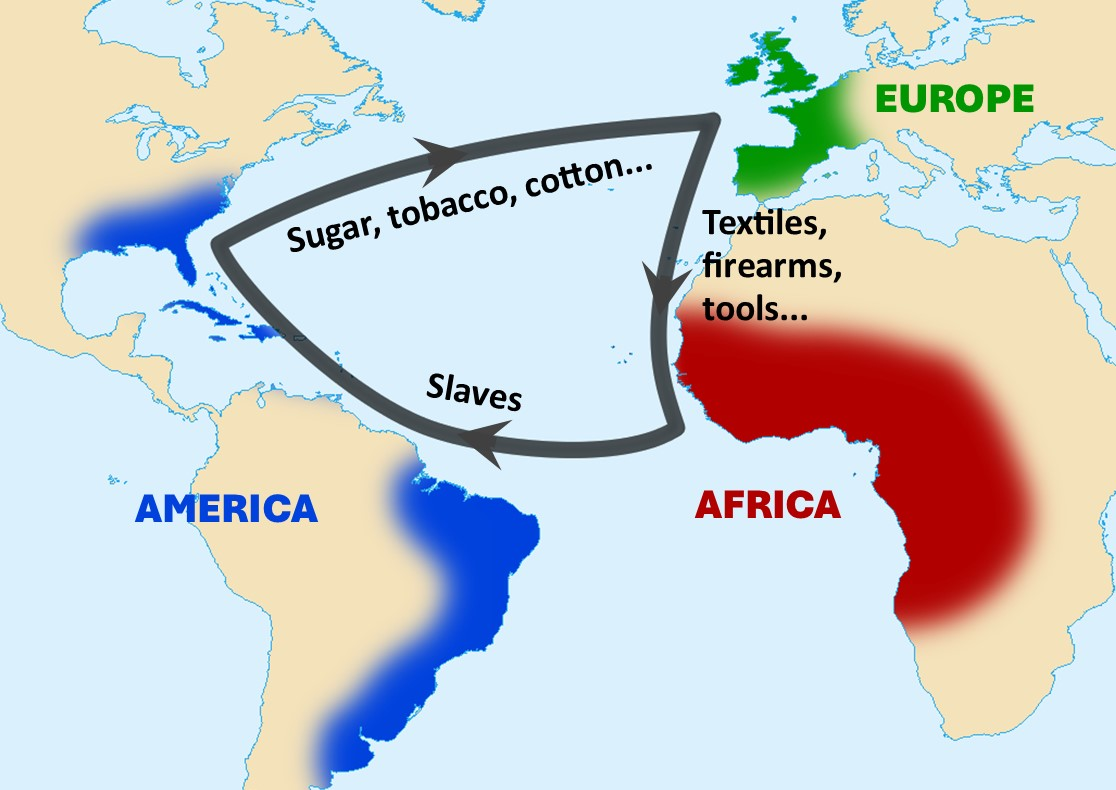
Diagram of triangular trade

The first side of the triangle was the export of goods from Europe to Africa. African kings and merchants took part in the trading of slaves from 1440 to about 1833. For each captive, the African rulers would receive goods from Europe. These included guns, gunpowder, alcohol, indigo-dyed Indian textiles, and other factory-made goods. The second leg of the triangle, the so-called "Middle Passage", exported enslaved Africans across the Atlantic to the Americas and Caribbean Islands. The third part of the triangle was the return of goods to Europe from the Americas. The goods were the products of slave plantations and included cotton, sugar, tobacco, coffee, molasses, and rum. Sir John Hawkins, often considered the pioneer of the English slave trade, was the first to run the triangular trade route.

Some historians, such as Sophie Campbell, argue that there is over-emphasis on the importance of any triangular trade. Gilman Ostrander denied it was a major factor in colonial commerce and called it a myth. Whilst it was common initially, within 50 years, two-leg voyages to Africa from the Americas started to make up a significant proportion of the whole of the transatlantic slave trade. Though that share fluctuated over time, it is likely that ships based in the New World carried a larger total of enslaved people across the Atlantic from Africa, compared to the numbers moved in ships with a home port in Europe. Ships from the three largest slaving ports in South America (Rio de Janeiro, Salvador and Recife) transported many more captives from Africa than the total of those from the four major European slaving ports (London, Liverpool, Bristol and Nantes).

David Eltis emphasises the importance of the two systems of wind and ocean currents in the North and South Atlantic Ocean that determined how the transatlantic slave trade was physically carried out. One system lies north of the equator and turns clockwise, while the other lies south of the equator and turns counterclockwise. The northern "wheel" connected Western Europe and West Africa with the Caribbean and North America and was dominated by the English, while the southern "wheel" linked West-Central Africa (mainly Angola) directly to Brazil, an enormous traffic controlled by the Portuguese, who for three hundred years carried on the slave trade with the largest volume. Pieter Emmer says there were two Atlantic systems operative in the first phase of the outward expansion of European commercial activity, including the slave trade, during the early modern period. The first one was created by the Portuguese and the Spanish and the second one by the British, the French, and the Dutch.

== Participants ==
=== European participation ===
Because there were no healthier highlands or inland regions in West Africa where European settlers could have found a sanctuary, they mostly had to confine themselves to the immediate coast where they were exposed to rampant tropical diseases. The high risk of dying because of their lack of immunity to malaria and yellow fever led to the area being known as the "white man's grave". The cost of high mortality rates was far too high to justify establishing a permanent population, while coastal trade required a comparatively limited presence. Europeans typically resided in fortresses on the coasts, where they waited for Africans to provide them captured slaves from the interior in exchange for goods. The historian Ana Lucia Araujo gives the example of the three kingdoms of the Loango coast in West Central Africa, Loango, Kakongo, and Ngoyo, who, recognizing the need to maintain their sovereignty to carry on free trade, kept control over "their territories and never allowed any European power to establish permanent trading posts such as castles, forts, and fortresses in the region during the era of the Atlantic slave trade."

Cases of European merchants kidnapping free Africans into slavery often resulted in retaliation from Africans, who would stop the slave trade and capture or kill Europeans. Europeans who desired uninterrupted trade aimed to prevent kidnapping incidents, and the British passed the "Acts of Parliament for Regulating the Slave Trade" in 1750 which outlawed the abduction of free Africans by "fraud, force, or violence". According to the Lowcountry Digital Library, "When Portuguese, and later their European competitors, found that peaceful commercial relations alone did not generate enough enslaved Africans to fill the growing demands of the trans-Atlantic slave trade, they formed military alliances with certain African groups against their enemies. This encouraged more extensive warfare to produce captives for trading."

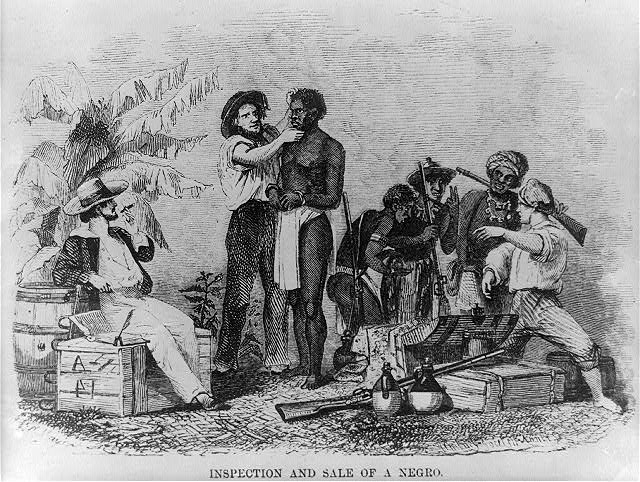
White slave traders inspect an enslaved African man for sale by African slave traders

As Britain rose in naval power and settled continental North America and some islands of the West Indies, the British became the leading slave traders in the North Atlantic. For most of the 18th century Britain shipped more slaves to the Americas than any other European country, including Portugal. At one stage the trade was the monopoly of the Royal African Company, operating out of London, but following the loss of the company's monopoly in 1698, Bristol and Liverpool merchants became increasingly involved in the trade. The historian Kenneth Morgan writes that during the entire period of the British slave trade Liverpool slave ships delivered more than an estimated 1,171,000 slaves to the New World, making it the foremost port of origin of transatlantic slaving voyages before the 19th century. Much of the wealth on which the city of Manchester, and surrounding towns, was built in the late 18th century, and for much of the 19th century, was based on the processing of slave-picked cotton and manufacture of cloth. Other British cities also profited from the slave trade. Birmingham, the largest gun-producing town in Britain at the time, supplied guns to be traded for slaves. London was always the preeminent British port in the sugar trade, and it accounted for about three-quarters of English sugar imports before 1776. Morgan says "cane sugar from the Caribbean was the most valuable British import in the century and a half down to 1820" and that per capita sugar consumption rose in England from 1 lb. to 25 lbs. between 1670 and 1770.

In 1778, Thomas Kitchin estimated that Europeans were bringing an estimated 52,000 slaves to the Caribbean yearly, with the French bringing the most Africans to the French West Indies. The Atlantic slave trade peaked in the last two decades of the 18th century, during and following the Kongo Civil War. Wars among tiny states along the Niger River's Igbo-inhabited region and the accompanying banditry spiked in this period. Another reason for the peak was major warfare conducted by expanding states, such as the kingdom of Dahomey, the Oyo Empire, and the Ashanti Empire.

=== African participation ===
Africans, including rulers, traders and military aristocrats, played a direct role in the slave trade. They sold slaves acquired from wars to increase their personal wealth and thus their power. Per Thornton, there was a very large preexisting slave population in Africa when the first Europeans arrived and during the entire period of the slave trade. Those sold into slavery were usually from a different ethnic group than those who captured them, whether enemies or just neighbours. These captive slaves were considered "other", not part of the people of the ethnic group or "tribe".

The kingdom of Dahomey supplied war captives to European slave traders. The Dahomey King Agaja, who ruled from 1708 to 1732, took control of key trade routes for the Atlantic slave trade by conquering the neighbouring kingdoms of Allada in 1724 and Whydah in 1727. According to Falola and Warnock, control of this coast brought Dahomey into contact with the Dutch, the French, and the English, following which slavery became a state monopoly and the "cornerstone of the Dahomean economy", with extensive plantations maintained by slave labour.

Africans from the Gold Coast (present-day Ghana) participated in the slave trade through intermarriage, or cassare, meaning 'to set up house', derived from the Portuguese 'casar', meaning 'to marry'. Cassare formed political and economic bonds between European and African slave traders. Cassare was a pre-European-contact practice used to integrate the "other" from a differing African tribe. Early on in the Atlantic slave trade, it was common for elite West African families to marry their women to European traders in alliance, bolstering their syndicate. The marriages were even performed using African customs, which Europeans did not object to, given how important the connections were.

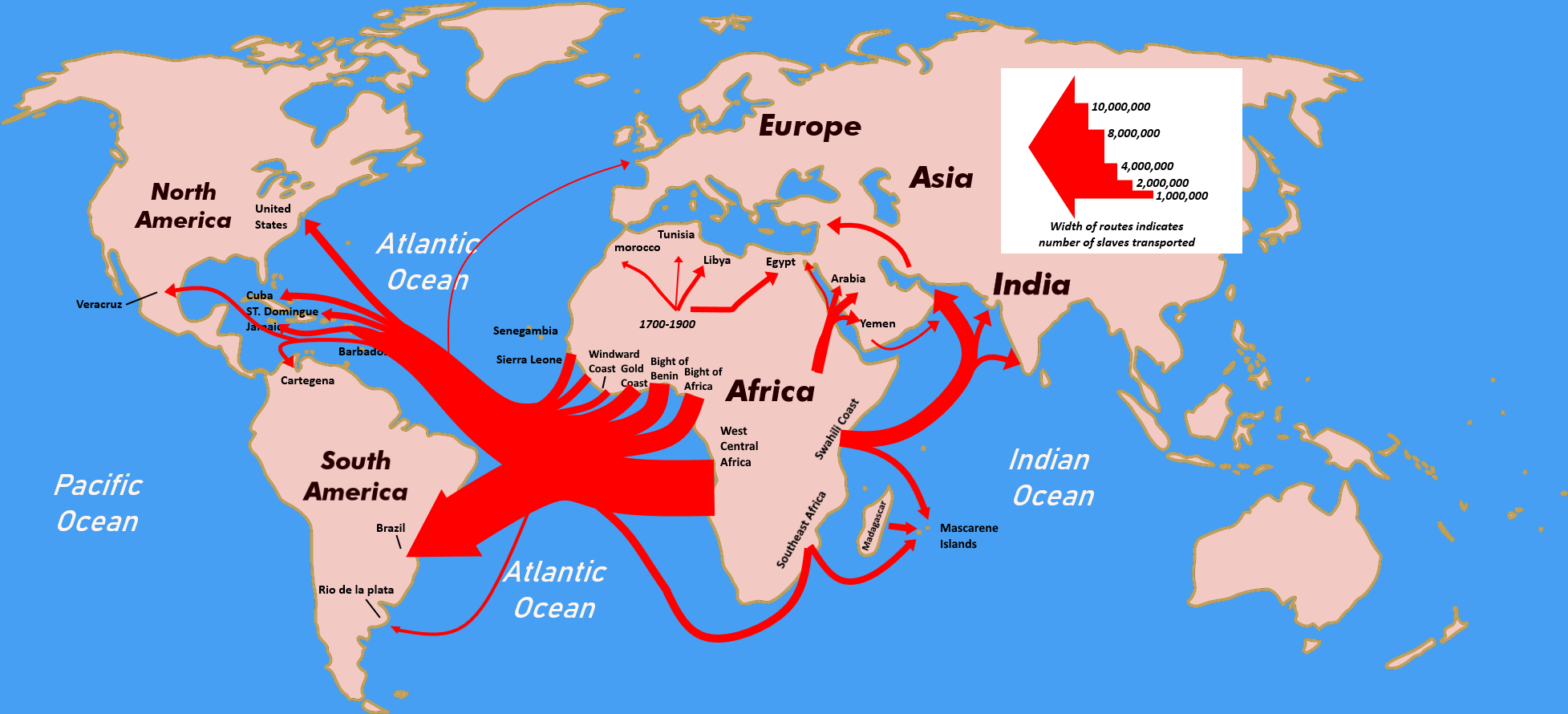
Slave trade out of Africa, 1500–1900

The trade led to the destruction of individuals and cultures. The historian Ana Lucia Araujo says:

The process of enslavement did not end with arrival on the American shores; in this context, the different paths taken by the individuals and groups who were victims of the Atlantic slave trade were influenced by a myriad of factors including the disembarking region, the kind of work performed, gender, age, religion, and language. These elements very often oriented the paths toward freedom available to these men and women.

Patrick Manning estimates that about 12 million slaves entered the Atlantic trade between the 16th and 19th centuries, but about 1.5 million died on board ship. About 10.5 million slaves arrived in the Americas. Besides the slaves who died on the Middle Passage, more Africans likely died during the slave raids and wars in Africa and forced marches to ports. Manning estimates that 4 million died inside Africa after capture, and many more died young. His estimate includes the 12 million who were originally destined for the Atlantic, as well as the 6 million destined for Arabian slave markets and the 8 million destined for African markets. According to Angus Madden, in the 17th century the Dutch, French, and British introduced plantation agriculture to the Caribbean islands seized from Spain. After their indigenous populations had been mostly wiped out, 3.8 million slaves were transported to the Caribbean islands during the colonial period. Between 1500 and 1870, the same number were carried to Brazil.

=== Slave market regions and destinations ===
Major slave trading regions of Africa, 15th–19th centuries

Europeans would buy and ship slaves to the Western Hemisphere from markets across West Africa. The number of enslaved people sold to the New World varied throughout the slave trade. As for the distribution of slaves from regions of activity, certain areas produced far more enslaved people than others. According to Paul E. Lovejoy, "West-central Africa, including the coast from Cabinda and Loango to Angola, accounted for the majority of slaves exported to the Americas until the last quarter of the seventeenth century and a major share of the total thereafter."

Most of the Atlantic slave trade was carried out by seven nations and most of the slaves were carried to their own colonies in the new world. But there was also significant other trading which is shown in the table below. The records are not complete, and some data is uncertain. The last rows show that there were also smaller numbers of slaves carried to Europe and to other parts of Africa, and at least 1.8 million did not survive the journey and were buried at sea with little ceremony.

=== Ethnic groups of the enslaved ===
According to the historian Gwendolyn Midlo Hall, some scholars have proposed and defend the hypothesis that the supposed ethnicities of Africans is a social construct dating from the end of the 19th century. She writes that "European missionaries, anthropologists, and administrators invented African ethnicities in order to create conflicts among the peoples they ruled". Further, she says that historically, distinctive ethnicities were less developed in West Central Africa than in some other West African regions, and that the terms "Angola" and "Kongo" were used widely by Europeans for many diverse peoples. Hall cites Joseph C. Miller as calling for "more contextualised studies by historians who posit ethnic continuities among Africans brought to the Americas."

== Economics of the trade ==
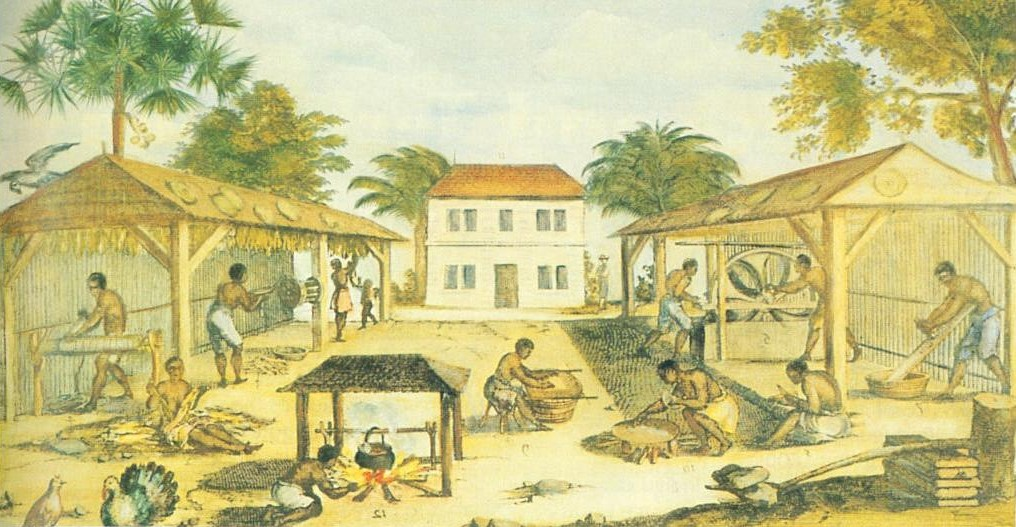
Slaves processing tobacco in 17th-century Virginia

According to the economic historian Barbara L. Solow, the value of British sugar imports by 1660 was greater than that of all other colonial products combined, and by 1774 sugar accounted for 20 per cent of total value of imports, far exceeding any other commodity. In the first half of the 18th century, the British were responsible for a third of the European consumption of sugar, all of it produced by slave labor. Although Britain had entered the sugar colony business late, from around 1720 its colony of Jamaica emerged as the greatest sugar-producing island in the British West Indies.

Frank Moya Pons writes that with sugar as the foundation of the economy in French St Domingue (western Hispaniola, now Haiti), over the course of the 18th century the production of its plantations exceeded that of all the British West Indian colonies put together. By the end of the century, with substantially lower production costs, the French were able to undersell the British in the European sugar market, and after the end of the War of American Independence in 1783, sugar production in the colony reached their highest levels ever. To meet the increasing labour demand, the planters of St Domingue were importing an average of 30,000 African slaves annually before the French Revolution.

Guillaume Daudin says the plantation system established itself as the main support of long-distance trade in 18th-century France. The French trading economy was the biggest in Europe at the end of the 1780s, the total value of its long-distance trade being equal to 25 million pounds sterling, while the total value of British long-distance trade was only 20 million pounds sterling. He finds in his analysis that considering returns, liquidity, maturity, and risk, investments in the slave trade and other long-distance trade were safer and of shorter lifespan than government bonds. Returns for investors in overseas trade voyages averaged around 6 percent; as compared to 5 percent for most domestic alternatives.

The Slavery Abolition Act of 1833 emancipated over 800,000 enslaved persons when it was passed by the British parliament. As part of the compromise made to secure it, the bill also provided compensation for citizens who declared their loss of 'property', setting off what Nicholas Draper says "could be characterised as a feeding frenzy" among slave-owners, those whose families had once owned slaves, and other financial beneficiaries of slavery. The British Government created the Slave Compensation Commission to administer the distribution of £20 million in compensation for over 45,000 individual claims from the former owners of 800,000 persons who had been enslaved.

== Captives' experience ==
=== Capture and African conflicts ===
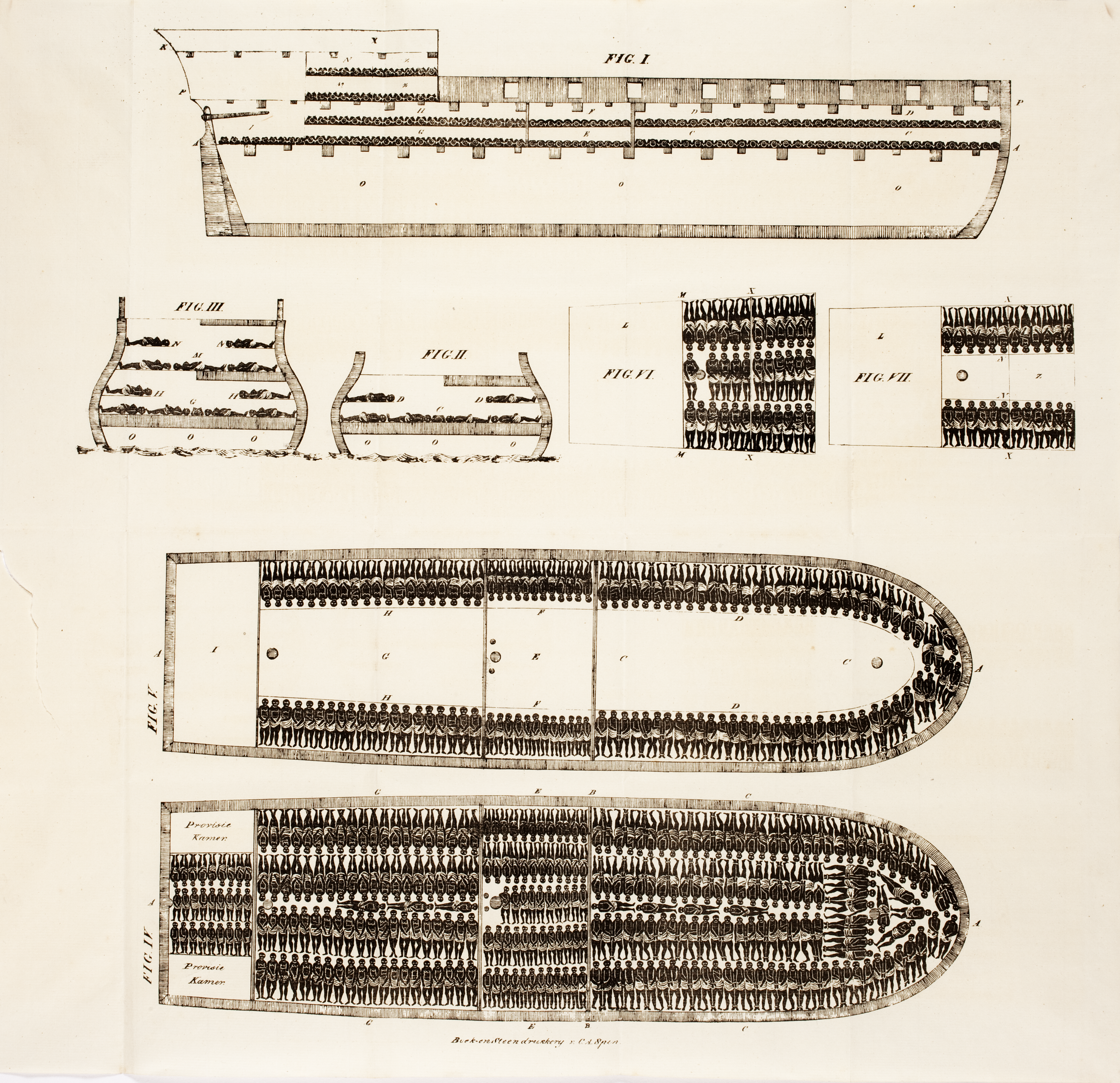
Diagram of a large slave ship. Thomas Clarkson: The cries of Africa to the inhabitants of Europe, c. 1822

J.C. Sharman writes that enormous growth in the demand for slaves gave African rulers more opportunities for state building. Many of them developed "highly militarized predatory slaving states" that first appeared in West Africa as a consequence of the expansion of the transatlantic slave trade in the late 17th century. These rulers used the increased returns from predatory aggression to build armies and states by conscripting slaves as soldiers and trading for guns. The demand for enslaved persons remained high even after the Atlantic slave trade was abolished, with the number of enslaved Africans reaching its highest point near the end of the 19th century. The presence of European slavers affected the way in which the legal code in African societies responded to offenders. Crimes traditionally punishable by some other form of punishment became punishable by enslavement and sale to slave traders.

According to Patrick Manning, warfare was the principal means by which slaves were captured. He cites as an example the constant wars in the Bight of Benin during the late 17th and early 18th centuries, occurring when slave exports from that region were greatest. He refers to John Thornton's work in recovering descriptions of wars between armies of several thousand in 17th-century Angola, with baggage trains made up mostly of women within each army—slave traders would wait nearby to purchase the defeated combatants, a "preselected population" ready to be exported, from the winners. Thornton identifies two aspects of African societies that inclined them to engage in the slave trade: use of slaves in the domestic economy, especially to raise revenue for consolidating a state, and in warfare. He cites Philip Curtin's analysis of the Senegambian slave trade of the 18th century, from which Curtin derived his view that African warfare leading to slave captures was due to either economic or political factors, although wars might be fought for mixed reasons. He infers that the data support the political model.

Michael A. Gomez says that deaths of captives from initial capture to the barracoons on the coast averaged 10 to 15 per cent, reaching as high as 40 per cent in Angola, while Nathan Nunn says that death rates on the forced marches from inland areas to slave ports on the various coasts are estimated to have ranged from 10 per cent to 50 per cent.

Before the arrival of the Portuguese, slavery had already existed in the Kingdom of Kongo. Afonso I of Kongo believed that the slave trade should be subject to Kongo law. When he suspected the Portuguese of receiving illegally enslaved persons to sell, he wrote to King João III in 1526 imploring him to put a stop to the practice.

Dahomey developed as a warrior-state with an economy that became dependent on the transatlantic slave trade. Its kings sold war captives into transatlantic slavery as their main source of revenue, a trade which was entwined with the religious practise of human sacrifice at the Annual Customs, the kingdom's primary public ceremony. King Gezo was quoted in The Anglo-American Magazine as saying in 1849:

The slave-trade has been the ruling principle of my people. It is the source of their glory and wealth. Their songs celebrate their victories, and the mother lulls the child to sleep with notes of triumph over an enemy reduced to slavery. Can I by signing such a treaty, change the sentiments of a whole people? It cannot be!

The Empire of Benin grew increasingly rich during the 16th and 17th centuries on the slave trade with Europe; slaves from enemy states of the African interior were sold and carried to the Americas in Dutch and Portuguese ships. The Bight of Benin's shore soon came to be known as the "Slave Coast". Like the Bambara Empire to the east, the Khasso kingdoms depended heavily on the slave trade for their economy. A family's status was indicated by the number of slaves it owned, leading to wars for the sole purpose of taking more captives. This trade led the Khasso into increasing contact with the European settlements of Africa's west coast, particularly the French. In 1807, the Parliament of the United Kingdom passed the bill that abolished the trading of slaves. According to the historian Kenneth Onwuka Dike, the European abolition movement was puzzling to contemporary Africans, as the English, who had been preeminent in the slave trade, suddenly began opposing it zealously. The trade had been the foundation of the economies of the slave-trading African kingdoms including Dahomey, Bonny, Lagos, and many others that owed their existence and power to the rise of the slave trade. The king of Bonny (now in Nigeria), the predominant slave market in Africa, declared in 1807 (paraphrased):

We [i.e. the king and Council] think that this trade must go on. That also is the verdict of our Oracle and the priests. They say that your country, however great, can never stop a trade ordained by God himself.

=== Atlantic shipment (the Middle Passage) ===
The French slave ship Marie-Séraphique carried an average of 357 enslaved persons during its six voyages to Africa.

After being captured and held in the factories, enslaved persons were shipped on the infamous Middle Passage across the Atlantic Ocean, on which staggering numbers of them died. Their deaths were the result of brutal treatment and poor care from the time of their capture and throughout their voyage, on which they were packed into tight, unsanitary spaces aboard ships for months at a time. Measures were taken to stem the onboard mortality rate, such as enforced "dancing" (as exercise) above deck and the practice of force-feeding enslaved persons who tried to starve themselves. The conditions on board also resulted in the spread of fatal diseases. Other fatalities were suicides, slaves who escaped by jumping overboard.

Radburn and Eltis describe how the famous diagram of the Liverpool slave ship Brooks published in January 1789 by the Society for Effecting the Abolition of the Slave Trade has come to symbolise the horrors of the captive African experience of the Middle Passage. The society disseminated thousands of copies of the image in posters, newspapers, pamphlets, magazines, and books. The scholars say the French ship Marie-Séraphique better represents typical British and French slave ships in the second half of the 18th century than does Brooks. Marie-Séraphique carried an average of 357 enslaved persons during its six voyages to Africa, while British vessels of the period usually carried about 267 captives and French slavers carried about 325. For comparison, the unusually large Brooks carried more than double the average of British vessels.

Raymond L. Cohn, an economics professor whose research has focused on economic history and international migration, has researched the mortality rates among Africans during the voyages of the Atlantic slave trade. He found that mortality rates decreased over the history of the slave trade, primarily because the length of time necessary for the voyage was declining. "In the eighteenth century many slave voyages took at least 2½ months. In the nineteenth century, 2 months appears to have been the maximum length of the voyage, and many voyages were far shorter. Fewer slaves died in the Middle Passage over time mainly because the passage was shorter."

The ordinary sailors on slave ships were badly paid and subject to harsh discipline. Mortality of around 20%, a number similar to and sometimes greater than that of the slaves, was expected in a ship's crew during the course of a voyage; this was due to disease, flogging, overwork, or slave uprisings. Disease (malaria or yellow fever) was the most common cause of death among sailors. A high crew mortality rate on the return voyage was in the captain's interests as it reduced the number of sailors who had to be paid on reaching the home port.

The slave trade was hated by many sailors, and those who joined the crews of slave ships often did so through coercion or because they could find no other employment.

=== Seasoning process ===
Meltzer states that in the 18th century a third of the Africans who survived the Middle Passage died "while being seasoned for labor", a brutal process. Amoebic dysentery was the leading cause of death. Gomez describes the "seasoning" captives underwent after they were transferred from the slavers to their buyers in North America, a period of acculturation in which they had to adapt to a different land with different food, different clothes, and a different climate. They also had to accept the reality of being a slave in a new part of the world and the realization that the degradation they suffered had more to do with their being Africans than with their status as slaves. Upon their disembarkation, they were issued a set of clothes of a coarse material spun from flax or hemp. Then they began the period of seasoning that could last from one to three years. Mullin, among others, argues that newly arrived Africans in Virginia were not seasoned or broken in, but were immediately put to work in the fields to harvest the year's last crops. Gomez says that along the South Carolinia coast, however, a group of new African arrivals were broken in by reliable slaves called "drivers" who taught them the skills they would need to perform their jobs. This instruction was reinforced with light punishments, including the denial of food. Africans imported into Louisiana were treated differently—they were divided into small groups under the instruction of older slaves. A slower approach was used to avoid pushing slaves "too far too fast" and thereby causing them to run away, die from distress and disease, or commit suicide. Slaveholders looking to maximize the return on their investment had to moderate their treatment of the enslaved.

=== African awareness of the conditions of slavery in the Americas ===
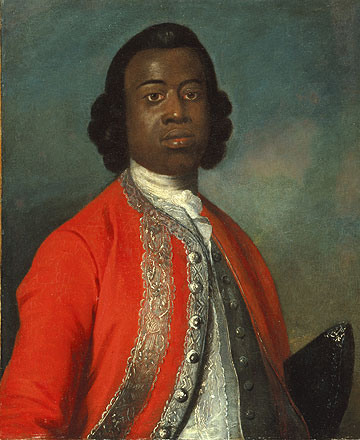
William Ansah Sessarakoo, the son of Eno Baisie Kurentsi (John Currantee) of Anomabu. Both father and son were active slave traders, with John Currantee being the political leader of this major slave exporting town.

It is difficult to reconstruct and generalise how local people in Africa understood the Atlantic slave trade during the period, though according to Robin Law, it seems clear that in Ouidah, and among the ruling elites in Dahomey, there was an "informed understanding" of where slaves were transported to, and what happened to them when they got there. Dahomey sent diplomats to Brazil and Portugal who returned with information about the trips. Royal elites of Dahomey had experienced slavery in the Americas before returning to their homeland. The only apparent moral issue that the kingdom had with slavery was the enslavement of fellow Dahomeyans, an offense punishable by death, rather than with the institution of slavery itself.

On the Gold Coast, it was common for slave-trading African rulers to encourage their children to learn about Europeans by sending them to sail on European ships, live inside European forts, or travell to Europe or America for an education. African diplomats travelled to European cities. Families rescued members tricked into slavery in the Americas by sending demands to the Dutch and British governments, who complied due to fears of reduced trade. An example is the case of William Ansah Sessarakoo, the son of a Fante slave trader on the Gold Coast, who was sold into slavery in Barbados by the British ship's captain who was supposed to take him to England to be educated. His father, a caboceer, or powerful political leader, was able to shut down the British trade until he was emancipated by the Royal African Company. Fenda Lawrence was a slave trader from the Gambia who travelled and traded in Georgia and South Carolina as a free person before returning home.

A common assumption by Africans who were unaware of the purpose of the Atlantic slave trade was that they had been sold to cannibals who planned on cooking and eating their captives. This belief was a source of significant distress for enslaved Africans; Thornton says it was a way of expressing their feeling that they considered themselves "the victims of a plot involving greedy and selfish people."

== Slavery in the Americas ==
=== Labour and plantation slavery ===
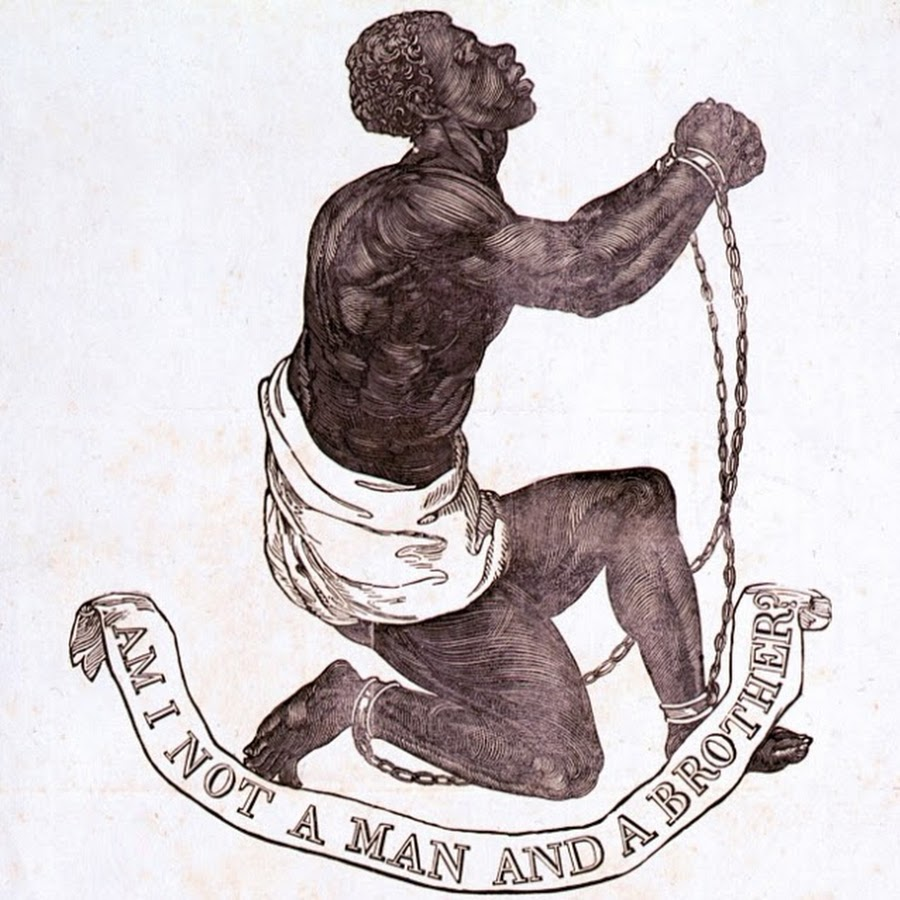
A Wedgwood anti-slavery medallion, produced in 1787 by Josiah Wedgwood

The Atlantic slave trade was the result, in part, of a labour shortage created by the desire of colonists to exploit New World land and resources for profit. Native peoples were exploited as slave labour by Europeans until a large number died from overwork, Old World diseases, and maltreatment, conditions which also led to low fertility among them. In the mid-16th century, the Spanish New Laws prohibited enslavement of the Indigenous people, causing a labour shortage. Alternative sources of labour, such as indentured servitude, failed to provide a sufficient workforce. Many crops could not be sold for profit, or even grown, in Europe. Exporting crops and goods from the New World to Europe often proved to be more profitable than producing them in Europe. A vast amount of labour was needed to create and sustain plantations that required intensive labour to grow, harvest, and process prized tropical crops. When the enslavement of Indigenous peoples failed to meet their labour demands, the Portuguese and Spanish shifted to the importation of African slaves, followed later by the English and the French. This transition began around the mid-16th century in Iberia, and included Brazil as well; it occurred approximately between 1650 and 1750 in the Dutch, British, and French colonies. West Africa (part of which became known as "the Slave Coast"), Angola and nearby Kingdoms and later Central Africa, became the primary source of enslaved people to meet the increased demand.

Thomas Jefferson attributed the use of slave labour in part to the climate, and the consequent idle leisure afforded by slave labour: "For in a warm climate, no man will labour for himself who can make another labour for him. This is so true, that of the proprietors of slaves a very small proportion indeed are ever seen to labour." The economist Elena Esposito argues that the enslavement of Africans in America was attributable to the fact that the American south was sufficiently warm and humid for malaria to thrive; the disease had debilitating effects on the European settlers. Conversely, many enslaved Africans were taken from regions of Africa which hosted potent strains of the disease, so they had developed resistance. This resulted in higher malaria survival rates in the American south among enslaved Africans than European labourers, making them a more profitable source of labour and encouraging their use.

David Eltis argues that Africans were enslaved by Europeans because of cultural beliefs that prohibited the enslavement of group insiders, even if there was another source of labour available to be enslaved, such as convicts, prisoners of war or vagrants. He argues that traditional beliefs existed in Europe against enslaving Christians, while those subject to enslavement were non-Christians or natives of Africa and their immediate descendants (a slave converting to Christianity did not guarantee emancipation). Eltis also says that while all slave societies have demarked insiders and outsiders, Europeans took this process further by extending the status of insider to the entire European continent, rendering it unthinkable to enslave a European since this would require enslaving an insider. Africans were viewed as outsiders and thus qualified for enslavement. According to the historian Anita Rupprecht, British insurance underwriters were never able to settle the question of whether slaves were commodities or human beings, but Africans always refused to be treated as goods. They "struggled, rebelled, mounted insurrections, mutinied, took over ships and embraced [...] piracy." Cases like the Zong massacre, in which the captain of the slave ship Zong ordered 133 Africans thrown overboard, occurred without justice for the victims. Granville Sharp's narrative of the incident was widely publicised, providing effective propaganda for the British abolitionist cause.

=== Caribbean ===
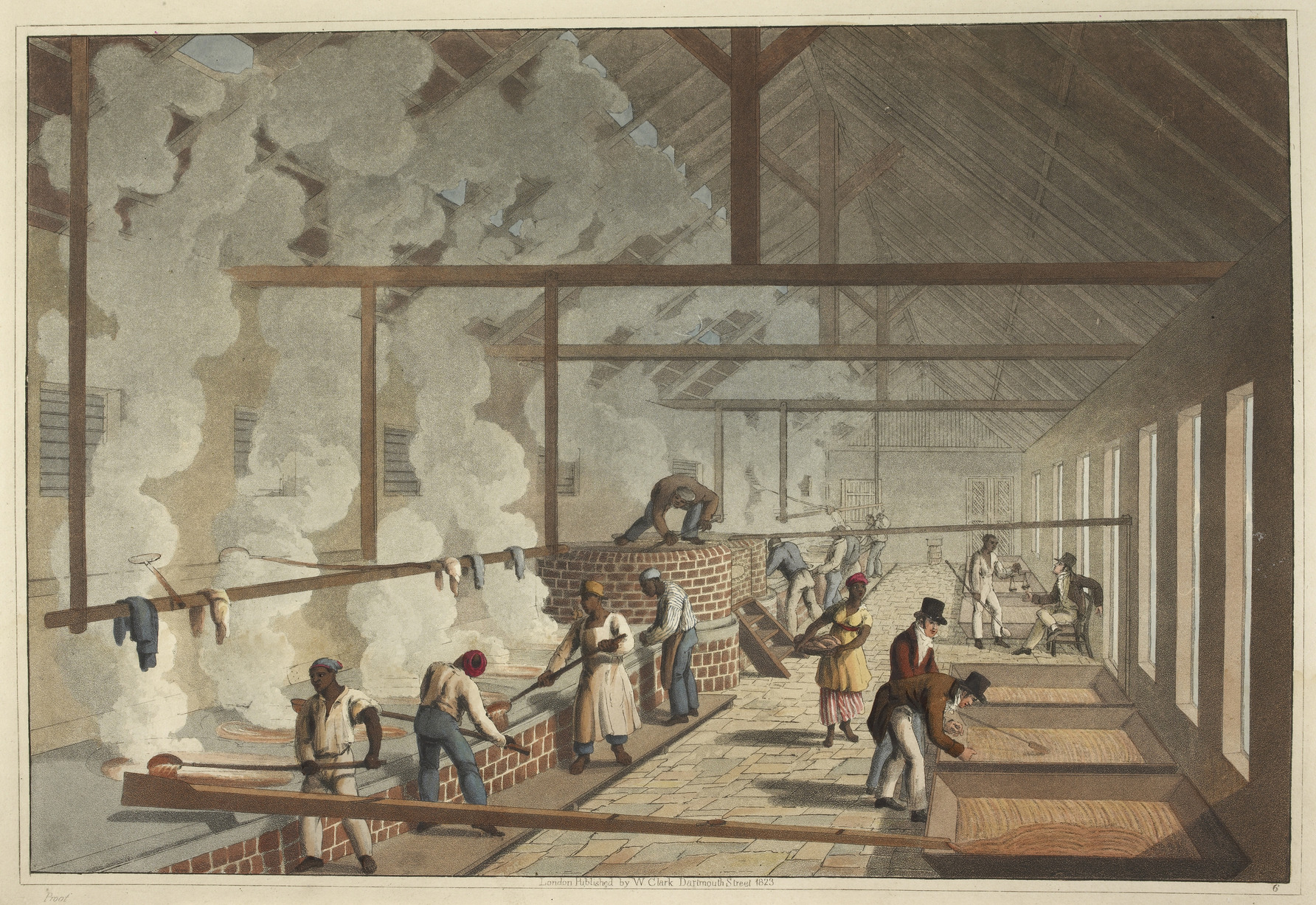
Enslaved people inside a sugar boiling house on the island of Antigua in 1823

The historian Carolyn E. Fick cites the estimate of Hilliard d'Auberteuil, a French lawyer who lived and practiced in Saint Domingue for several decades in the 18th century, that between 1680 and 1776, more than 800,000 enslaved people were brought from Africa to Saint Domingue. By the end of that interval, at the time he was writing, there were only 290,000 Africans living in the colony, over one-third of those transported having died within the first few years. The historical researcher Gabriel Debien found that generally half of newly enslaved Africans died during the first three to eight years of their servitude.

Klas Rönnbäck writes that during the period of the early modern Atlantic world, sugar production, mostly for European markets, grew to depend on the forced labor of slaves of African descent. The growing demand for sugar and the natural decrease of the slave population (a result of the routine of hard labor and an inadequate diet) were the main drivers for the expansion of the transatlantic slave trade. Michael Tadman says that among the enslaved population in the antebellum US there was a natural increase of about 25 percent per decade. In stark contrast to this statistic, Brazilian and Caribbean slaves commonly suffered rates of natural decrease of 20 percent per decade. By 1800 and even afterwards, Africans, rather than Creoles (those born in-country), composed a majority of the slave populations of Brazil and of the British and French Caribbean. According to Tadman, sugarcane planters would always demand a predominantly male workforce and would always seek to import slaves when a supply was available because of the high rates of natural decrease in sugar-producing areas. During slavery, it was the free mixed-race and free black populations, along with the Maroons, that experienced relatively high fertility rates, while low levels of fertility were typical of the enslaved populations.

Kenneth F. Kiple argues that the slave populations of the West Indies suffered natural decrease because of the combined effects of genetic, immunological, cultural, and above all, nutritional factors. Common wisdom among West Indian planters and physicians blamed "locked jaw" (neonatal tetanus), caused by improper care of the umbilical cord, as the primary cause of infant death among the enslaved. Infantile beriberi, caused by thiamine deficiency, may have been a decisive factor itself in suppressing the natural growth of the Caribbean slave population. Neonatal tetany, caused by deficiencies of calcium, magnesium, and vitamin D, with symptoms involving muscle seizures, caused many infantile deaths, while kwashiorkor, a severe form of protein malnutrition, caused the deaths of many children after weaning. Deaths are frequently attributed to diarrhea or worms in areas where kwashiorkor is prevalent, and these two causes of death appear to have caused most of the deaths among enslaved children who had survived infancy.

=== South America ===
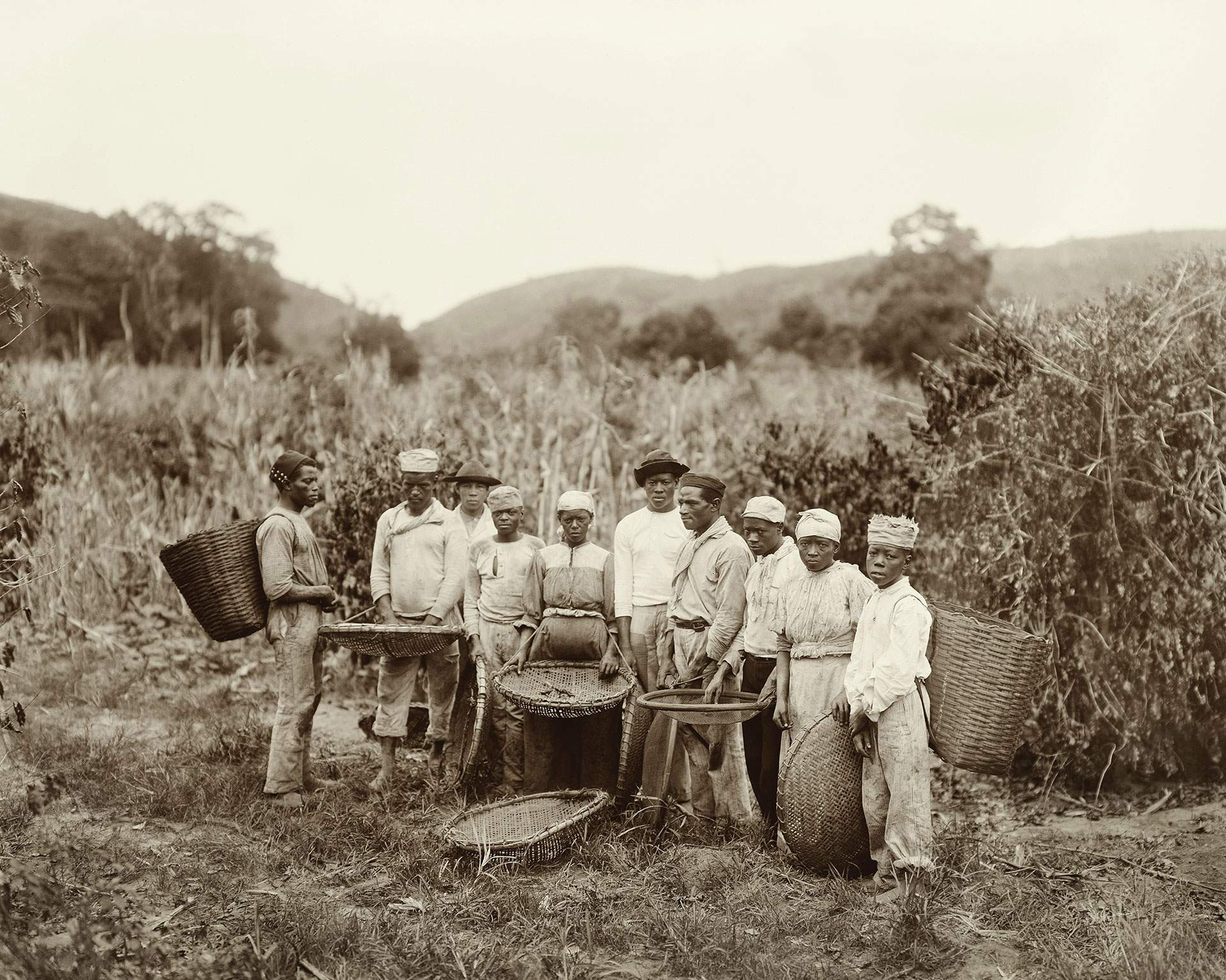
Enslaved people working on a coffee plantation in Brazil (c. 1885)

The historian Martha Santos writes that as the transatlantic slave trade was legally suppressed in Brazil in 1831, and fully abolished in 1850, it became more difficult to replenish the supply of slaves, and the inter-provincial trade increased greatly. The planter class, wanting to maximize profits from their existing stock of slaves, considered enslaved women's reproductive capacity and their mothering labor as central to replacing the African captives who had formerly been imported in the trade. Brazil enforced the principle of partus sequitur ventrem, the doctrine that children of enslaved mothers inherit the legal status of their mothers, as legal justification for the perpetuation of slavery. Slavery itself was finally abolished in Brazil in 1888.

=== United States ===
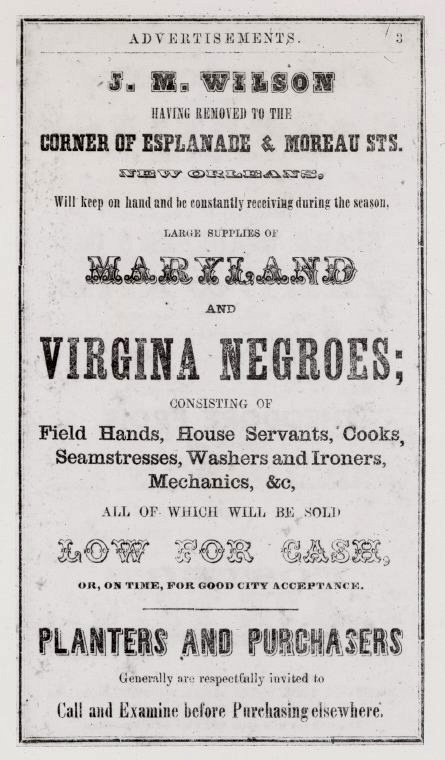
Advertisement from J. M. Wilson for sale of Maryland and Virginia slaves. Maryland and Virginia sold thousands of enslaved people to the Deep South.

Birth rates were low for the first generation of slaves transported from Africa, but, in the US, may have increased in the 19th century to some 55 per thousand, approaching the biological maximum for human populations.

According to Aisha Djelid, planters hired out enslaved men to other plantations so they could impregnate enslaved women; the enslavers regarded these interactions as business transactions. The value of enslaved women decreased as their fertility decreased, so their enslavers encouraged them to reproduce at a very young age. The imperative of reproducing forced on enslaved young girls and women caused them to have reproductive health problems. Enslaved women found ways to resist forced reproduction by causing miscarriages and abortions by using plants and medicines.

Slaveholders tried to control enslaved women's reproduction by encouraging them to have relationships with enslaved men. "Some slaveholders took matters into their own hands, however, and paired enslaved men and women together with the intent that they would procreate." Enslaved girls and women were forced to give birth to as many slaves as possible. The mortality rate of enslaved mothers and children was high because of poor nutrition and sanitation, lack of medical knowledge, and overwork. The historian Anthony Gene Carey refers to a list compiled for Confederate tax purposes by the Cunningham family in Georgia as an example of the typical pattern on plantations: women beginning to bear children in their late teens or early twenties and giving birth every two or three years into their early forties. The demands of the regime of heavy labor on plantations along with poor nutrition and/or disease could also lead to lower birth rates. The economist Michael Haines writes that around 1850, African Americans in the United States, who were mostly slaves at the time, "had an estimated life expectancy at birth of 23 years (40 percent lower than for whites) and an estimated infant mortality rate of about 340 (61 percent higher than for whites)."

According to Antonia Sohns, between 1790 and 1800, nearly 1 million enslaved people in the United States were "sold down the river", meaning they were moved forcibly from the Upper South to the Lower South. They were torn from their families into a brutal life of hard labor and injustice. The Act Prohibiting Importation of Slaves, promoted and signed by Thomas Jefferson and enacted on 1 January 1808, prohibited the importation of slaves into the United States. The decline of the Atlantic slave trade to the United States caused an increase in the domestic slave trade.

==== Clandestine slave trade after 1808 ====
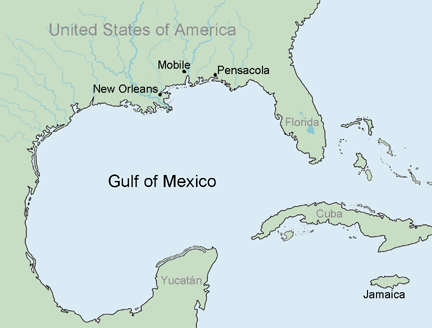
The Gulf of Mexico was used by privateers in Florida, Louisiana, and Texas to smuggle enslaved Africans from Cuba.

Regarding claims there was a sizable clandestine traffic in enslaved Africans between the island of Cuba and Florida after 1808, Kiple says statistical evidence and historical inquiries discourage belief in a large contraband slave trade to the United States during this period, therefore the existence of a substantial Cuba to Florida slave traffic is unlikely. He cites Philip D. Curtin's estimate that the total number of slaves brought to the United States during the years 1808-1861 was not more than 54,000. Fernandina, located in Spanish Florida on Amelia Island, just south of the border with the US, became a free port in 1808. Slave traders then preferred to carry on their business at its deep-water port rather than at St Augustine and the town became a resort for smugglers. The Spanish authorities in La Florida welcomed the increased industry and tax revenues brought by the slave trade, and encouraged slave traders to set up operations there. According to Frances Stafford, a long and mostly uninhabited coastline and its proximity to Cuba made Florida an ideal location, and as early as 1810 it was a centre of slave trading. Florida remained under Spanish control until 1821 when it was ceded to the United States.

By a treaty Spain signed with Britain in 1817, the Atlantic slave trade exportation of slaves to Cuba became illegal in 1820; however, the Cuban authorities were uninterested in abolishing slavery, and slave ships continued to bring enslaved Africans from Africa. The last slave ship known to reach the island made its voyage in 1867, but the institution of slavery itself was not abolished until 1886.

Jorge Felipe, a researcher and contributor to the SlaveVoyages project, analysed intra-American and transatlantic voyages to Cuba between 1790 and 1820. His data shows intra-American and transatlantic slave arrivals to Cuba increased significantly in this period, followed by a higher peak of direct transatlantic arrivals from 1820 to 1860. The historian Jennie K. Williams writes that the coastwise trade in the United States was conducted via the Atlantic Ocean and/or the Gulf of Mexico. The greatest part of this trade involved enslaved people being carried forcibly to New Orleans, the largest slave market in the country at the time. Relying only on extant records, she finds that between 1818 and 1860 more than 63,000 enslaved people were trafficked to New Orleans in coastwise ships.

The costs of the shipment of human cargo from Africa and operating costs of the slave trade from Africa into Cuba rose in the mid-19th century. The historian Laird Bergad writes of the Cuban slave trade and slave prices: "Three interacting factors produced the overwhelming demand for slaves responsible for pushing prices to the high levels [...] The first was the uncertainty surrounding the future of the slave trade itself. The long and persistent British campaign to force an end to the Cuban trade had traditionally been circumvented by collusion between Spanish colonial officials and Cuban slave traders. An additional obstacle to British efforts was the unwillingness of the United States to permit the search of US-flag vessels suspected of involvement in the slave trade". As the cost of sugar increased after 1855, the prices of prime-aged slaves, those 15 to 40 years old, moved upward. According to Bergad's 1987 study, in 1860 about 39.6 percent of slaves sold in Matanzas were young prime aged Africans of either sex; in 1870 the percentage was 74.3 percent.

Texas was part of Mexico from 1821 until 1836, and its coast on the Gulf of Mexico provided an ideal location for pirates and privateers to base their operations. Cuba was a key distribution centre for the African slave trade into Latin America, and because it was relatively close to Galveston Island at a distance of 800 miles, it became the main source of enslaved Africans for Anglo-American settlers in Texas. Galveston was also only about 60 or 70 miles away from the Louisiana border on a very shallow coastline; consequently smugglers utilised its location to their advantage and illegally transported enslaved Africans from Cuba, selling them to slaveholders in Texas and Louisiana. The French pirate and privateer Jean Lafitte established a colony on Galveston Island in 1817 and cruised as a privateer for four years, making a profit by smuggling in African slaves and selling them to slaveholders in the United States. Lafitte used intermediaries such as the Bowie brothers, John, Resin, and James, who contracted with planters from the United States looking to buy slaves. John Bowie bragged that between 1818 and 1820 the brothers had made $65,000 smuggling Africans into the US and selling them to planters in Mississippi and Louisiana.

Sean M. Kelley says the total number of African or other foreign-born captive persons disembarked in the United States after 1820 was very small. As Mexican Texas began to develop its own plantation economy in the 1830s, smugglers bought about one thousand enslaved Africans in Cuba and moved them to the lower Brazos River, where they became "the largest African-born community in the antebellum United States". The historian Ernest Obadele-Starks, referring to calculations made by Curtin, deduces that after 1808 the number of enslaved Africans smuggled into the United States annually averaged as low as 3,500.

The last slave ship known to have landed on US soil was the schooner Clotilda, which in 1860 illegally smuggled 110 Africans into Mobile Bay. The Africans on board were sold as slaves; however, slavery in the US was abolished five years later following the end of the American Civil War in 1865. Cudjoe Lewis, who died in 1935, was long believed to be the last survivor of Clotilda and the last surviving slave brought from Africa to the United States, but the historian Hannah Durkin has found that two other survivors from Clotilda outlived him: Redoshi, who died in 1937, and Matilda McCrear, who died in 1940.

== Creole languages and cultures ==
The historian Pierre Force says that according to Ira Berlin's concept of Atlantic Creoles, they originated when Africans first encountered Europeans on the western coast of Africa in the 15th century. Berlin uses the term to refer to those who "became part of a new culture that emerged along the Atlantic littoral—in Africa, Europe, or the Americas—beginning in the 16th century." Many Atlantic creoles of the 17th century found themselves enslaved, and those transported to the North American coast were able to establish themselves in the new environment, where their knowledge and their "ability to negotiate with the diverse populace" were valued. This allowed them to establish their place in the developing social order. Some Atlantic Creoles achieved freedom, married, sometimes intermarrying with whites, and became property owners, interpreters, farmers, and even slaveholders themselves. The historian Ira Berlin gives the example of Anthony Johnson, who was sold to the English in 1621 at Jamestown and who, by his own efforts, gained freedom for himself and his family. He and his sons became independent farmers, held slaves, and left their heirs considerable estates.

Berlin demonstrates how Atlantic Creoles emerged in the 15th century around the transatlantic trading factories established by Europeans along the coast of Africa. Many of them functioned as liaisons in these trading enclaves, where they used their linguistic skills and their knowledge of the Atlantic coast's cultural conventions, commercial practices, and diplomatic protocol to work as middlemen between the African merchants and European shipmasters. Some Atlantic Creoles represented the interests of those parties who belonged to the race they identified with, and acted as their agents in negotiations while others assumed the racial identity of whoever paid best. They were often multilingual and worked as "merchants, slave traders, linguists, sailors, artisans, musicians, and military figures." They traded with Europeans along the African coast and established Creole communities in Africa and the Americas. With the European settlement of lands in the New World, the main destination of the Atlantic slave trade shifted from Europe to the Americas, where slavery weighed heavily on Atlantic Creoles.

To overcome language difficulties between Africans and Europeans, nonverbal communication such as signs and gestures was sometimes resorted to, but their use was limited and they were easily misunderstood. A more effective means of communicating was by using African interpreters, both enslaved and free, to facilitate exploration and trade between the groups. A trade language emerged along the African coast during the Atlantic slave trade period with a mix of West African and European languages called English Creole. Multiple African pidgin English languages developed along the West and Central African coast.

Abdul Karim Bangura describes the pidgin used by slave owners and slave traders as a lingua franca that covers a range of regional hybrids. Bangura refers to Tom McArthur's noting that "some researchers have proposed a family of 'Atlantic creoles' that includes Pidgin in West Africa, Gullah in the United States, and the various patois of the Caribbean." Gullah is the Creole language of the African population of the Sea Islands in South Carolina, Georgia, and Florida. Gerardo Lorenzino writes that "Angolar is the language spoken by descendants of maroon slaves who escaped from Portuguese plantations on São Tomé beginning in the mid-sixteenth century". These slaves contributed to the formation of Angolar Creole Portuguese. Some revolts on slave ships were deterred by European traders who purposely chose Africans who spoke different languages. This contributed to the further evolution of African Pidgin English. Makeshift pidgin languages evolved when enslaved Africans in the New World needed to communicate with the slavers and among themselves, with each side using the grammar of their native language. The enslaved borrowed vocabulary from the language of the slave masters to express content in their speech.

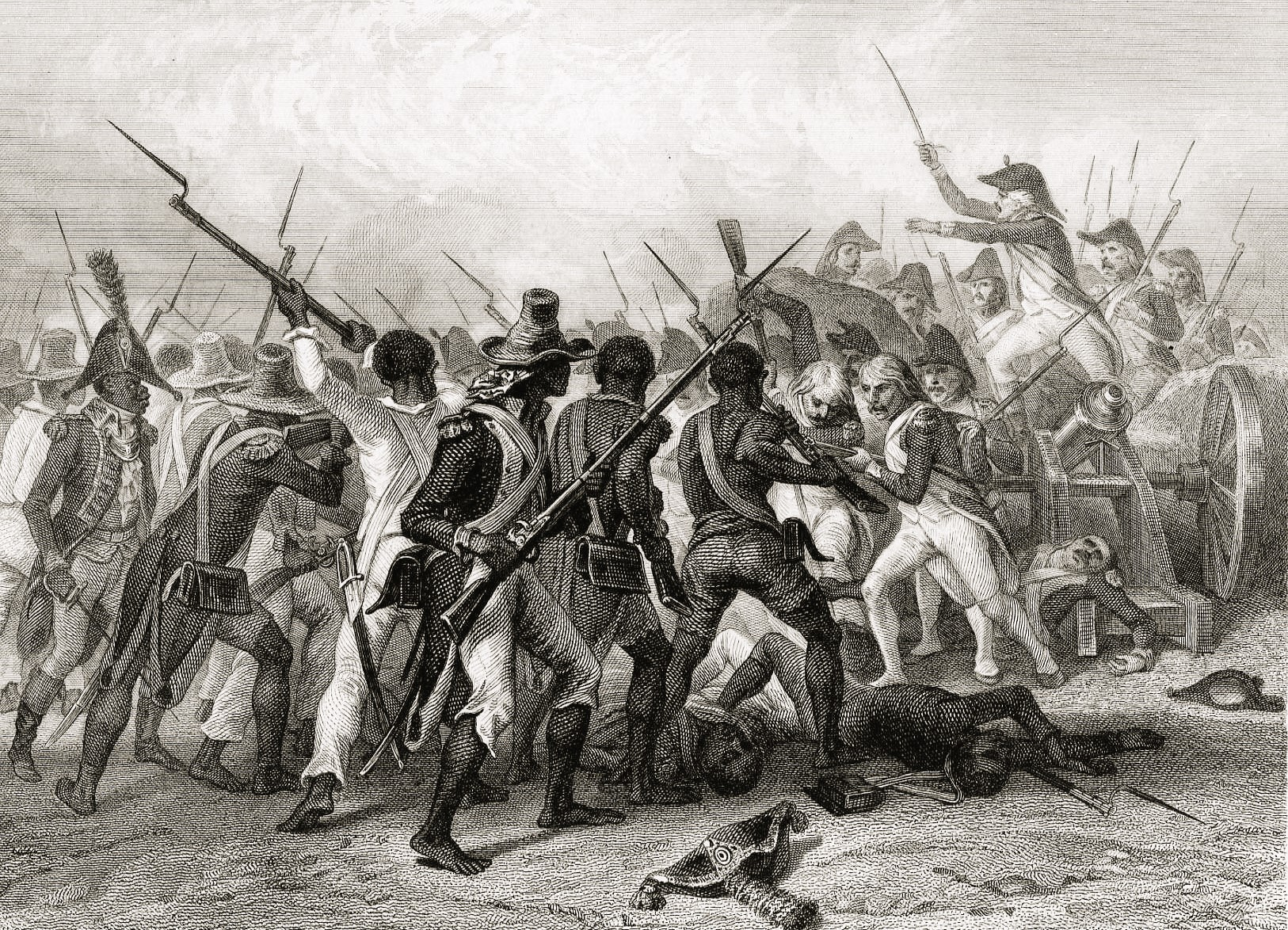
Battle between insurgent slaves and Napoleonic troops during the Haitian Revolution (1791–1804)

According to the historian Jane Landers, historians who study Atlantic Creoles argue that despite their subordinate status, Atlantic Creoles who lived "on the African coasts, in Europe, or in the Americas" engaged in various economic, political, social, cultural, and religious systems, without an implication that they lost some part of their original cultural foundations. They interacted with a wide range of Indigenous and European groups and "helped shape a new Atlantic world system". The historian Philip Morgan says "blacks were the most linguistically polyglot and proficient ethnic group in the Americas." Salikoko Sangol Mufwene has advanced a thesis regarding the genesis of Creole languages considered in the light of ecological linguistics. He posits that as populations on plantations increased more by the importation of new labour both from Africa and Europe than by births, the rapid increase affected the emerging structures of labourers' vernacular speech. Because the African slaves had little contact outside their working hours with Europeans, even with those indentured servants who laboured with them, newly arrived Africans learned the colonial vernacular of their enslavers mostly from the Creole and 'seasoned' slaves.

Blassingame says slaves influenced the formation of language in the southern United States by forcing whites who tried to communicate with them to learn African words, and by combining "African forms, Biblical lore, and archaic Anglicanisms", introduced new idiomatic expressions to their speech. Glassman describes how Creole language developed simultaneously and independently in Haiti and Louisiana along similar lines. Creole (Kreyòl) allowed the enslaved to communicate in a coded language by which they were able to organize the Haitian Revolution undetected by the French.

== Resistance and abolition ==
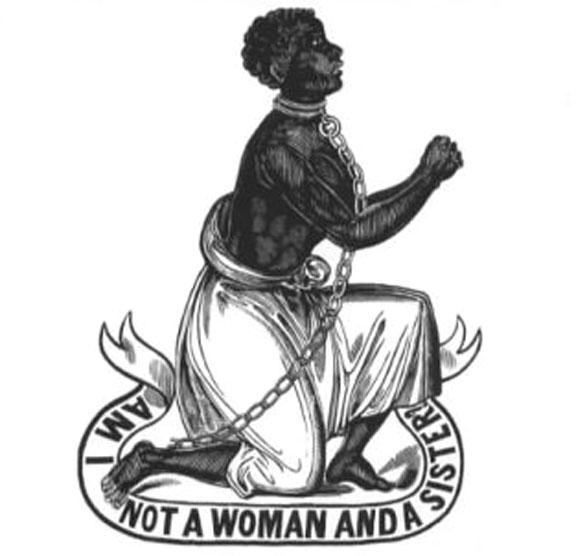
"Am I not a woman and a sister?" antislavery medallion from the late 18th century

Abolitionists of African, European, and American descent campaigned against the Atlantic slave trade. Black abolitionists generally took a more radical approach to abolition than their white counterparts, encouraging strikes, slave rebellions aboard slave ships and on plantations, circulating petitions, telling personal narratives about the horrors of slavery, and advocating for freedom and equal rights for Black people in the African diaspora. In the United States, Black activists preceded white abolitionists in using what was then the radical strategy of making the struggle against slavery a moral crusade.

=== African opposition to the slave trade ===
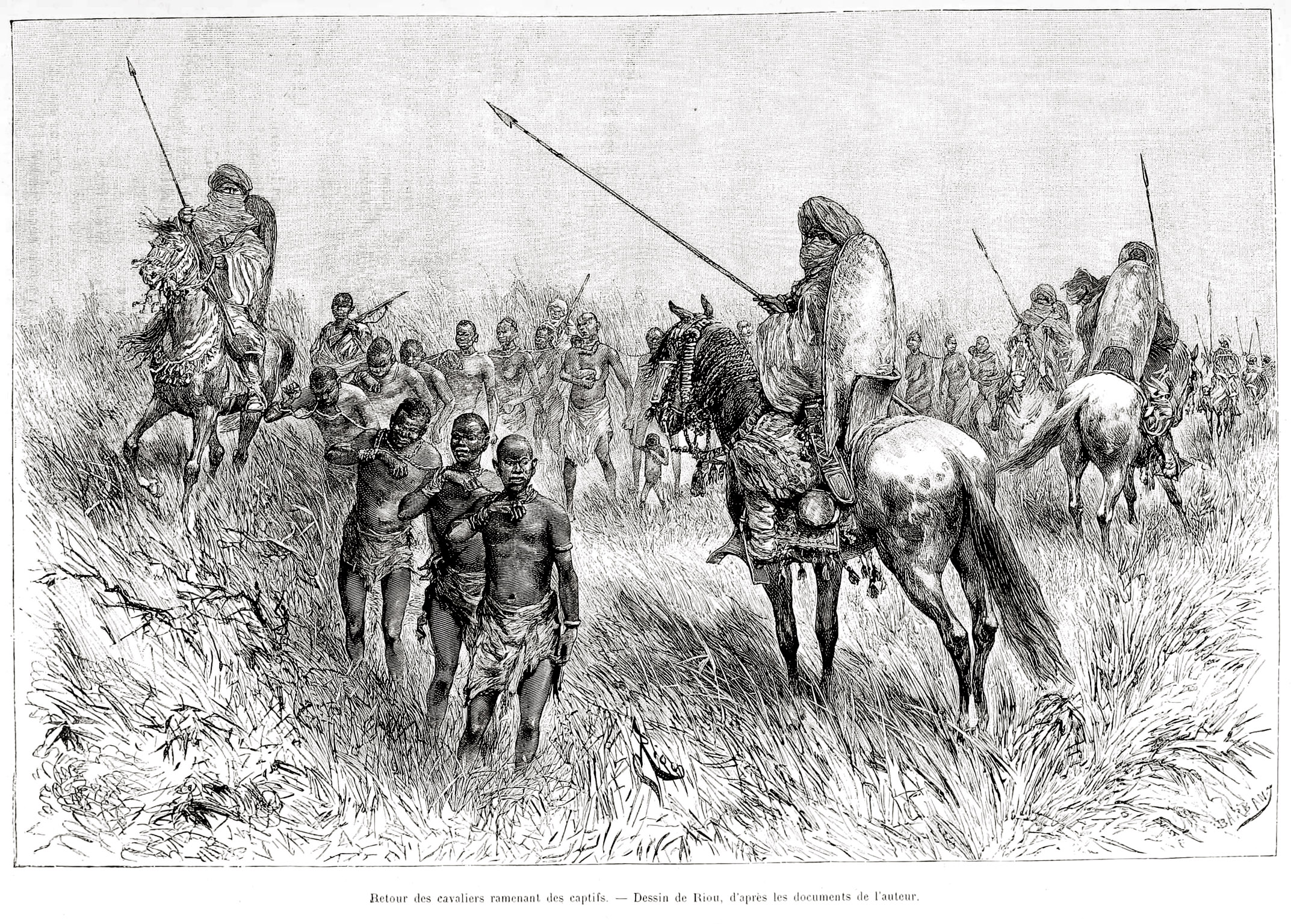
Boukary Koutou's Mossi cavalry returning with captives from a raid, Ouagadougou

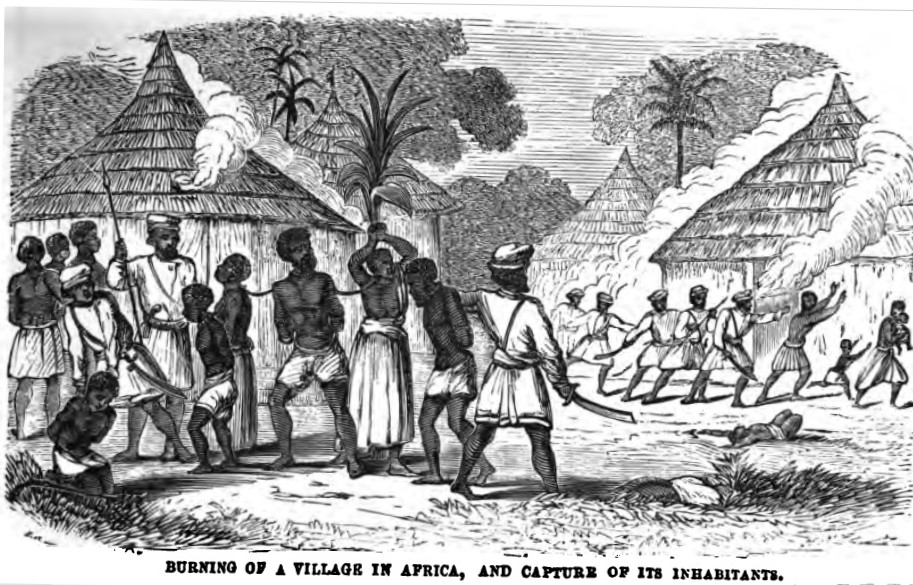
Burning of a village in Africa, and capture of its inhabitants. To escape slave raids some Africans fled into swamp regions or to other areas.

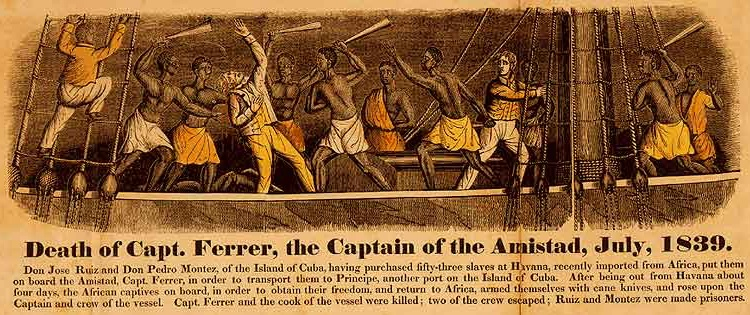
On July 1, 1839, enslaved Mende people aboard the Amistad revolted and took control of the ship. This incident led to a Supreme Court case in 1841.

While African merchants maintained control over the slave trade in Africa, some African rulers organised military resistance movements and fought African slave raiders and European slave traders entering their villages. African resistance occurred in every phase of the slave trade—Africans resisted forced marches to the slave holding stations, they resisted at the coast, and they were prone to revolt on the slave ships. In 1729 the enslaved Africans aboard the slave ship Clare seized its firearms and gunpowder, drove the crew from the vessel, and landed the ship near Cape Coast Castle in present-day Ghana. Enslaved Africans sank ships, killed their crews, and set fire to other ships with explosives. Investors in slaving voyages saw to it that precautions were taken to prevent shipboard rebellions by such means as separating the men from women and children in the hold of the ship. Men were frequently shackled while the ships were anchored near the African coast, and all the captives were watched round the clock by armed crewmen.

Shipping records indicate that from 1698 to 1807 there were 350 acts of insurrection aboard slave ships. According to Richardson, perhaps as many as one of every ten transatlantic slaving voyages experienced an insurrection; most of them were defeated. Ship owners invested in cannon, swivel guns, firearms, and extra crew to prevent escapes or revolts. To thwart suicides, crewmen placed nets around slave ships to catch enslaved persons who jumped overboard. An instrument called the "speculum oris" was used to force feed those who tried to starve themselves. There was a common stereotype that the Igbo people were unusually prone to commit suicide. Snyder says although planters in South Carolina and slave traders in the West Indies avoided the Igbo because of reports that they were prone to suicide, 38 percent of all slaves imported to Virginia between 1710 and 1760 were Igbo.

John Newton was the captain of an English slave ship who later became an ordained minister and an abolitionist. He recorded in his ship's log several attempted insurrections on his own ship, and observes that some were successful in seizing other ships. In 1730 the slave ship Little George departed from the Guinea Coast and sailed for Rhode Island with a cargo of 96 enslaved Africans. A few slaves slipped out of their shackles, killed three watchmen on deck, and imprisoned the captain and crew. The revolting slaves took control of the ship and sailed it back to the Sierra Leone River in Africa. After failing to frighten them with a bottle bomb and threats of sinking the ship, the captain and his crew made a deal with the Africans for the opposing sides to liberate each other. When the ship reached the shoreline, the Africans fled. According to research by Jane Landers, more rebellions occurred when there were large numbers of African women aboard.

== Abolitionist movements ==
=== African abolitionists ===
According to the sociologist José Lingna Nafafé, the first movement against slavery and the Atlantic slave trade started in the 17th century among Africans in the Portuguese empire. Lourenço da Silva de Mendouça, a royal from Angola's Ndongo Kingdom, campaigned against the slave trade while travelling and living in Brazil, Portugal, and Spain. In 1684 Mendonça presented his criminal court case in the Vatican, demanding liberation for Africans, New Christians (Jews converted to Christianity) and American Indians.

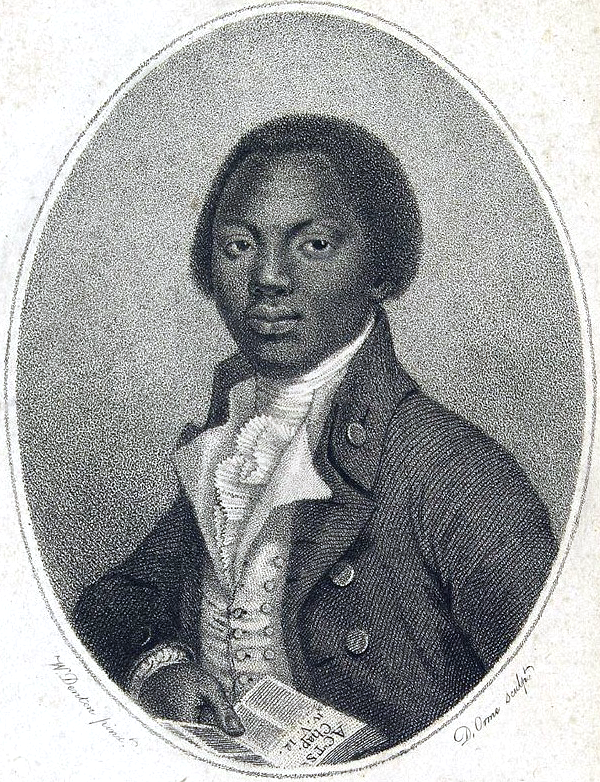
Olaudah Equiano was a member of the 'Sons of Africa', an abolitionist group of African men that campaigned against slavery and the slave trade.

Slavery's supporters cited Africans enslaving each other and claimed this as evidence of Africans' inferior nature. A common narrative of the abolition of the Atlantic slave trade portrays European Christians as morally superior and saviors of Africans from enslavement. In addition, Christian narratives also justified the slave trade, and the colonialism that followed British abolition.

The historian Benedetta Rossi writes that "several African rulers passed anti-slave trade and anti-slavery laws and edicts before colonial occupation." She says the oversimplified contrast drawn between "non-abolitionist Africa" and "abolitionist Europe" is misleading and without necessary nuance. European abolition laws passed with consequences for African societies were not far removed from these earlier independent African abolitions. Rossi states, "Organized pan-African and pan-Atlantic resistance to the Atlantic slave trade system is documented in studies on multiple locations from West Central Africa and the Coast of Guinea." She says Muslim and Christian reformists condemned what they saw as misdirected enslavement and the excessive brutality imposed on slaves. She notes also that well before the 18th century, among those persons notable for the force of their arguments against slavery were Africans who protested the injustices of the Atlantic slave trade. Many victims of slavery and those who supported them demanded court hearings to present their legal arguments against what they considered unjust enslavement, and defended themselves or others at trial. Anton Wilhelm Amo, from a region of what is now Ghana, in 1729 wrote his thesis, titled "De jure Maurorum in Europa" (About the Rights of Moors in Europe), for the University of Halle. He disputed the legality of the transatlantic trade in enslaved Africans, arguing that this trade was illegal according to Roman laws that had granted certain rights to the kings of Africa.

In addition, African resistance to enslavement on slave ships and various rebellions in the Americas sparked debates about abolishing the slave trade and slavery. The abolitionist Olaudah Equiano was a former slave who wrote an autobiography published in 1789 that discussed the horrors of slavery, and gave lectures in Britain advocating abolition of the Atlantic slave trade and chattel slavery. According to Vincent Carretta, Equiano described himself as "a native of Africa" in a letter he wrote to the bishop of London, and in 1786 the Morning Herald reported that he was "from Guinea". Carretta, however, cites the evidence in baptismal and naval records indicating that Equiano was born in South Carolina rather than Africa. Nonetheless, in 1788 Equiano attended the House of Commons debates about slavery and abolition of the slave trade, wrote letters to the government, and corresponded with parliamentarians.

=== American and European abolitionists ===
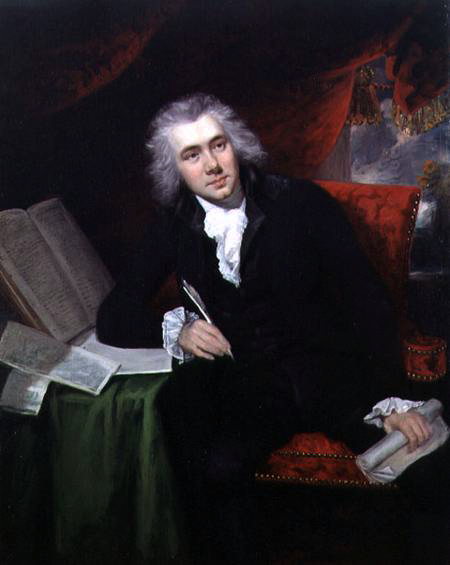
William Wilberforce (1759–1833), politician and philanthropist who was a leader of the movement to abolish the slave trade

In Britain, America, and in parts of Europe, opposition developed against the slave trade. David Brion Davis says British and American abolitionists assumed "that an end to slave imports would lead automatically to the amelioration and gradual abolition of slavery". Opposition to the trade was led by members of the Religious Society of Friends (Quakers), Thomas Clarkson, and establishment Evangelicals such as William Wilberforce in Parliament. Many people joined the movement and began to protest against the trade, but they were opposed by absentee planters, merchants, and their parliamentary allies in Britain. Following Lord Mansfield's decision in 1772, many abolitionists and slave-holders believed that slaves became free upon entering the British isles. However, in reality occasional instances of slavery continued in Britain right up to abolition in the 1830s. The Mansfield ruling on Somerset v Stewart decreed only that a slave could not be transported out of England against his will.

With the passage of a bill most likely composed by Thomas Jefferson, the new U.S. state of Virginia in 1778 became the first state and one of the first governments in the modern world to prohibit the commercial slave trade; it made the importation of slaves by sea or land a crime, with several exceptions. The new law freed all slaves brought in illegally after its passage and imposed heavy fines on violators. All the other states in the United States followed suit, although South Carolina reopened its slave trade in 1803.

Denmark, which had been active in the slave trade, was the first country to ban the trade through legislation in 1792, which took effect in 1803. Britain banned the slave trade in 1807, imposing stiff fines for any slave found aboard a British ship (see Slave Trade Act 1807). The Royal Navy moved to stop other nations from continuing the slave trade and declared that slaving was equal to piracy and was punishable by death. The United States Congress passed the Slave Trade Act of 1794, which prohibited the outfitting of US ships for a slaving voyage "to any foreign country" or the transporting of slaves in foreign places. The U.S. Constitution (Article I, section 9) barred a federal prohibition on importing slaves for 20 years; at that time the Act Prohibiting Importation of Slaves prohibited imports on the first day the Constitution permitted, January 1, 1808.

=== British abolitionism ===
Quakers began to campaign against the British Empire's slave trade in the 1780s, and from 1789 William Wilberforce was a driving force in the British Parliament in the fight against the trade. The abolitionists argued that the trade was not necessary for the economic success of sugar in the British West Indian colonies. This argument was accepted by wavering politicians, who did not want to destroy the valuable and important sugar colonies of the British Caribbean. Parliament was also concerned about the success of the Haitian Revolution, and they believed they had to abolish the trade to prevent a similar conflagration from occurring in a British Caribbean colony.

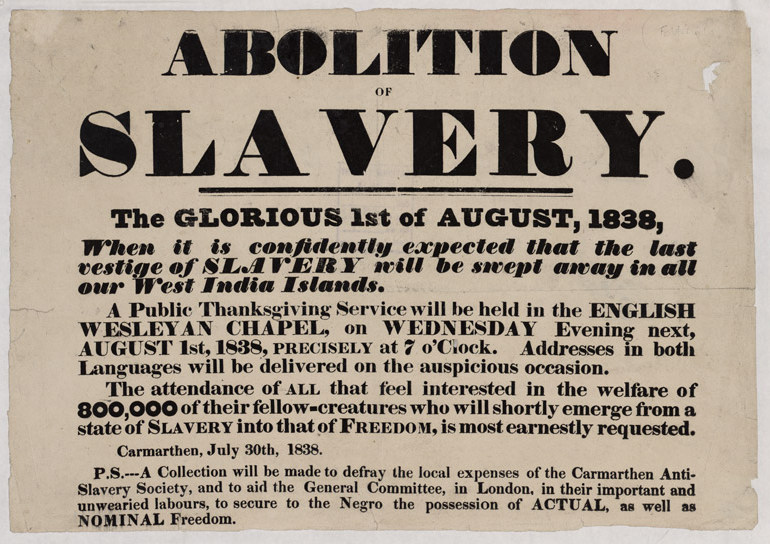
Abolition of Slavery The Glorious 1st of August 1838

On 22 February 1807, the House of Commons passed a motion by 283 votes to 16 to abolish the Atlantic slave trade. Hence, the slave trade in British ships was abolished, but not the still economically viable institution of slavery itself, which provided Britain's most lucrative import at the time, sugar. Williams argues that abolitionists did not move against sugar and slavery itself until after the sugar industry went into terminal decline after 1823. According to Eltis, Lewis, and Richardson, 19th-century abolitionists argued that a permanent decline in the British slave economy had taken place in the late 18th century, even though "the volume and value of sugar produced in the Caribbean increased through to the beginning of the nineteenth century and continued unabated down to the end of slavery itself."

The United States passed its own Act Prohibiting Importation of Slaves the next week (March 2, 1807), although probably without mutual consultation. The act only took effect on the first day of 1808; since a compromise clause in the US Constitution (Article 1, Section 9, Clause 1) prohibited federal, although not state, restrictions on the slave trade before 1808. The United States did not, however, abolish its internal slave trade, which became the dominant mode of US slave trading until the 1860s. In 1805 the British Order-in-Council had restricted the importation of slaves into colonies that had been captured from France and the Netherlands. Britain continued to press other nations to end its trade; in 1810 an Anglo-Portuguese treaty was signed whereby Portugal agreed to restrict its trade into its colonies; an 1813 Anglo-Swedish treaty whereby Sweden outlawed its slave trade; the Treaty of Paris 1814 where France agreed with Britain that the trade is "repugnant to the principles of natural justice" and agreed to abolish the slave trade in five years; the 1814 Anglo-Dutch treaty where the Dutch outlawed its slave trade.

Abolitionist opinion in Britain was strong enough in 1807 to abolish the slave trade in all British possessions, although slavery itself persisted in the colonies until 1833. Abolitionists after 1807 focused on international agreements to abolish the slave trade. Foreign Minister Castlereagh switched his position and became a strong supporter of the movement. Britain arranged treaties with Portugal, Sweden and Denmark in the period between 1810 and 1814, whereby they agreed to end or restrict their trading. These were preliminary to the Congress of Vienna negotiations that Castlereagh dominated and which resulted in a general declaration condemning the slave trade.

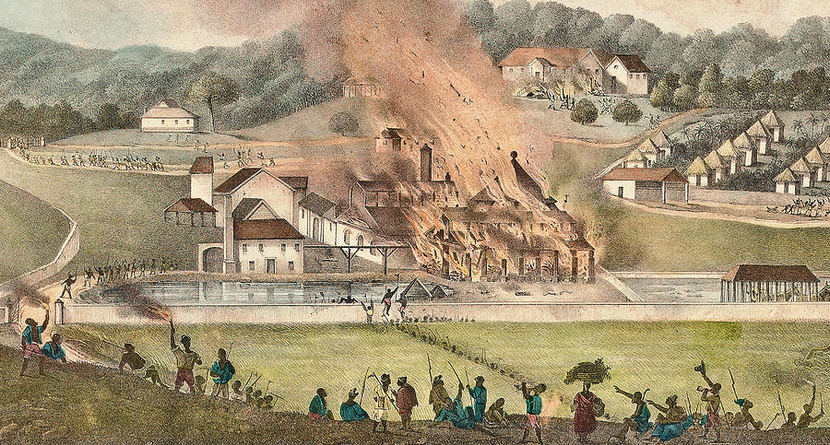
Landscape by Adolphe Duperly showing the destruction of the Roehampton plantation during the Baptist War, January 1832

As described by the historian Manisha Sinha, resistance by the enslaved gave rise to debate over emancipation in the United States, and hastened abolition in Great Britain. In 1830 British abolitionists began a petition drive for the immediate abolition of slavery, and later that year free "colored" people in Jamaica gained equal rights with whites. This was followed by a surge of abolitionist activism by free Blacks and a slave resistance movement in the West Indies.

In December 1831 an enslaved Jamaican, Samuel Sharpe, a deacon in the Baptist Church, led a widespread slave rebellion on the island. The so-called Baptist War of 1831–1832, also known as the Christmas Rebellion, was joined by nearly sixty thousand slaves, and became the largest slave revolt in the history of the British colonies. Slaveholders blamed the abolitionists and Baptist missionaries for the revolt. Fourteen white people were killed, in consequence of which the colonial authorities imprisoned Baptist missionaries and killed over five hundred slaves. After Sharpe was executed in 1832, the British Parliament appointed a select committee to assess the practicality of ending slavery throughout the British Dominions. Abolitionist petitions and the Reform Act secured the passage of the Slavery Abolition Act in 1833.

=== British Royal Navy enforcement ===
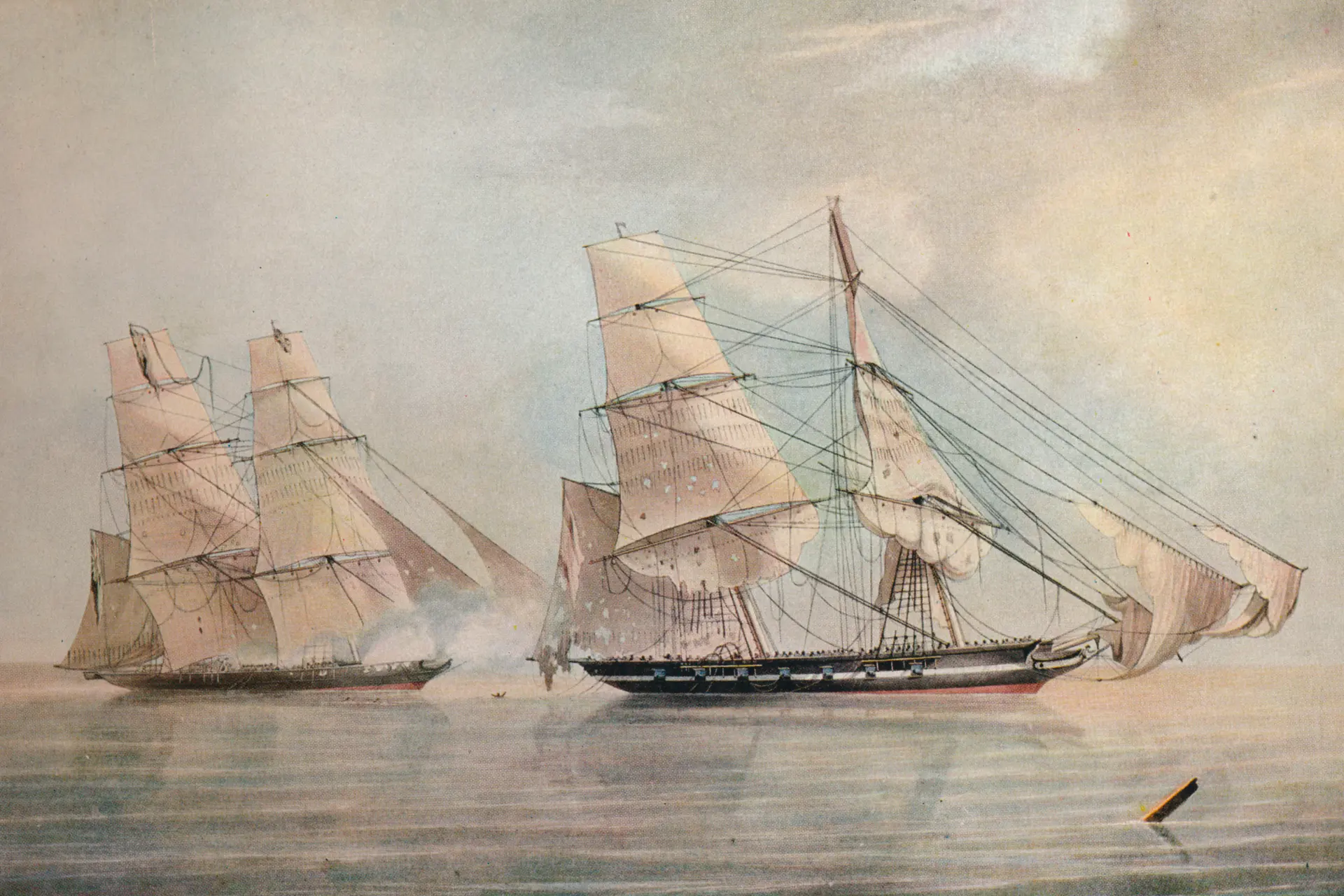
HMS Black Joke (left) firing on the Spanish slave ship El Almirante on 1 February 1829

The Royal Navy's West Africa Squadron, established in 1808, grew by 1848 to a force of some 25 vessels, which were tasked with combating slavery along the African coast. According to Richard Anderson et al (2013), "the transatlantic slave trade carried off an estimated 12.5 million captives from Africa, and distributed most of the 10.7 million who survived the voyage over regions in the Americas that stretched from the temperate north (New England) to the temperate south (Rio de la Plata)." Although the traffic lasted almost four hundred years, over one quarter of those transported, or 3.2 million enslaved persons, embarked after British abolition in 1807, in the period when the slave trade was illegal and suppressed. Approximately 2.8 million survived the voyage, of whom 175,000 had been liberated by mostly British naval vessels operating under orders to intercept slave ships before they reached their destinations.

According to Domingues da Silva, Eltis, et al, between 1800 and 1867, Great Britain detained 1,596 slave vessels involved in the Atlantic slave trade. The naval historian Christopher Lloyd says the introduction of the screw steamship with heavier armament and lighter fuel consumption, more than any other innovation by the Royal Navy, eventually killed the slave trade in Africa.

=== Brazil ends the Atlantic slave trade ===
Ana Lucia Araujo says the transatlantic slave trade to Brazil was legally outlawed in 1831, although it was not actually abolished until the Eusébio de Queirós Law was passed in 1850, when the slave trade on the West African coast had already been halted. To evade the ban, slave traders often misrepresented the location of their transactions. In the period between 1831 and 1850 the Brazilian slave trade continued and expanded, while the conditions of slave transportation got worse and the death rate increased. Araujo cites the Trans-Atlantic Slave Trade Database for the information that "between 1831 and 1850, a total of 564,488 enslaved Africans left African slave ports for Brazil, while 502,307 slaves effectively disembarked on Brazilian shores", a number "higher than the total volume of enslaved Africans disembarked in the United States for the entire period of the North American Atlantic slave trade."

The historian Dale T. Graden proposed that the Malê Revolt in 1835 played a key role in the abolition of the transatlantic slave trade to Brazil. On January 25, 1835, an estimated 600 free and enslaved Africans armed with guns ran through the streets of Salvador shouting "death to the whites" and "death to the soldiers." They fought a force of about fifteen hundred soldiers, police, and civilians, and were defeated, suffering heavy casualties. Abolitionists argued that if the slave trade and slavery continued, slave resistance movements would increase, resulting in more deaths. Seventy three per cent of the Africans arrested in the aftermath of the revolt were Yoruba men, many of whom were Muslims, while other Yoruba slaves and freedpersons converted to that faith.

== Effects ==
The Marxist historian Walter Rodney argued that "after eliminating the indigenous inhabitants and exploiting the labor of millions of Africans" in North America, the British crown used its colonies to accumulate primary capital for re-export to Europe. The northern colonies themselves benefitted directly from the slave trade in the British and French West Indies and in the American South, while profits derived from slavery and the slave trade went first to the commercial ports and industrial areas on the northeastern seaboard of New England and New York. Based on earlier theories developed by Eric Williams, Rodney connects the beginning of the industrial revolution to the expansion of the slave trade in England, particularly as manifested in the growth of the port of Liverpool. He cites other examples of the connections between capitalism and slavery, such as the invention of the steam engine by James Watt, which was financed by plantation owners from the West Indies.

In his own analysis of the impact of the Atlantic slave trade on precolonial African societies, Patrick Manning critiqued Rodney's and Basil Davidson's contention that the trade had a significantly corrosive effect. He deduces that "neither was able to develop a sustained and detailed analysis". Joseph C. Miller has argued that the social change and demographic stagnation (which he researched on the example of West Central Africa) was caused primarily by domestic factors, while Joseph Inikori developed a new line of argument, comparing the actual population of Africa to estimates of what the population might have been if there were no slave exports.

=== Effects on West Africa ===
Archibald Dalzel, an English factor on the coast of West Africa in the latter quarter of the 18th century and a proponent of the slave trade, attributed its cruelty to the "inherent nature of African society" and argued that the purchase of slaves saved captives from being executed. Andreas Eckert says the Western world began to focus its attention on slavery in Africa in the latter half of the 19th century as geopolitical and economic motives drove European powers to invade, conquer, and colonise the continent in the so-called "Scramble for Africa" that lasted until the early 20th century. The abolitionist missionary David Livingstone depicted the slave trade as an "insurmountable barrier to all moral and commercial progress" that was devastating the social order necessary to carry on trade.

The historian Nathan Nunn conducted research using data from shipping records and historical documents and found a negative relationship between the number of slaves exported from a country during Africa's slave trade and its current (as of 2008) economic performance. He concludes that the evidence suggests the slave trades had an adverse effect on the economic development of African states, and that the poorest African countries in the 21st century are the ones from which the most slaves were taken.

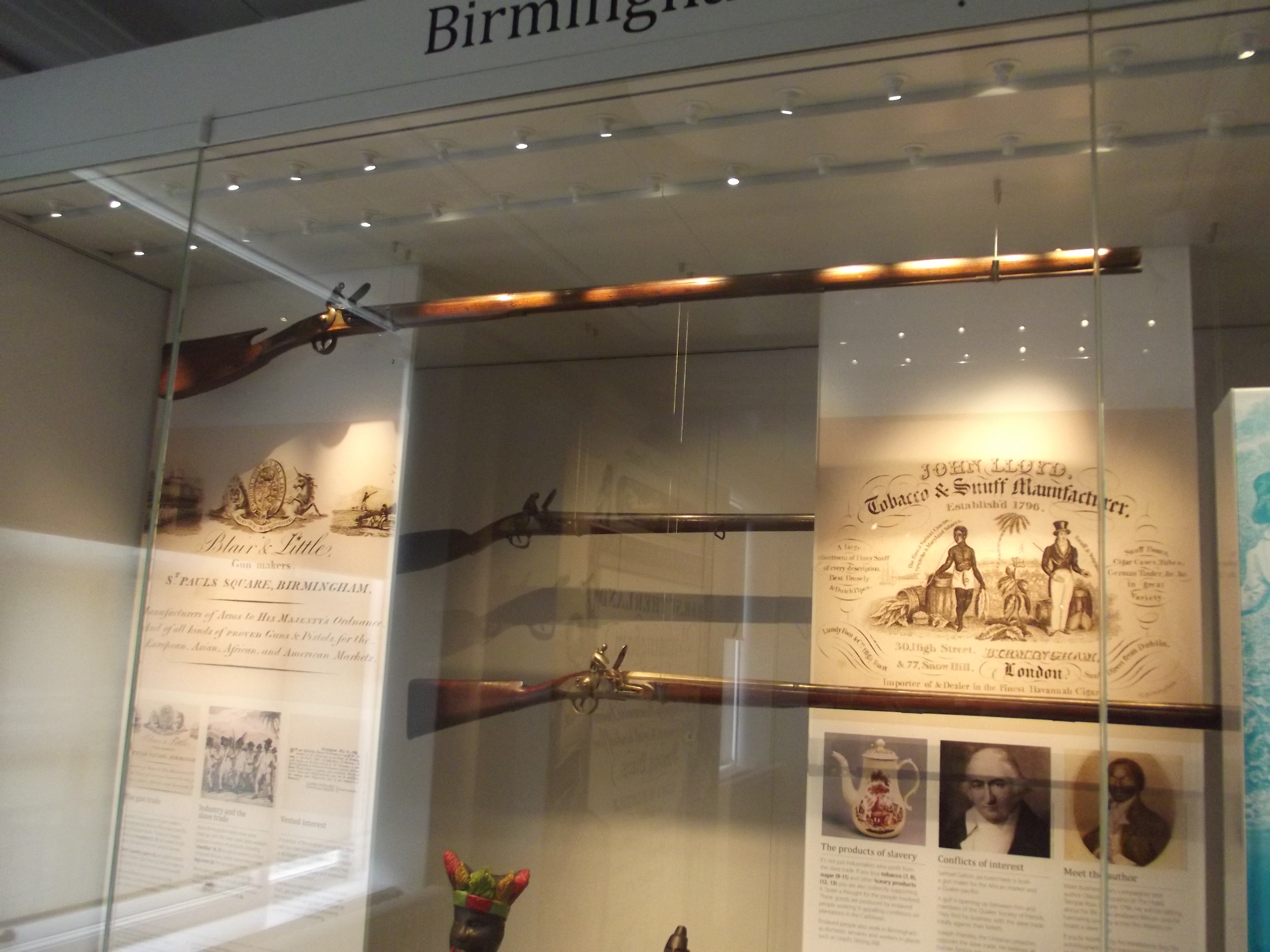
Slaving guns (Birmingham History Galleries). In the second half of the 18th century, Europeans sold 300,000 rifles a year in Africa, maintaining the endemic state of war in which men who were taken prisoner were sold to supply the demand for slaves.

The Africanist historian John Thornton argues that, with the exception of the Portuguese-controlled coast of Angola, "African rulers generally controlled access to their coasts, and were able to prevent direct enslavement of their subjects and citizens by Europeans." The business of supplying enslaved people to European shippers along the African coast was controlled by African merchants and political elites. Fage says there appears to be a close relationship in West Africa between political and economic development and the growth of the slave trade. This commerce was already underway before the 15th century, when the European sea trade with West Africa began, and before the European demand for slaves had become preeminent, which did not occur until the second half of the 17th century.

Per Fage, slavery and the commodification of enslaved people were not natural features of West African society, but they became the means by which elites in West African society endeavoured to exploit the inherent wealth of the land and its people, a process which was well established before Europeans arrived. The Atlantic trade brought new crops to Africa and more efficient currencies which were adopted by the West African merchants. This can be interpreted as an institutional reform which reduced the cost of doing business, but the developmental benefits were limited as long as the business included slaving. Although Fage notes that for West Africans "... there were really few effective means of mobilizing labour for the economic and political needs of the state" without the slave trade, Thornton asserts that African states could and did choose not to participate in the slave trade, as did many sparsely documented groups in Atlantic Africa.

=== Effects on Britain and Europe ===
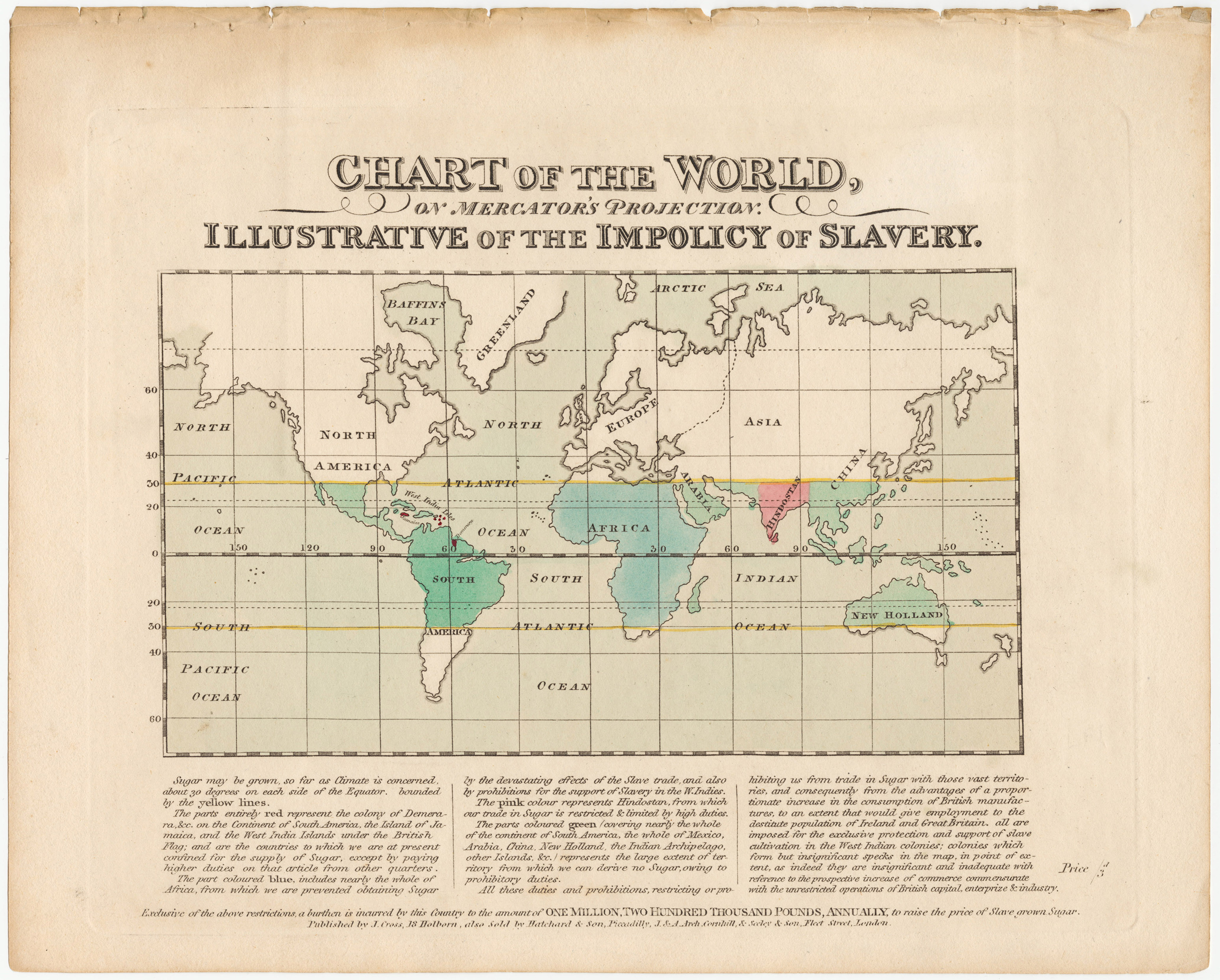
This map argues that import prohibitions and high duties on sugar were artificially inflating prices and inhibiting manufacturing in England. 1823

The historian Eric Williams in 1994 argued that the profits Britain received from the triangular slave trade and direct trade with the colonies contributed substantially to the financing of Britain's industrial revolution. However, he says that by the time of British abolition of slavery in 1833, the sugar plantations of the British West Indies had lost their profitability, and it was in Britain's economic interest to emancipate the slaves. Other researchers and historians have strongly contested what has come to be referred to as the "Williams thesis" in academia. David Richardson has concluded that the profits from the slave trade amounted to less than 1% of domestic investment in Britain. The economic historian Stanley Engerman cites Richard Sheridan's calculations that even without subtracting the associated costs of defence nor allowing for the effect of the tariff preferences on the cost of sugar in England, the total profits from the slave trade and of the West Indian plantations amounted to less than 5% of the British economy for a year about 1770, early in the Industrial Revolution.

Karl Marx, in his influential economic history of capitalism, Das Kapital, wrote that "... the turning of Africa into a warren for the commercial hunting of black-skins, signalised the rosy dawn of the era of capitalist production." He argued that the slave trade was part of what he termed the "primitive accumulation" of capital, the 'non-capitalist' accumulation of wealth that preceded and created the financial conditions for Britain's industrialisation.

=== Demographic effects ===
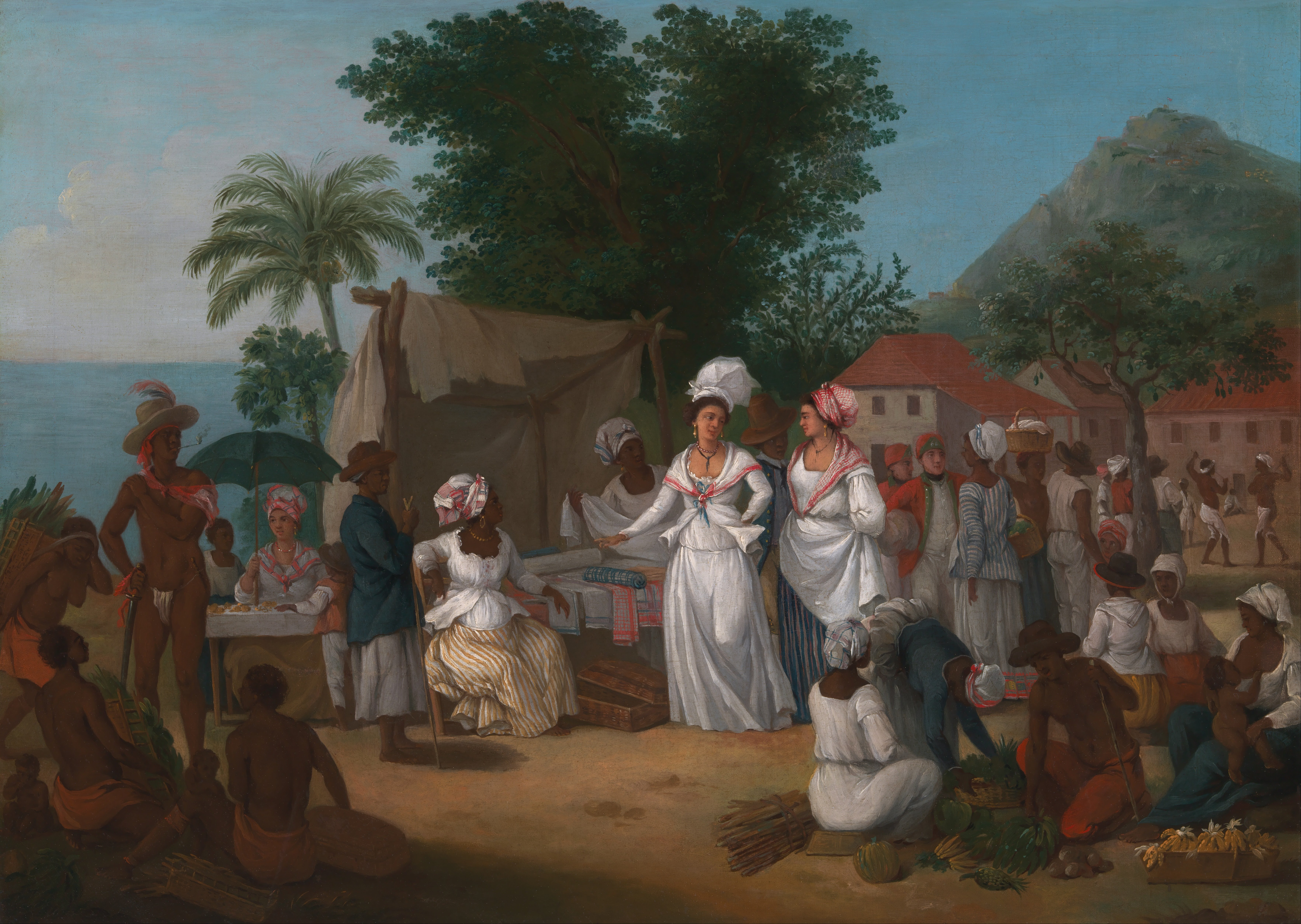
A linen market with enslaved Africans. West Indies, c. 1780

The demographic effects of the slave trade is a controversial and highly debated issue. While Jean-Noël Biraben estimates that sub-Saharan Africa represented about 18 percent of the world's population in 1600 and only 6 percent in 1900, the reasons for this demographic shift have been the subject of much debate. In addition to the depopulation Africa experienced because of the slave trade, African states were left with severely imbalanced gender ratios.

Walter Rodney argues that the export of so many people had been a demographic disaster which left Africa permanently disadvantaged when compared to other parts of the world, and that it largely explains the continent's continued poverty. He cites estimates showing that Africa's population stagnated from 1650 to 1900, while those of Europe and Asia grew dramatically. According to Rodney, all other areas of the economy must have been affected by the slave trade as the top merchants abandoned traditional industries in order to pursue slaving, and the lives of the labouring classes of the population were disrupted by wars fought to obtain captives and by kidnapping.

Other historians have challenged this view. J. D. Fage compared the demographic effect on the continent as a whole. David Eltis has compared the numbers to the rate of emigration from Europe during this period. About 50 million people left Europe for the Americas in the 19th century after 1820, a far higher rate than were ever taken from Africa. Thornton asserts that although not all scholars shared Walter Rodney's characterization of the trade between Africans and Europeans, "recent interpretations have continued to stress that African backwardness necessarily led it into a type of trade that diverted its potential to develop." He calls Rodney's views "radical" and argues that African states and elites voluntarily engaged in the slave trade with European traders who joined in a long established trade in enslaved people.

=== Cultural effects ===
Africans traded goods and slaves using trade routes in the interior of Africa that connected to the Sahara Desert and the Mediterranean coast where other commodities and enslaved people were traded. Gérard Chouin and Christopher Decorse refer to "the dense network of links between West Africa and North Africa." These trade routes were used by Africans for centuries, with societies and kingdoms developing as a result. Christina Mobley writes that the Atlantic slave trade disrupted the stability of West Central African societies, and uses the example of the Kingdom of Loango to demonstrate how the Atlantic trade exploited the established trade routes and markets under African control. Structural changes caused by this trade made the slave trade the new organizing principal of the region's economy.

Paul Lovejoy says the Portuguese explored the African coast as a way to avoid the Muslim middlemen who controlled the trans-Saharan trade, but in pioneering the sea route they actually expanded the established internal African trade. Portuguese and Muslim merchants played an active role in local West African commerce, and their operations connected sub-Saharan Africa with the Mediterranean region.

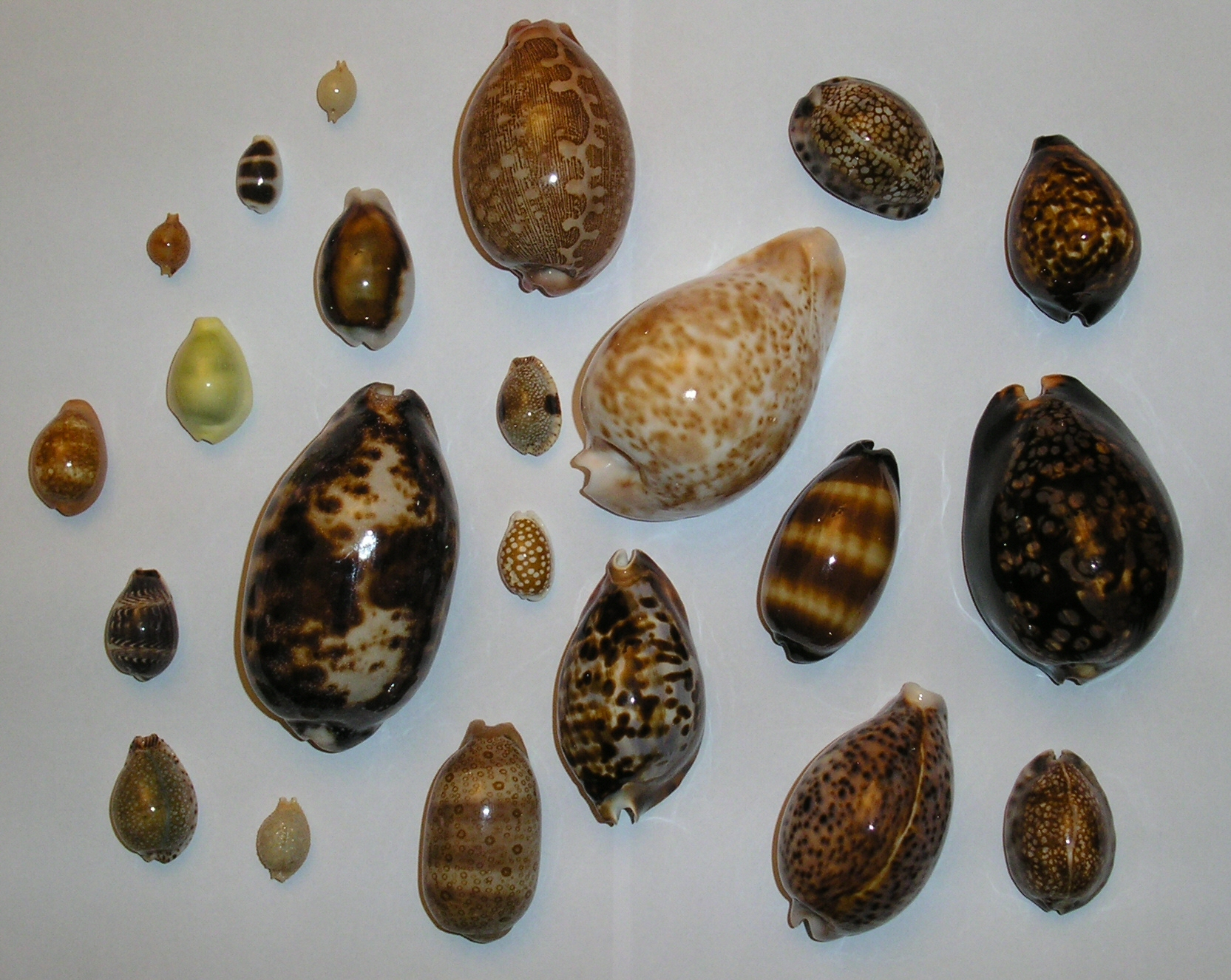
Cowrie shells were used as money in the slave trade.

The Andalusi Arab historian Ibn Sa'id al-Maghribi wrote in the 13th century of merchants who travelled across the Sahara desert from Sijilmasa in present-day southern Morocco to the ancient Ghana Empire in caravans loaded with salt, figs, copper, and cowries. By the time the slave trade to the New World grew to a large size in the 17th century, imported cowrie shells used as currency were already widely circulated in West Africa. Cowrie imports reached their highest levels with the peak in the slave trade in the 18th century. Europeans traded primarily along the Atlantic coast because they did not have immunity to the malaria endemic to the region; consequently they "could impose their military power no further than their guns could fire, from ship or fort."

Thornton contends that Africans accepted the institution of slavery in their own societies and were not compelled by any direct economic or commercial demands to trade in slaves. Other scholars, including Inikori, Lovejoy, and Whatley, hold that Europeans stimulated the slave trade indirectly by their control of tools of warfare such as guns, gunpowder, and horses, the so-called "gun-slave cycle". According to this hypothesis, Africans had little choice but to trade in slaves, because without this commerce they could not acquire the military technology needed to defend themselves from their enemies. Whatley (2018) said there was no scholarly consensus on this important issue.

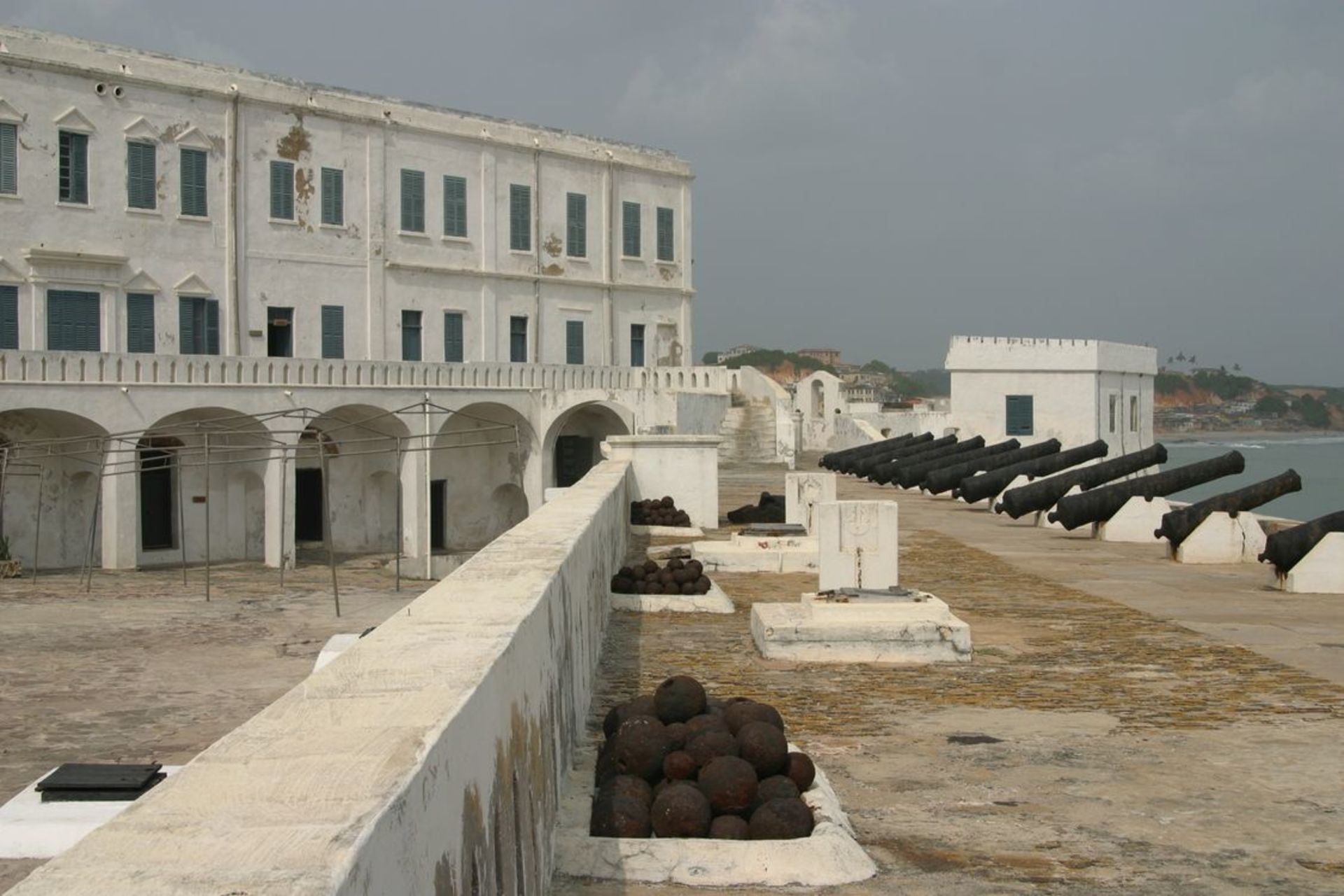
Elmina Castle

During the years of the slave trade, Europeans built slave fortresses along the Gold Coast in Ghana—the largest of these changed hands several times over the centuries, but by the second half of the 19th century they were owned and used by the British. Cape Coast Castle "was the headquarters in Africa of the entire British involvement in the transatlantic slave trade" from 1664 to 1807, and centre of the British colonial administration of the Gold Coast from 1807 to 1877. After that year the British authorities used the fort to imprison African leaders who organised resistance movements against colonization. The Osu (Christiansborg) Castle replaced the Cape Coast Castle in 1872 as the headquarters of the British colonial government and served as the seat of the post-colonial governments after Ghana won its independence in 1957 until 2013. In 1873, British ships bombarded and destroyed the restive African town that had grown up beside the Elmina Castle, following which the site was abandoned. In 1900, Yaa Asantewaa (Queen mother and war leader of the Ashanti people), was imprisoned at Elmina Castle because she led a war against the British for possession of the Golden Stool, or Ashanti royal throne.

== Legacy ==
=== Legacy of racism ===
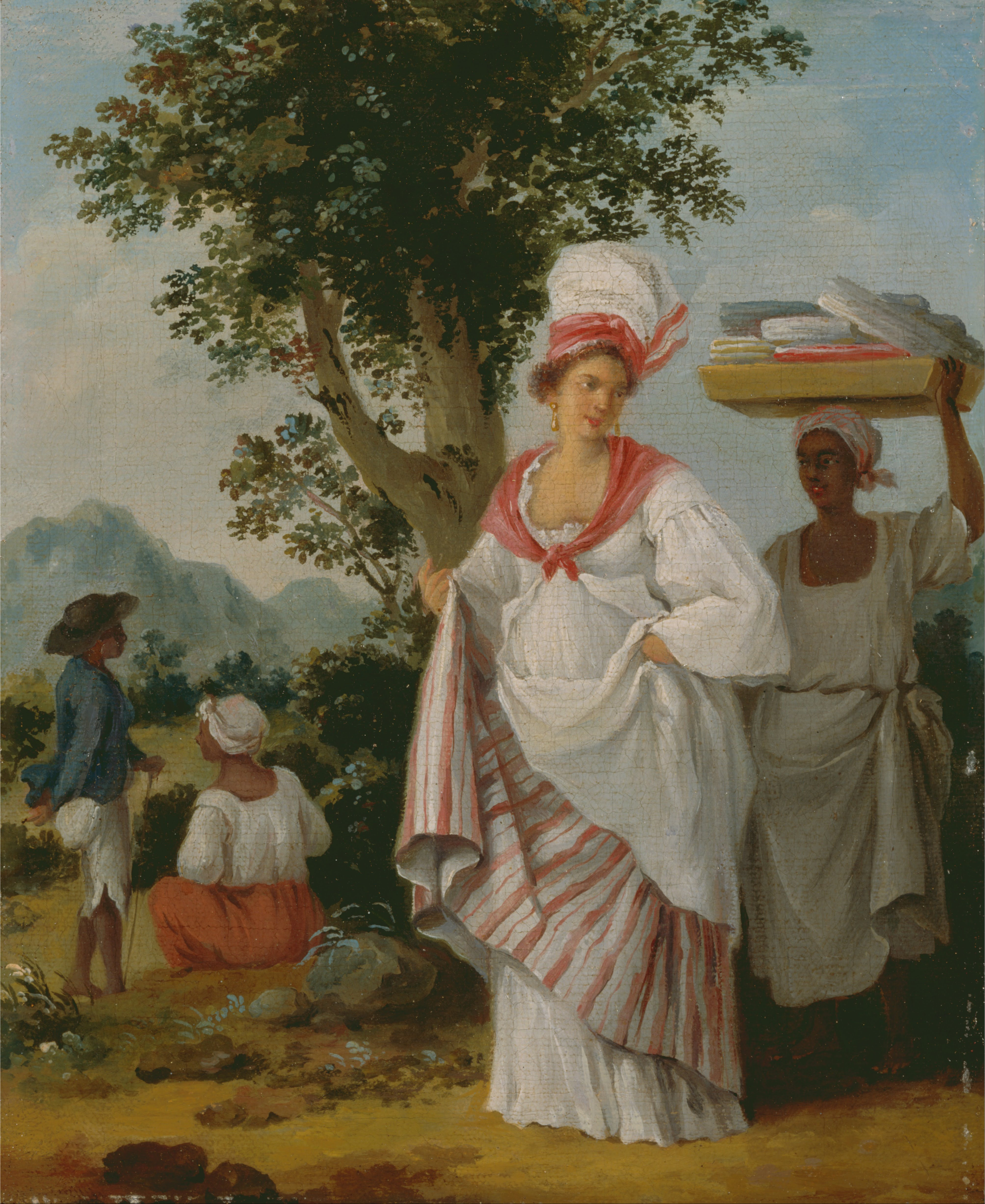
West Indian Creole woman, with her black servant, circa 1780

Walter Rodney states:

The role of slavery in promoting racist prejudice and ideology has been carefully studied in certain situations, especially in the USA. The simple fact is that no people can enslave another for four centuries without coming out with a notion of superiority, and when the colour and other physical traits of those peoples were quite different it was inevitable that the prejudice should take a racist form.

Eric Williams argued that "A racial twist [was] given to what is basically an economic phenomenon. Slavery was not born of racism: rather, racism was the consequence of slavery."

Similarly, John Darwin writes:

The rapid conversion from white indentured labour to black slavery [...] made the English Caribbean a frontier of civility where English (later British) ideas about race and slave labour were ruthlessly adapted to local self-interest [...] Indeed, the root justification for the system of slavery and the savage apparatus of coercion on which its preservation depended was the ineradicable barbarism of the slave population, a product, it was argued, of its African origins.

Although slavery was practiced in ancient times in various cultures, it did not have a global effect like the transatlantic slave trade and the chattel slavery created by Europeans in Africa and the Americas. The transatlantic slave trade's legacy is institutional racism on an international scale that led to racial discrimination in educational institutions and public places. After the publication of Charles Darwin's On the Origin of the Species, proponents of scientific racism seized on it to support their racial theories. Meanwhile, white supremacist scholars and scientists performed research on race and society to shore up their racist interpretations of the physical evidence they used to support their opposition to Black freedom.

=== Resettlement colonies ===
==== Sierra Leone ====
The historian Bronwen Everill describes how the English humanitarian Granville Sharp "determined to establish a homeland for freed slaves that would also serve to suppress the slave trade within Africa". In 1787, three ships bearing 459 settlers left London and arrived on the Sierra Leone shore as part of the utopian enterprise devised by Sharp (an abolitionist and a defender of London's poor Black community), Henry Smeathman (a naturalist), alongside the support of Olaudah Equiano and other active abolitionists. The diverse group of settlers included 344 Blacks from London, as well as 115 white wives and artisans. Sharp laid out the charter of the colony, called "Freetown", which was established on land inhabited by the Temne people, but the project soon collapsed, and by 1791, only 46 of the original settlers remained. Despite the hardships this first colony faced, the project was not abandoned and the Sierra Leone Company, run by a group of humanitarians, assumed control of Sierra Leone the same year. In 1792, 1200 Black Loyalists who had had been transported to Nova Scotia were brought to the settlement, and in 1800, 500 Maroons, free black Jamaicans, joined them. In the following decades, the Sierra Leoneans had difficulty persuading the Temne and Loko to give up the slave trade and cease slave raids on each other and the colony.

==== Liberia ====
In 1816, a group of wealthy European-Americans, some of whom were abolitionists and others who were racial segregationists, founded the American Colonization Society with the express desire of sending liberated African Americans to West Africa. In 1820, they sent their first ship to Liberia, and within a decade around two thousand African Americans had been settled there. Such resettlement continued throughout the 19th century, increasing following the deterioration of race relations in the Southern states of the US following Reconstruction in 1877.

The American Colonization Society's proposal to send African Americans to Liberia was not universally popular among African Americans, and the proposal was seen as a plot to weaken the influence of the abolitionist movement. The scheme was widely rejected by prominent African-American abolitionists such as James Forten and Frederick Douglass.

== Apologies and reparations ==
Countries that were involved in the transatlantic slave trade have had to decide whether or not to issue a formal apology for their historical role. Perhaps with the belief that a full apology would give rise to claims for reparations, the majority of countries have not taken that step.

In 2024, the Portuguese government rejected their president's suggestion that they should apologise and make reparations.

The United Kingdom has only expressed "profound sorrow", but avoided making a full apology. The British Government have confirmed that there is no intention to make any monetary payments in compensation for Britain's involvement in slavery or the slave trade. The United Kingdom listed a number of objections to supporting the 2026 vote on reparations at the UN, including that "we must not create a hierarchy of historical atrocities".

The Netherlands government made a full apology for their role in the slave trade in 2023, but ruled out paying reparations, as recommended by its own commissioned enquiry.

In 2001, France described slavery as a "crime against humanity", but has not made a formal apology. France abstained in the 2026 UN vote that called for reparations for "transatlantic chattel slavery".

In 2008, the United States House of Representatives passed a resolution apologising for American slavery. No serving US president has endorsed this. The US position on reparations, as expressed in 2026 at the UN, is that it does not "recognise a legal right to reparations for historical wrongs that were not illegal under international law at the time they occurred".

Most African countries with a history in the trade have avoided making apologies. An exception to this is Jerry Rawlings, when he was President of Ghana, making an apology in 1994. Also, in 1999, the president of Benin apologised to African Americans for his country's role in the transatlantic slave trade.

Some commercial and other organisations have investigated their histories during the Atlantic slave trade and issued apologies. In the UK, these include the Bank of England, apologising for the activities of some of its governors and directors in slavery (though the bank itself was, research shows, uninvolved), and Lloyd's of London, the marketplace which provided insurance services to the slave trade.

In modern times, the call for reparations for slavery and the slave trade originated with, among other people, Hilary Beckles. The Caribbean Community (CARICOM) are prominent in this, with a 10-point manifesto which lays out their reasons why apologies should be given and reparations made. Their arguments include the wealth generated by slavery and the slave trade (citing Eric Williams' book Capitalism and Slavery (1944)), systemic racism resulting from slavery and the disparity of compensating slave holders on emancipation, but not the enslaved. Ghana takes a leading role among African countries in calling for reparations.

Outside political and diplomatic opposition to full apologies and the payment of reparations, some historians and other academics point out what they perceive as flawed logic, mistaken understanding of history and other detailed arguments. Ethicist Nigel Biggar has published a detailed case on why Britain, and many British organisations, should not pay reparations. An earlier critic of the reparations campaign was Henry Louis Gates Jr., in 2010.

== See also ==
- Amerindian slave ownership
- Atlantic history
- Abolition of slavery in Spain
- Atlantic slave trade to Brazil
- Biography and the Black Atlantic
- Bristol slave trade (UK)
- Edward Colston
- European enslavement of Indigenous Americans
- Indian indenture system
- Liverpool slave trade
- The Slave Route Project
- Slave Trade
- Slave Trade Acts
- Slavery in Brazil
- Slavery in Britain
- Slavery in Canada
- Slavery in contemporary Africa
- Slavery in pre-Columbian America
- Slavery in the British and French Caribbean
- Slavery in the colonial United States
- Slavery in the Spanish New World colonies
- Slavery in the United States
- Tobacco and Slaves (1986 book)
- United States labor law
- Zephaniah Kingsley
- Treatment of slaves in the United States
