= Jonah's Gourd Vine =

1934 novel by Zora Neale Hurston

- Author: Zora Neale Hurston
- Language: English
- Publisher: J.B. Lippincott Company
- Publication date: 1934
- Publication place: United States
- ISBN: 978-0-349-01222-3

Jonah's Gourd Vine is Zora Neale Hurston's 1934 debut novel. The novel is a semi-autobiographical novel following John Buddy Pearson and his wife, Lucy. The characters share the same first names as Hurston's parents and make a similar migration from Notasulga, Alabama to Hurston's childhood home, Eatonville, Florida.

Hurston wrote the novel after publisher Bertram Lippencott read "The Gilded Six-Bits" and demonstrated interest. After its publication by J. B. Lippencott & Co, the novel received generally favorable reviews. The novel's title derives from Jonah 4.6–10, using the gourd vine from the passage as a metaphor for the main character of the novel, a philandering preacher.

The novel displays the experiences of Black life in the post-Reconstruction era. Hurston explores themes including marital dysfunction, generational trauma, and testimony.

== Background ==
Hurston first had the idea for Jonah's Gourd Vine while conducting research in New Orleans and the Bahamas on hoodoo practices and folklore. Hurston wrote Mules and Men and "The Gilded Six-Bits" before four different publishers expressed interest in her writing a novel. Hurston told an editor from the J. B. Lippincott Company that she was in the process of writing Jonah's Gourd Vine, though she had not started it, and finished writing the novel in about three months. The novel received largely favorable reviews, many of which were attributed to Hurston's use of dialect and folklore. This novel reflects the ideas and elements which Hurston focuses on in her following novels.

== Plot ==
The novel opens with a fight between John’s mother and stepfather, Amy and Ned Crittenden, ending with Ned verbally and physically abusing his wife. John hits Ned to defend his mother, and Ned demands that he leave the home. John does not argue, stating that leaving cannot be worse than living with Ned. His mother sends him to the plantation he was born on, owned by Alf Pearson, to seek out work.

On his way, John thinks of all the girls he will meet. Once he is “over the Creek” he encounters a girl named Lucy Ann Potts at a schoolhouse. Soon after, Alf Pearson tells John that he should attend school to learn how to read and write. John's relationship with Lucy develops as they interact in school and church. Lucy is from a well-off family that does not approve of John, but the pair still gets married nearly a year after meeting. Lucy moves onto Alf Pearson’s plantation with John, where they eventually have four children.

Lucy’s brother, Bud, tells his sister about John’s affair with Big 'Oman, who also lives on the plantation. Bud also claims he loaned John money and has not gotten it back. This results in John assaulting Bud and getting arrested. Alf Pearson suggests that John leave Notasulga to flee his legal troubles, so he takes a train to Florida, leaving Lucy and their children. He finds work, sends her money, and eventually reunites and settles his family in Eatonville, Florida.

John begins preaching and becomes pastor of his church. He rises in the community as a “moderator” in a church organization and then as mayor. John begins a relationship with Hattie Tyson. Members of his congregation suspect this relationship, telling Lucy about it and holding a secret conference to discuss John’s actions. Lucy continues to support and advise John, despite being aware of Hattie. Hattie asks a woman practicing hoodoo to help move her relationship with John along. Lucy falls ill and dies shortly after. The family grieves, but John feels “glad in his sadness” and marries Hattie three months later.

Rumors are prevalent amongst the congregation and John’s popularity plummets. He is married to Hattie for several years before he finds evidence of her use of hoodoo against him, and confronts and assaults her. She sues for divorce, and their marriage is annulled in court after John admits he is guilty. The church meets to discuss whether John should remain as their minister. This meeting reveals to John that he no longer has friends in his community. He leaves town and moves to Plant City, where he meets and marries a woman named Sally Lovelace.

One year later, John visits his old church in a Cadillac gifted to him by Sally. He discovers that the people there do not seem better off without him. One man suggests that John should preach on Sunday. A woman named Ora Patton waits for John by his car because she admires it. They kiss, and begin a relationship.

Later, after a visit with Ora, John feels angry with himself for once again giving in to his urges. John rushes home to be with Sally, thinking that God sent her to replace Lucy when a train hits and kills him. There is a large funeral with mourners from across the state, and a memorial held at the church he once preached at. The preacher recites a requiem poem and says that nobody knew John but God.

== Major characters ==
- John Buddy Pearson: The protagonist of Jonah’s Gourd Vine. John is the eldest son of Amy and the step-son of Ned. John's rise as a preacher and central figure in his community reflect his departure from his roots as the son of two poor formerly enslaved people. John's fall from this position is mostly due to an affinity for extra-marital relations. John marries three times in the novel. He proves himself to be unfaithful and has affairs with many women.
- Lucy Pearson: Formerly Lucy Ann Potts, the first wife of John Pearson. She is the first person John speaks to when he goes "over the big creek," he admires her intelligence and reading skills as they attend school together. Lucy supports her husband throughout the novel, guiding him through his mistakes and often serving as his conscience when he is acting immorally. Her death is a turning point in the novel and furthers the distrust growing in John's community against him.
- Amy Crittenden: John's mother, Ned's wife. Formerly enslaved by Alf Pearson, who fathers her first child, Amy represents the transition from slavery. She advocates for a better life for her children and feels excited about John's new opportunities when he leaves their home.
- Ned Crittenden: Amy's husband and John's stepfather. Ned abuses Amy, depicted in the first scene of the novel. The conflict represented between the two and between Ned and John is due to John's parentage and light skin color. Ned is a formerly enslaved person who resents the slave-holding class and is constantly impacted by his trauma.
- Alf Pearson: Wealthy plantation owner who used to enslave Amy. It is revealed that he is John's biological father, and he often takes up a parental role during John's time on Alf's plantation. Slavery has ended, and Alf continues to host Black people at his plantation for sharecropping labor. Alf comes to John's aid many times in the novel, providing advice and even a home for John and Lucy after they get married.
- Hattie Tyson: John's second wife. They have an affair while John is married to Lucy, and get married shortly after her death. She proves to be deceitful, seeking the help of a conjure woman's hoodoo practices to influence John. Hattie divorces John because he is unfaithful, which he admits in court. This leads to his leaving their church and town.
- Sally Lovelace: John's third wife. Sally meets John after his divorce from Hattie, showing him devotion and affection throughout their marriage. Sally represents a possibility for John's redemption, as he swears to be faithful to her and compares her to Lucy in his thoughts. John is driving a Cadillac Sally gifted him when he is killed. Sally receives settlement money that she wants to give his children, and she maintains that John stayed faithful in their marriage.

== Themes ==
=== Trauma and Testimony ===
The novel has many depictions of violence, often domestic in nature. The presence of violence represents the nature of race relations at the time and how it impacts social interactions. John demonstrates the impact of intergenerational trauma as the son of two formerly-enslaved people, experiencing economic slavery as a share-cropper. Ned Crittenden reflects this theme through his need to reestablish masculinity and power in his home, where he is cruel to his wife and children. Hurston contrasts Ned's resentment and treatment of his children with Amy's pursuit of a better and free life for them.

=== Marital Dysfunction ===
Many key events in the plot revolve around marriage and divorce. This is related to the theme of trauma, as Ned and Amy's relationship shows a need for active resistance against the impacts of intergenerational trauma. Hurston also examines her own parent's relationship through John and Lucy's marriage. John is unfaithful and physically violent with Lucy. After Lucy's death, he enters into an unhappy, violent marriage with Hattie. Even in a marriage where he is supported by Sally and swears to be faithful, John has an affair with Ora which leads to his death.
