= Dust Tracks on a Road =

Autobiographical book

- First edition
- Author: Zora Neale Hurston
- Language: English
- Publisher: J. B. Lippincott
- Publication date: 1942
- Publication place: United States
- ISBN: 978-0-06-200483-3 (Perennial softcover)
- OCLC: 235998426

Dust Tracks on a Road is the 1942 autobiography of Black American writer and anthropologist Zora Neale Hurston.

== Contents ==
It begins with Hurston's childhood in the Black community of Eatonville, Florida, then covers her education at Howard University where she began as a fiction writer, having two stories published under the guidance of Charles S. Johnson. It also covers her anthropological work under Franz Boas that led to her study Mules and Men (1935).

The Concise Oxford Companion to African American Literature says "its factual information is often unreliable, its politics are contradictory, and it barely discusses Hurston's literary career". As is the case of most of her writing, there is little discussion of issues of race and segregation.

== Writing and publication ==
The publishers forced extensive changes on the book, making Hurston remove a lengthy attack on American imperialism in Asia; she was also required to tone down sexually explicit anthropological content and remove some libellous passages. This resulted in a work that appeared not to condemn America's mistreatment of ethnic minorities and was consequently attacked for pandering to white audiences. More recent editions have attempted to insert deleted passages and reconstruct it closer to Hurston's intentions.

== Reception ==
It received more negative criticism than most of her other works: Robert Hemenway said it "probably harmed Hurston's reputation" and Alice Walker, otherwise an admirer, was also critical. Harold Preece, reviewing it in 1943 condemned it as "the tragedy of a gifted, sensitive mind, eaten up by an egotism fed on the patronizing admiration of the dominant world". However, Pierre A. Walker has suggested it represents a subversion of traditional autobiography through its fragmentary approach and rejection of the idea of a consistent personality.

Despite its questionable attitude to truth, and its many lacunae, it has been praised for its literary quality; The Concise Oxford Companion to African American Literature says "passages in Dust Tracks are as engaging as any Hurston wrote".

== Legacy ==
An excerpt from the book was recited in the film August 28: A Day in the Life of a People, which debuted at the opening of the Smithsonian's National Museum of African American History and Culture in 2016.

== Awards ==
It won the 1943 Anisfield-Wolf Book Award for its contribution to race relations.
