= St. Edwards Greenbelt =

Park in Austin, Texas

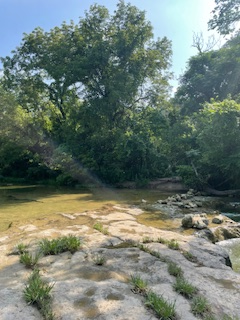
- Interactive map of St. Edwards Greenbelt
- Location: Travis County, Texas, U.S.
- Nearest city: Austin, Texas
- Coordinates: 30.406584°N 97.7960755°W
- Governing body: City of Austin Parks and Recreation

The St. Edwards Greenbelt, also known as St. Edwards Park, is an 80-acre greenbelt surrounding Bull Creek in northwest Austin, Texas.

== History ==
In 2021, the City of Austin purchased an additional 10 acres of land near Spicewood Springs Road with the intention of building a trail system connecting St. Edwards Park to Bull Creek District Park, creating a continuous trail system similar to the Barton Creek Greenbelt elsewhere in Austin.

== Features ==
The St. Edwards Greenbelt hosts 3.59 miles of hiking trails. Trails on the south and west side of Bull Creek have more varied elevation than those on the north and east side of the creek.
