= Mule Bone =

1930 play by Langston Hughes and Zora Neale Hurston

- Written by: Langston Hughes and Zora Neale Hurston
- Genre: Comedy

Premiere
- Date: February 14, 1991
- Place: Ethel Barrymore Theatre, New York

Mule Bone: A Comedy of Negro Life is a 1930 play by American authors Langston Hughes and Zora Neale Hurston. The process of writing the play led Hughes and Hurston, who had been close friends, to sever their relationship. Mule Bone was not staged until 1991, when it was produced in New York City by the Lincoln Center Theater.

== Characters ==
Jim Weston
A guitarist and Methodist.
Dave Carter
A dancer and Baptist. He is Jim's best friend.
Daisy Taylor
A domestic servant and Methodist.
Joe Clarke
The mayor, a Methodist.
Elder Simms
Methodist minister.
Elder Childers
Baptist minister.

== Plot synopsis ==
The play begins in Eatonville, Florida, on a Saturday afternoon with Jim and Dave fighting for Daisy's affection. The two men come to blows, and Jim picks up a hock bone from a mule and knocks Dave out. Jim is arrested and held for trial in Joe Clarke's barn.

On Monday, the trial begins in the Macedonia Baptist Church. The townspeople are divided along religious lines: Jim's Methodist supporters sit on one side of the church, Dave's Baptist supporters on the other. The issue to be decided at the trial is whether or not Jim has committed a crime. Jim admits he hit Dave but denies it was a crime. Elder Simms argues on Jim's behalf that a weapon is necessary to commit a crime, and nowhere in the Bible does it say a mule bone is a weapon. Elder Childers, representing Dave, says Samson used a donkey's jawbone to kill 3,000 men (citing Judges 18:18), so the hock bone of a mule must be even more powerful. Joe Clarke declares Jim guilty and banishes him from town for two years.

Act III takes place some time later, with Daisy encountering Jim outside of town. She tells him she's been worried about him, but he's skeptical. She demonstrates the sincerity of her affection and Dave comes upon the couple. The two men engage in a war of words to try to show which of them loves Daisy more. The contest ends when it becomes clear that Daisy expects her man to work for the white people who employ her. Jim and Dave are reconciled, and neither remains interested in courting Daisy. The two men return to Eatonville.

== Writing Mule Bone ==
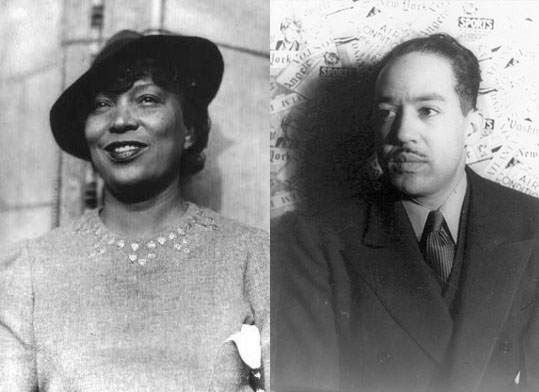
Zora Neale Hurston and Langston Hughes

Hughes and Hurston began writing Mule Bone in March 1930. They wanted to write a comedy about African-American life that didn't consist of racial stereotypes. They decided to base the plot on a folktale which Hurston had collected in Florida during one of her anthropological field trips. The two writers dictated their work to Louise Thompson, who typed it.

Their work was almost complete in June, when Hurston went away for the summer. She took her notes and said she would return in the fall, and they could finish the play. When Hurston came back, she would not return telephone calls from Hughes. She felt he wanted Thompson to be considered a third collaborator in the project, a proposal to which she strongly objected.

Concurrently, Hughes was in the process of severing his relationship with their common literary patron, Charlotte Osgood Mason (Mrs. Rufus Osgood Mason). Reviewers have conjectured that Hurston may have been trying to protect her own relationship with Mason by shunning Hughes.

Hurston submitted Mule Bone for copyright in October 1930, listing herself as the only author. In January 1931, Hughes learned that a copy of Mule Bone, bearing only Hurston's name, had been sent to the Gilpin Players, an all-black theater company in Cleveland, for their consideration. Hurston told Hughes that she had not sent them the play, which was true, but Hughes was furious. Hurston had sent Mule Bone to Carl Van Vechten, who sent it on to the Gilpin Players without her knowledge. Hughes sent a copy to apply for copyright under both their names.

In the meantime, the Gilpin Players wanted to stage the play. The work was still somewhat rough, but Hughes was in Cleveland, and he offered to help rewrite portions of the play. Hurston sent a telegram advising that she refused to allow the production. A day later, she sent another telegram authorizing the production on the condition that she be allowed to work with Hughes on changes. That same day, Hughes received a letter from Hurston saying that no part of the play had been written by him.

In light of all the off-stage drama, the Gilpin Players decided not to proceed with their production. The copy of Mule Bone in the Langston Hughes papers at Yale University has a hand-written notation by Hughes: "This play was never done because the authors fell out."

== 1991 production ==
Mule Bone was produced for the first time in 1991 by the Lincoln Center Theater, more than 60 years after it was written. It opened at the Ethel Barrymore Theatre on Broadway on February 14, 1991, to generally negative reviews.

Reviewing Mule Bone for The New York Times, Frank Rich wrote that it was "an evening that can most kindly be described as innocuous". He described it as a "broad, often bland quasi-musical". Also writing in The New York Times, David Richards said of Mule Bone: "it's just not a very good play." Both critics suggested the play might have been much better had Hughes and Hurston finished their collaboration.

The production closed on April 14, 1991, after 68 performances.

== See also ==
- Karamu House
