= Rufus Osgood Mason =

American Civil War surgeon

Rufus Osgood Mason (January 22, 1830, in Sullivan, New Hampshire – May 11, 1903, in New York City) was a physician, surgeon, and teacher and an early researcher in parapsychology and hypnotherapy.

== Biography ==
Mason was the son of Rufus and Prudence (Woods) Mason. He prepared for college at Thetford, Vermont, and later graduated from Dartmouth College in 1854. He then entered Union Theological Seminary (1854–1855) before moving to medicine. In 1859, he graduated from the College of Physicians and Surgeons in New York City (now a part of Columbia University). He became one of the most noted surgeons of his day in New York City.

During the American Civil War, he became an assistant surgeon for the United States Navy. From 1861 to 1864 he served on the USS Santiago de Cuba. In 1864 he took up medical practice in New York City, where he was attending physician at Northwestern Dispensary until 1869.

Between leaving Union Theological Seminary and entering the medical profession, he became an instructor at a public school in Cleveland, Ohio. It was there that he met, taught, inspired, and befriended William Rockefeller (brother of John D. Rockefeller).

Mason published his thoughts on metaphysical in books, magazines, and newspaper articles. His input would help in the early pioneer development of parapsychology and psychical research.

He was a contributing member of the Society for Psychical Research. His main publication was the book Telepathy and the Subliminal Mind (1897), and his work focused on case studies and popularization. His chief contributions to the field are considered to be the latter, in the United States, particularly relating to the work of the Society for Psychical Research and the theories of Frederic William Henry Myers.

The 50th annual convention of the Parapsychological Association, September 2007, acclaimed Mason as an early pioneer in parapsychology and psychical research.

He was married first in New York City to Marian Isabelle Goodwin in July 1871, and married second to Charlotte Louise Quick in 1886. After his death the latter used her inheritance to become a leading patron of the Harlem Renaissance.

== Works ==
- Telepathy and the Subliminal Self (Henry Holt and Company, New York, 1897)
