= Slave quarters =

Slave quarters were buildings or districts where enslaved people were housed. Slave quarters may refer to:

- Barracoon, temporary holding quarters for the transatlantic slave trade
- Senzala, housing for enslaved people in colonial Brazil
- Slave pens and slave quarters in the United States
