= Seraph on the Suwanee =

1948 novel by Zora Neale Hurston

- First edition cover
- Author: Zora Neale Hurston
- Language: English
- Genre: Historical Fiction
- Publisher: Scribner's
- Publication date: October 11, 1948
- Publication place: United States
- Media type: Print Hardcover

Seraph on the Suwanee is a 1948 novel by African-American novelist Zora Neale Hurston. It follows the life of a White woman and the fraught relationship she has with her husband and family.

The novel is noteworthy for its exploration of "white crackers" in Florida. Hurston's intention was to depict the linguistic and cultural similarities between White and Black people living in the South; it was her only novel about White characters. Seraph on the Suwanee has never been well received by African-American critics and scholars, who have often treated the novel as a "contrivance in Hurston's canon".

Hurston's final novel, it was written after her publisher rejected two novels about Black characters. She was eventually able to get the novel published by Scribner's.

== Plot ==
The novel opens during an unclear time period (though it is heavily implied to be some time during Prohibition) in Sawley, a fictional working-class town in rural western Florida. Sawley is the hometown of the Henson family, whose youngest daughter, twenty-one year old Arvay, lives at home with her parents and expresses desires to become a Christian missionary. Arvay had once been secretly infatuated with the town pastor, Carl Middleton, but Reverend Middleton marries Arvay's attractive older sister, Lorraine. The already meek and insecure Arvay responds to this by growing increasingly pious and isolated from the world; she uses her devotion to the Bible to justify her refusal to marry, going as far as to feign seizures to ward off potential suitors.

Jim Meserve, a hardworking, clever, and highly charismatic young man arrives in Sawley to work in a nearby turpentine camp. Jim demonstrates shrewd business acumen, quickly establishing a foothold in the local turpentine business, and develops an interest in courting Arvay. Though Arvay is attracted to Jim, she initially objects to his advances, insisting on her aversion to marriage and missionary aspirations. Jim dismisses Arvay's objections, teases her ignorance and simplicity, and even assaults her, leading to the two eloping soon afterwards.

Jim takes Arvay to live on his turpentine camp, where she becomes acquainted with Joe and his family – African-American workers under Jim's employment. Soon after Arvay gives birth to their first son, Earl, the small family moves to South Florida, settling in Citrabelle. Jim successfully establishes himself in the citrus business, and later into illegal alcohol distillery, soon amassing a fortune. Once Arvay and Jim build their house, their second child, Angeline, is born.

The Meserve's home life continues to be turbulent. Jim feels as if Arvay is too ignorant to understand how much he struggles for them. At the same time, Arvay feels a wedge between them as a result of Jim's coldness towards Earl versus his affection towards Angeline. As a result, their marriage is fraught with misunderstanding, distrust, and jealousy. Nevertheless, The Meserve family live comfortably; Arvay gives birth to their third child, Kenneth, or "Kenny." Joe, his wife, and their children soon arrive and are employed by Jim to take care of the Meserve's growing estate.

Despite his and Arvay's ongoing marital strife and Joe's eventual departure from the estate, Jim continues to work hard to support his family. He finds a legal source of income and becomes wildly successful in shrimping.

The Meserve's family strife worsens when the Corregios, a Portuguese-American family that Jim had become acquainted with through shrimping, came to work on the property. Earl starts acting more aggressively and spies on the family. Despite Jim's warnings, Arvay chooses to side with her son.

Earl is killed during a standoff after assaulting the Corregio's eldest daughter. His loss is felt most heavily by Arvay, with the remainder of the Meserves being apathetic towards his death.

The novel then fast forwards several years to the future. Angeline is now seventeen and in love with a boy, Hatton. Arvay is concerned about her daughter's infatuation, but Jim believes that Hatton is a capable man and the young pair soon elope without Arvay's knowledge; it is revealed later in the novel that Jim was there when the marriage took place.

Hatton proves to be a shrewd businessman, not too dissimilar to Jim. With Jim's guidance, Hatton begins a lucrative real estate business and he and Angeline move out. Kenny also finds success studying music at the University of Florida.

Jim starts to spend more days away from home, spending long days out at sea. With no one at home, Arvay grows listless, feeling that she lacks purpose. After Jim is nearly killed by a snake and Arvay fails to help him, he vents his frustrations. Before he leaves her, he gives her an ultimatum: he gives Arvay a year to "make the first move."

Utterly alone at home, she receives a message from her sister announcing that their mother is sick. Arvay uses this as an opportunity to leave the house and heads up to Sawley, which, since the time she has been gone, has modernized. At the same time, Lorraine and Carl have withered.

After her mother dies, Arvay is left the house. Bitter and jealous, Carl confronts her, asking her for money. However, Arvay manages to stand up for herself and Carl leaves defeated. He later flees with his wife, and their children, but not before stripping the Henson's house of all its valuables. Arvay is heartbroken, but she is filled with a new sense of determination. She burns down the house and returns to Citrabelle.

Upon returning to Citrabelle, Arvay and Jeff, one of Joe's sons, head up to meet with Jim at a shipping dock. When they meet, Jim warmly greets Arvay and brings her aboard one of his fishing boats, which he had named Arvay Henson. The pair reconcile on the boat, sleeping together in the cabin. The novel ends with Arvay introspecting on her life. She finds comfort in being with Jim, despite his abusive and manipulative behavior. The book closes with her sleeping next to Jim, sailing on the ocean.

== Characters ==
Arvay Henson: The younger daughter of Maria and Brock Henson, Arvay is described as being introverted and odd. She is described as being skinny, a trait found unattractive by the people of Sawley, with her only source of comfort being the pages of a Bible. Therefore, she is generally insecure and places much of her self-worth on the perceptions held by others. She grew up alone in poverty in the barren town of Sawley in West Florida, before being wedded to Jim Meserve and moving to the clandestine Citrabelle. Although she is initially hesitant to marry Jim, and the marriage does indeed turn out to be turbulent, through its trials she eventually discovers her value as a woman and wife. She discovers her worth as a mother, giving her children the childhood she never had. Arvay is an unorthodox feminist, and although believing that she deserves to be on equal terms with her husband, she finds solace in staying with him despite his harsh treatment of her.

Jim Meserve: Jim Meserve is Arvay's husband. He appears in Sawley out of the blue one day having traveled throughout the South, and he makes it his mission to court the timid Arvay. Jim holds some misogynistic views towards women and believes that Arvay, much like most other women, is ignorant and simple. Despite this, however, he works hard, moving his family to Citrabelle. He joins the citrus business, distills alcohol during the prohibition, and later joins the shrimping business. Despite his problematic behavior towards Arvay, he manages to become wildly successful and demonstrates a knack for hard work and resilience.

Larraine "Raine" Henson: Larraine is Arvay's older sister and the source of her sister's antagonism throughout some of the novel. Larraine is described as being the favorite child of the Hensons, always being treated better by her parents and by the people of Sawley. Due to her beauty and the attention she receives, Arvay is initially jealous of her. In the beginning of the novel, she marries Rev. Carl Middleton, whom Arvay had had feelings for. Later in the novel, Larraine's jealousy of Arvay's lavish lifestyle further drives them apart.

Earl "David" Meserve: Earl is the first and oldest son of the Meserves. He is born with several defects and intellectual disabilities that make his parents averse of him. Although Arvay tries her best to raise Earl normally, he is apathetic to his parents and is somewhat violent. After allegedly trying to shoot his younger brother, Kenny, he assaults a young woman. He is later shot during a standoff, after attempting to shoot his father.

James "Kenneth" Meserve: James is the second son of the Meserves. Throughout the novel, he is referred to as "Kenny." Kenny is a rumbustious young boy and soon picks up after his mother's love for music. He starts with the piano, before Joe teaches him how to play guitar with a bottleneck. As the novel progresses, Kenny demonstrates a talent for music. He joins the band at University of Florida, eventually playing with a famous band in New York.

Angeline Meserve: Angeline is the only daughter and youngest child of the Meserves. As a child, she demonstrates clear preference for Jim over Arvay. As a child, Angeline enjoys spending time with her brother and the two are depicted as being close. As a teenager, Angeline feels that she is too young to be with the boy she loves named Hatton. However, Jim quickly warms up to him. Together, Angeline and Hatton become successful real estate dealers.

Maria Henson: Maria is the mother of Lairraine and Arvay. Although not a prominent character in the novel, she is shown as being one of the few characters who genuinely cares for Arvay. Before her death, she gives Arvay sole possession of their house in her will.

Brock Henson: Brock Henson is described as being "a cracker from way back." He works hard, though he cannot provide much for his family.

Joe: Joe is an African-American friend of Jim Meserve. The two become acquainted at a turpentine camp, where Joe works under Jim. They form a deep friendship with one another. Joe eventually follows Jim to Citrabelle, also becoming a successful distiller before taking up more legal business.

Dessie: Dessie is Joe's wife and friend of Arvay. She acts as the midwife during the birth of Arvay's children, with herself having several children, also acquainted with the Meserves.

Alfredo Corregio: Mr. Alfredo is a Portuguese friend and coworker of Jim. The two men work together in the shrimping business. Soon after they meet, Alfredo moves his family to live and work on the Meserve's property.

Mrs. Corregio: Felicia is a White women married to Alfredo. Despite the family being White, Arvay feels a gnawing towards them, especially towards Felicia for what she thinks is betraying the race. Despite this, Felicia is described as "handsome woman."

Felicia Corregio: Felicia is the younger daughter of the Corregios and often played with the Meserve's children.

Lucy Ann: Lucy Ann is the older daughter of the Corregios. She is assaulted by Earl later in the novel, leading to his chase and subsequent death.

== Themes ==
=== Feminism and motherhood ===
One theme in Seraph on the Suwanee is feminism, albeit an unorthodox depiction of it. Lillie Howard, a scholar of African-American literature, suggests that Zora Neal Hurston's depiction of misogyny in her final novel is unparalleled to her previous works. Arvay's subservience to Jim and her epiphany that her purpose is to be a mother and wife, could suggest that Hurston implies that women should have the option to choose what kind of life they want. In the novel, Arvay feels lost when her children leave and Jim abandons her, as she never had to fend for herself. By being happy to serve, Arvay reveals that "people are individuals" and "what is right for one is not right for another."

Hurston also incorporated elements that celebrated female sexuality. In her foreword for the 1991 Harper Perennial edition of Seraph, Hazel V. Carby remarks on how blatant and explicit Hurston's depiction of sexuality is, especially from the perspective of Arvay. Indeed, Carby suggests that it was Hurston's intention to create an unconventional female protagonist whose sexual desires were front and center. This is depicted by Arvay's fantasies about Carl, and how Arvay essentially finds herself to be a slave to her husband Jim.

Not only is Arvay insecure about her position as Jim's wife, but she feels insecure and lacking as a mother. Despite believing that "her job was mothering," Arvay's relationships are tinged with a sense of inadequacy that bleeds into the relationships with her family. This is most sorely felt as Earl is constantly mistreated and shunned by Jim and the remainder of his family, while Arvay feels it her duty to take his side. Furthermore, she feels insecure when Angeline, her second child, takes a preference to Jim. This also adds tension to the marriage as Arvay struggles with feelings of inadequacy. These feelings are not alleviated until after Arvay's mother dies. Alone without anyone, Arvay burns the house that her mother left her in a symbolic gesture of starting anew. Arvay destroys the one thing that anchors her down to Sawley; it is a grandiose statement that depicts her growth from a girl to a woman. Indeed, Arvay's stay at Sawley challenged her in ways that she had not been previously. For the first time, Arvay was able to use her prestige to stand up to Carl when he accosted her for money. With nothing left for her in Sawley, Arvay takes this as the sign she needs to head back to find Jim.

Furthermore, by the end of the novel the people of Sawley have become more respectful towards her, a start contrast to the rumors and teasing she had endured as a young woman. In a moment of epiphany, Arvay realizes that it is Jim who had "put her Larraine ahead of the other girls" (298). It is arguable the relationship she had formed with Jim, and her children, was what had made her out to be as successful as she was. Without Jim, she would have been nothing, a slow realization that dawns upon her during her trip to Sawley after witnessing the state of Carl and her family.

=== The intersectionality of race and class ===
The fact that Seraph on the Suwanee focuses on White characters differentiates it from the remainder of Hurston's novels. Indeed, Arvay's life is informed by the fact that she is a White, formerly impoverished woman. Having grown up in a small White town, she speaks of "heathens" of other nations that must be introduced to Christ; likewise, her opinion of African-American characters is also clouded with racist prejudice (73). She even suspects the Corregios due to the fact that they are part Portuguese. Arvay is insecure about her femininity, relationship with Jim, and her Whiteness, which becomes plainly obvious as she denounces the Corregios while also commenting on the attractiveness of their daughter. She also suggests that they are influencing Jim and her children. Arvay, therefore, desires to occupy a higher social status by deriving privilege from her race.

Throughout the novel, Arvay begins to appreciate her increasing social status. Literary scholar Laura Dubek argues that Arvay benefits from Black labor; Jim's association with the Colored Town is how he manages to gain his wealth. Indeed, Joe and Corregio are the ones that aid Jim in accumulating the Meserve's wealth, though neither of them would be able to occupy the class that Jim and Arvay do.

== Critical reception ==
Seraph on the Suwanee was less of a hit than her previous novels and received mixed reviews from critics. On October 31, 1948, Frank G. Slaughter remarked positively in The New York Times on Hurston's portrayal of Arvay as a "Florida cracker of the swamps," describing her writing as a "mixture of excellent background drawing." Anne Whitmer, writing in September of the same year, complimented Hurston's use of "colorful Florida 'cracker' language." These praises highlight the way in which Hurston often used dialect in her novels.

However, Hurston's novel also received backlash. At the time of its publication, she was coping with false accusations regarding the assault of two young boys, and the sexual themes in the novel were used as evidence against her. Critics also bashed the "melodramatic ending." Contemporary critics such as Cheryl A. Wall criticize Hurston's dry portrayal of Arvay compared to her other female characters in previous novels.

=== Sexual abuse allegations ===
Following the publication of Seraph on the Suwanee, Zora Neale Hurston was falsely accused of sexually abusing two young boys. At the time, Hurston had been away in Honduras and denied the allegation. Despite this, newspaper syndicates continued to smear her name. The overtly sexual and provocative nature of Seraph was used as evidence of Hurston's proclivities. Purportedly, Seraph "advocated for sexual aggressiveness in women" and scenes were taken out of context in order to further accuse Hurston. Although the allegations were proven false, the damages done to her, particularly by the salacious and blatantly false articles published in the Baltimore Afro-American, destroyed her career.
