= Hitting a Straight Lick with a Crooked Stick: Stories from the Harlem Renaissance =

2020 book by Zora Neale Hurston

- Author: Zora Neale Hurston
- Publication date: 2020
- ISBN: 978-0-06-291579-5

Hitting a Straight Lick with a Crooked Stick is a compilation of recovered short stories written by Zora Neale Hurston. It was published in 2020 by Amistad: An Imprint of HarperCollins publishers. ISBN 978-0-06-291579-5

== Foreword ==
The foreword of Hitting a Straight Lick with a Crooked Stick, dated August 19, 2019, was written by Tayari Jones. Jones gives readers a perspective on Zora Neale Hurston's influence as a writer and how she chose to reveal herself through her writings. Through the stories of country folks, farmers, factory workers, and more, Hurston explores every capacity of the human experience. Jones also explains how Zora Neale Hurston shares her sense of humor with her audiences. An important aspect of Zora Neale Hurston's writings, according to Jones, is that even the happiest and funniest characters still get the blues. Jones describes how Hurston shares all walks of life through parents, lovers, children, spouses, and friends. Jones also explains how Hurston found inspiration from her hometown of Eatonville, Florida and made no attempts to hide its identity. Hurston loved her hometown and her writings are both love letters and testimonies to where she grew up. According to Jones, Hurston's stories are timeless as she portrays people with underlying power that they must find within themselves. Jones describes how Alice Walker found Zora Neale Hurston's grave and how Hurston was a victim of racism and sexism.

== Introduction ==
The introduction to Zora Neale Hurston's, Hitting a Straight Lick with a Crooked Stick, dated October 22, 2019, was written by Genevieve West. West makes the case that Hurston was ahead of her time in her critiques of race, gender, class, and art, and that she used romance to explore these topics. West also explains Hurston's desire to create stories that show the effects of the Great Migration and people moving between rural and urban environments. She outlines Hurston's academic experiences from high school to college at Howard University and shows how her education had a positive impact on her career as an author. West also provides information about Zora Neale Hurston's family history and shows how her experiences influenced her writings. West explains how Hurston's short stories opened doors that provided her with literary contacts and led to her finding a book publisher in the 1930s. The introduction is separated into sections called: "Hurston 'Really Did Get Born,'" "The Politics of Art in the Harlem Renaissance," "Interrogating the Politics of Gender and Class," "Exploring the Politics of Race and Class," and "The End of the Era."

== Short stories ==
These are the short stories included in Hitting a Straight Lick with a Crooked Stick.

=== John Redding Goes to Sea ===
John Redding Goes to Sea follows the story of the title character from childhood to adulthood. He longs to leave his hometown and explore the world, but his mother, Matty, is possessive and superstitious, and she claims to be ill to convince him to stay. His wife, Stella, works with John's mother to prevent him from traveling. He relinquishes his dreams and remains home with his mother and wife despite his efforts to educate himself. John eventually develops the urge to join the Navy. The night he planned to tell his family about his enlisting, he is killed while working to build a bridge on the St. Johns River. His body is not recovered from the river and his wish of travel is granted in death as he floats down the river toward the Atlantic Ocean.

=== The Conversion of Sam ===
This tale is about Sam Simpson and his goal to win over Stella, who has recently moved to Harlem from Virginia. Sam does all he can to impress the young woman, relinquishing his gambling lifestyle and getting a respectable job. Stella accepts his marriage proposal and they move into a quaint middle-class neighborhood, but Sam falls back into his old ways and gambles away all of their money. After Stella is injured while searching for him one night, Sam is determined to give up his unhealthy habits once and for all. When Sam begs to get his job back, his boss agrees under the condition that Sam does not relapse again. Sam continuously must make the choice between what he has always been and who he wishes to become.

=== A Bit of Our Harlem ===
A Bit of Our Harlem tells the story of a hunch-backed, orphan boy and a woman who has also lost both of her parents. They meet while the boy is selling cheap candy in the neighborhood. The two engage in a conversation that is filled with purity, sympathy, and a mutual respect for one another. The feeling of fellowship is something the woman desired but had not found amongst her own class.

=== Drenched in Light ===
This story, which takes place in Florida in the 1920s, follows a child named Isis Watts and her desire to have fun instead of doing chores for her grandmother. During an afternoon of make-believe she adorns herself in her grandmother's new tablecloth and follows a marching band to a nearby carnival where she has the time of her life dancing. When her grandmother finds Isis, she demands that Isis return home, but Isis runs away, claiming that she wants to die. However, a white woman passing her in a car with two men asks her to come with them, saying that they she wants Isis's sunshine to seep into her soul.

=== Spunk ===
This early short story follows the title character as he does what he pleases. Spunk Banks flaunts his affair with Lena Kanty to the town of Eatonville, FL, including Lena's husband, Joe Kanty. The other men make fun of Joe for appearing weak because he does not confront Spunk. When Joe works up the gumption to approach Spunk while armed with a razor blade, Spunk shoots him dead. Spunk goes to trial but is acquitted on grounds of self defense. However, Spunk begins to believe that Joe in the form of a ghost is seeking revenge. Spunk meets his untimely end when what he thinks to be the spirit of Joe pushes him into a moving saw at his job.

=== Magnolia Flower ===
Magnolia Flower is told from the perspective of the St. Johns River. This mystical tale is about Bentley, an escaped former slave. He builds a village along the river and marries a Cherokee woman, Swift Deer. Magnolia Flower is the name they give their daughter. Years later, a man named John comes to the village with the desire to build a school. He and Magnolia Flower fall in love, but Bentley develops a hatred for John because of his similarities to white men and sentences him to death. But before he can carry out this sentence, Magnolia Flower and John flee the village. They return to the same place on the river forty years later.

=== Black Death ===
This story is about Mrs. Boger's revenge against Beau Didley, who has deceived her daughter Docia into thinking that he loves her. When Docia becomes pregnant, instead of marrying her Beau slanders her name among the townspeople of Eatonville. Furious about his treatment of her daughter, Mrs. Boger goes to a witch doctor to purchase a deadly revenge against him. The witch doctor's mirror shows Beau's death and the next day he is found dead with a mysterious burn mark on his chest. His death is ruled the result of natural causes and Mrs. Boger and Docia move to Jacksonville to live happily ever after.

=== The Bone of Contention ===
In this story, Joe Clarke owns the town of Eatonville. He calls for a trial to determine whether Jim Weston is guilty of stealing and should be exiled from Eatonville. Joe led the trial. However, after allowing for rebuttals and arguments, he ends the trial early. As the owner of the town, Joe wanted to show his power by ending the trial and deciding the punishment for Weston himself.

=== Muttsy ===
In this tale the title character is a notorious gambler who falls in love with a young woman named Pinkie Jones who has recently moved to Eatonville, Florida from Harlem. He pays for her accommodations, but she is guided by a strong moral compass and flees to get away from him and the loose company that he keeps. Pinkie's resistance increases Muttsy's desire for her and makes him realize that to keep her he must stop gambling. He get himself an honest job and persuades Pinkie to marry him, but he falls back into his bad habits and starts gambling again.

=== Sweat ===
This story is about Delia Jones, a hardworking Christian woman who is being abused by her unfaithful husband, Syke Jones. He tries to drive Delia away by making her life miserable, but she refuses to leave the home her father gave her and that she has worked so hard to maintain. Taking advantage of Delia's intense fear of snakes, Syke first places a rattlesnake outside the house and then in her laundry hamper. Syke's plan for the snake to bite and kill Delia are upended when Delia escapes and the rattlesnake bites him instead, causing him to have an agonizing death.

=== Under the Bridge ===
This story presents a love triangle between 58-year-old Luke Mimms, his new 19-year-old wife, Vangie, and his 22-year-old son, Artie. The new family unit finds peace with each other until the friendship between Vangie and Artie begins to advance into something more. Luke becomes increasingly jealous, leading him to try to use hoodoo charms to halt Artie and Vangie's love. In a heated moment, Luke finds he has lost the charm, reversing the effects. Luke must then watch Artie and Vangie kiss and feel emotionally betrayed.

=== 'Possum or Pig? ===
In this story, John suspects that an enslaved man who has been loyal to him may be stealing his pigs. When John confronts the enslaved man, his suspicions are confirmed.

=== The Eatonville Anthology ===
The editors of this book have grouped Hurston's very short stories into "The Eatonville Anthology." These vignettes present episodes from the lives of the townspeople as they interact with each other.

- The Pleading Woman: Mrs. Roberts begs for food from people in the community, including Joe Clarke. He grows irritated because he knows that her husband provides well for her. However, her needs cannot be satisfied and she returns to beg day after day.
- Turpentine Love: Jim Merchant continues to love his wife even after all her teeth have to be pulled out. One day his wife's mother comes with turpentine to treat one of Mrs. Merchant's fits. The turpentine accidentally leaked into her eyes, curing her ailments.
- Story III: A woman named Becky Moore has 11 children. The narrator blames the fathers of the children for the fact that Becky is unmarried. The other mothers in town become afraid that this is contagious and refuse to let their children play with hers.
- Tippy: The title character of this story is Syke Jones's dog. Tippy is described as the most interesting member of the Jones family and a lover of bones. However, there is a death sentence hanging over Tippy's head for stealing meat and eggs. None of the many attempts on his life have been successful and Tippy continues to be friendly to everyone he encounters.
- The Way of a Man with a Train: Old Man Anderson has lived in the woods with no desire to see a train, but one day he decides to lead his horse to a railway station. Anderson is startled by the roaring engine and the oncoming smoke from the train and flees the station.
- Coon Taylor: The title character is a thief in Eatonville who steals chickens, watermelons, and muskmelons. Coon Taylor has never been caught for his crimes until Joe Clarke took it upon himself to catch him in the act. His first attempt fails when Joe falls asleep and a melon is accidentally busted on his head. In his next attempt, Joe catches Coon stealing sugarcane and forces him to eat every last bit. Then Joe banishes him from Eatonville for three months.
- Village Fiction: Joe Lindsay, Lum Boger, and Brazzle compete to be considered the town liar. In Exhibit A, an anonymous person claims that they witnessed a doctor in Orlando remove the organs from a woman's body and successfully return them to her body.
- Story VIII: A man named Sewell keeps to himself and moves from place to place often.
- Story IX: This story describes the abusive relationship between Joe Clarke and his wife. As a young man, Mr. Clarke would beat his wife publicly, but now he waits until they get home.
- Story X: Mrs. McDuffy shouts loudly in church and her husband would beat her at home. Elijah Moseley, who inquires about the situation, learns that Mrs. McDuffy yells so loudly to spite her abusive husband.
- Double-Shuffle: This story focuses on the pre-foxtrot dancing style that the people in Eatonville liked to dance before WWI. The narrator describes this dancing style as much cooler and more rhythmic than that performed by white people.
- The Head of the Nail: Daisy Taylor, who is known as the town flirt, is having an affair with Mr. Crooms and relentlessly taunts his shy wife, Laura, about it. One evening after more taunting a town gathering, Laura shocks the town when she attacks Daisy with an axe handle. Laura, sticking up for herself, works, and Daisy leaves Eatonville for Orlando.
- Pants and Cal'line: Mitchell Potts is unfaithful to his wife, Cal'line, and mocks her by buying shoes for his mistress, Miss Pheeny. However, Cal'line is known for being feisty and standing up for herself. One day, when Mitchell leaves to see his mistress, Cal'line follows him with an axe gripped in her hand.
- Story XIV: This story is a retelling of the children's story, "Br'er Rabbit." In Zora Neale Hurston's version, Mr. Dog and Mr. Rabbit are best friends but are both in love with Miss Nancy Coons. Nancy admires them both, but is drawn to Mr. Dog more because of his melodious singing voice. Mr. Rabbit is unable to sing but promises to help Mr. Dog so that he could win Nancy's heart. He advises Mr. Dog to stick out his tongue, and when he does, Mr. Rabbit cuts it with a knife.

=== Book of Harlem ===
This story is about Mandolin who, looking for excitement, has recently moved from Georgia to Harlem, where he is not welcomed with open arms by the women. So that he will fit in better, his roommate suggests that Mandolin change his clothes and hair, and learn how to dance to jazz. When these changes work, Mandolin begins to attract women andbecomes introduced to the literary side of Harlem. Mandolin's friends rename him Panic, and he gradually becomes a well-respected figure in the art community under his new persona.

=== The Book of Harlem ===
As in the story about Mandolin, Jazzbo has moved from the South to Harlem, where he is given advice on how to change himself to fit in and be accepted among the Negroes there. A key difference between the two stories is that as Jazzbo attracts more women, he finds sexual liberty. Jazzbo marries a girl who is a self-proclaimed virgin.

=== The Back Room ===
The story of The Back Room begins with Lilya Barkman, a woman living as a member of the elite class in Harlem. Lilya only cares about her youth and beauty. Her struggles begin when she must cope with the consequences of age. She was successful in her life because she could manipulate men with her good looks. She was a prize that no man could catch or marry. Upon realizing that there are younger women who may steal the affections of the men she seduces, she must make a choice to marry one of the men in her life- Bill or Bob. However, Lilya is too late. They both grew tired of her stringing them along and fell in love with other women, leaving Lilya to age alone.

=== Monkey Junk ===
In this story, a man living in Harlem claims he will never marry because he knows the "truth" of how women are. However, one day he finds a woman who tries to win him over with money. He fails to recognize that she is a greedy woman and marries her. Eventually she turns to other men for money, betraying their marriage. The man attempts to leave her and take all the money. While in court, the man acts overly confident and the woman convinces the judge that she has misfortunes that require more financial support. In the end, the woman is victorious and the man is forced to leave Harlem penniless and move to the South.

=== The Country in the Women ===
Caroline and Mitchell Potts have recently moved from a small Florida town to Harlem. Caroline is described as temperamental and unpredictable, a tough woman who does not tolerate disrespect. Mitchell, who is a notorious cheat, believed that Caroline would quit interfering with his affairs after moving from their rural town. However, Caroline remains steadfast in her ways and Mitchell grows frustrated with her unwillingness to conform to the culture of city life in the north. Mitchell continues on with his affairs and claims to have change Caroline's ways. One day Caroline seeks revenge by following Mitchell and his mistress with an axe. Mitchell learns that the country could not be taken out of the woman.

=== The Gilded Six-Bits ===
Joe and Missy May Banks are a young, newlywed couple whose relationship is depicted as playful and affectionate. However, their marriage is threatened when Mr. Slemmons distracts Missy May with his wealth, diminishing Joe's confidence. The relationship becomes icy after Joe returns home early and finds Missy May in their bedroom with Mr. Slemmons. Joe assaults Mr. Slemmons, driving him from the room, and is left holding the part of the chain from Mr. Slemons's watch with a gold coin. It symbolizes how the affair is a wedge in a marriage that persists despite the loss of joy it once brought them. From the outside, they seem to be a happy couple, but their feelings for each other have changed. When Missy May finds that Joe has put the coin under her pillow, she wonders if he is treating her as a prostitute but notices that the gold coin is only a gilded "four-bit piece," not as valuable as she assumed. Her marriage reaches a turning point months later when she gives birth to a son who is "de spittin' image" of Joe. Though their marriage has gone through turmoil, their love proves able to withstand it, and the couple is stronger because of it. The love between Joe and Missy May was not just gilded but a solid love.

=== She Rock ===
Like the "Book of Harlem" stories, this one is told in a mock Old Testament style. Oscar decides to leave his wife, Cal'line, in Sanford while he moves to Harlem with his brother Hiram. However, when they arrive at the train station, Cal'line is waiting there with her bags. As in The Country in the Women, Oscar then hopes that Cal'line will change her ways and conform to Harlem customs after she arrives. He sees Harlem as an opportunity to date as many women as he wants while remaining married. When he takes a mistress, Cal'line waits patiently while stalking the couple. Oscar claims to others that he has changed Cal'line, but after he buys a seal skin coat for his mistress, she uses an axe to break into the apartment where Oscar and his mistress are partying. Oscar flees out a window and Cal'line assaults his mistress. Resigned to the stubborn "narrow mind" of his wife, Oscar retreats to Sanford.

=== The Fire and the Cloud ===
This story is a take on a conversation between Moses, the Bible character, and a lizard. Moses is seated upon his grave watching his people travel to Canaan when the lizard appears from a hole beneath Moses. The lizard strikes up a conversation, but Moses's head is "enveloped in a dense white cloud" and the lizard returns to his hole. When the lizard reappears, comments on Moses's power to summon a swarm of flies for the lizard to eat each day. Moses describes what he has accomplished in his life, which leads the lizard to believe that Moses must be widely loved. Moses says that he was chosen by God to lead but does not understand why, and that Joshua will follow in his footsteps. When asked, Moses says that at times his service brought him great joy, but his people kept trying to undermine him, which causing him to lose strength. Moses returns to the clouds, feeling worried about the impression he has left on the world.

== Reception ==
A review of Hurston's novel was featured on The Guardian in the article, "Hitting a Straight Lick with a Crooked Stick, by Zora Neale Hurston review - wickedly funny," written by Colin Grant. Grant begins his review by explaining how eight of the short stories from Hurston's collection are recovered from the Harlem Renaissance anecdotes from the 1920s and 1930s. Grant goes on to provide examples and analysis as to how specific tales such as Sweat, and The Country in the Woman, support Hurston's theme of "feisty women" overcoming abusive men in their lives. Grant also explains how Muttsy, and In Under the Bridge, are examples of Hurston's critique of relationships and the treatment of women. Grant also highlights how Hurston brings attention to themes of self-loathing and "deference to whites that pervade black communities." Additionally, Grant points out how jealousy is a frequent theme in Hurston's tales as she warns readers of its effects. Lastly, Colin Grant also addresses how the editor chose not to change the original grammatical idiosyncrasies of Hurston's writings. Hurston wrote in a way that is reflective of the Floridian vernacular of her hometown, Eatonville, which Grant claims adds "an edge" to the tales.

Additionally, Jabari Asim says in his article, "The Harlem Renaissance Through Zora Neale Hurston's Eyes," for The New York Times how Hitting a Straight Lick with a Crooked Stick paved the way for Zora Neale Hurston's status as an icon. The short stories are presented in the order they were written, showing her growth as an author as she created more works. Asim commends Hurston for finding humor in the midst of tragedy, but acknowledges how this humor could become confusing for uninformed audiences. Asim highlights how Hurston creates characters who survive in the midst of mayhem, navigate the feelings of love, and face obstacles. There is a "willingness to live" in Hurston's characters as she shared the stories of everyday black people doing normal, mundane things.
