= How It Feels to Be Colored Me =

Essay by Zora Neale Hurston

"How It Feels to Be Colored Me" (1928) is an essay by Zora Neale Hurston published in The World Tomorrow that examines her identity in the scope of how her environment influenced her experiences and increased awareness of her skin color both positively and negatively.

== Background ==
Hurston moved to Eatonville, Florida, an all-black town, at just one years old, where she resided until age thirteen when her mother died. Her family moved with hopes to seek better opportunities as African Americans, which they were able to do with Zora’s father, John Hurston, being a pastor and eventually becoming the mayor of Eatonville. After the death of her mother in 1904, Hurston was forced to live with relatives in Jacksonville, Florida who were working as domestic servants. This new environment differed greatly in terms of racial hostility. At her new school, she faced high racial discrimination, which she references in her essay stating she felt, “most colored when thrown against a sharp white background”. Eatonville and Jacksonville are the main settings of this essay as Hurston uses them to differentiate versions of herself and her feelings of both heightened and lowered social awareness. Before moving, she recognized racial differences by the fact that white people did not reside in Eatonville, however, while in Jacksonville the differences became a tactic of attempted degradation.

== Summary ==
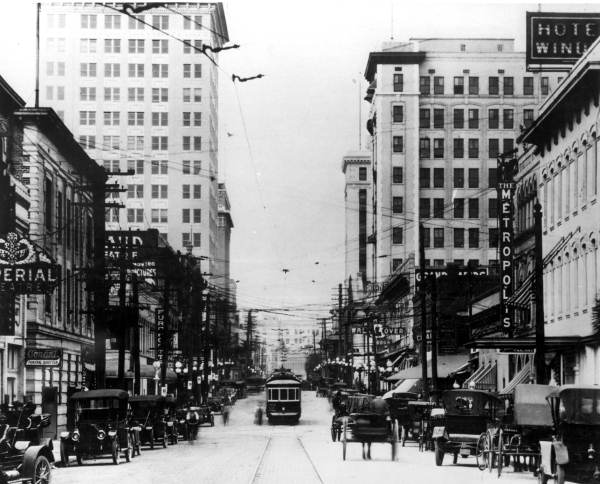
Downtown Jacksonville in 1914

Hurston begins her essay by redefining the word colored. She does this indirectly by using experiences to exemplify that although she recognizes that she appears differently from others, however, she did not feel those differences until later in life.

The story is first set in the town of Eatonville, Florida, her childhood town, where the color of her skin tone was never relevant to her daily life. She speaks of the community she grew up in where her only interactions with white people were when they were driving through the town. She describes watching them from her front porch and dancing and singing for them in return for money. She admits that these actions brought her so much joy that she needed bribing to stop rather than continue. The other colored people disliked these actions but nevertheless they were accepting of her.

However, once she arrived in Jacksonville, she felt she was no longer the same, she was only a colored girl. Once leaving her hometown, Hurston realizes the sheltering of Eatonville, as it was a safe zone for her since it was considered a colored town. Despite her new environment, Hurston stands strong in her belief that she is not tragically colored, therefore she does not pity herself. She acknowledges the previous adversities faced by her race, yet she does not allow that nor the students who are constantly reminding her, to define her. This mentality, however, does not prevent her from feeling a sense of loneliness and isolation. Some days she feels like her old self and some days she realizes differences among herself and others surrounding her. She mentions her experience at a jazz club with a white friend, where through the music she expresses the racial differences and distance between their lives. The music she heard, translated deeper than a sound, but for her friend it was only a nice song.

She concludes her essay acknowledging the differences between the races but refuses the idea of separation. In her final paragraph, she uses a metaphor to compare herself to a brown paper bag filled with random bits. This symbolizes the uniqueness of every human being as everyone is a different colored paper bag filled with different small bits and pieces. This further disputes the claims of separation by acknowledging that every race is essential and special to God, who she refers to as the Great Stuffer of Bags. She encourages one not to focus on race, but one’s self-awareness and the similarities we all have in common.

== Eatonville, Florida ==
Eatonville, Florida was chartered on August 18, 1886, as the first all-black incorporated town in the United States. Eatonville was started by Joe Clark, a black man who was elected as the town marshal of Maitland, Florida. This decision was supported and led to its incorporation next to Maitland. The town was strongly religious with specific culture and depended on each other as a community. Although Hurston’s hometown was extremely impactful on her upbringing which she shares in her writing, she also clarifies that she did not idealize it. Eatonville, like most towns, had both good and bad parts. After her father remarried, Zora never returned to Eatonville, but it is important to understand the town in efforts to better understand her.

== Critical analysis ==
In the essay, Hurston’s description of entertaining white people who drive through the city of Eatonville is interpreted as the writing style of inside/outside, where she mentally reverses the roles of what is actually occurring. Some conclude that this is a strategy of survival, representing the “happy darkie“, and although it was looked down on by many it was beneficial to her. Throughout the work, Hurston sarcastically yet indirectly addresses stereotypes about African American culture and the current political nature. This is embedded throughout her writing and a part of why her writing style was so unique during this time period. Her work could be interpreted as the shade of color, iridescent, because it appeared differently depending on who was reading it. As most African American writers at the time were expected to write about oppression and suffering, it was argued that her intention was to contradict that by controlling her own identity. She importantly notes that she is not tragically colored. This powerful yet controversial statement was unheard of at the time and is one of the ways she shows her complex identity to the readers.

== The Harlem Renaissance Period ==
The Harlem Renaissance ultimately became the heart of jazz, art, and fashion, but began as a movement of African Americans to the city chasing economic prosperity and equality. Zora Neale Hurston is recognized as a writer who moved to Harlem in 1925 during this period. The effects of this period were long lasting as it laid the foundation for a new wave of African American writers after them. Hurston among other female writers of this period are notable for navigating additional intersectional challenges such as gender and class.
