= Barracoon (disambiguation) =

A barracoon is a type of barracks used historically for the temporary confinement of slaves or criminals.

Barracoon may also refer to:

- Barracoon: The Story of the Last "Black Cargo", a book by Zora Neale Hurston published in 2018
- Barracoon, a 1950 novel by Harry Hervey
