= Harold Preece =

American folklorist

- Born: Harold Richard Preece; January 16, 1906; Bull Creek Community, Texas, U.S.
- Died: November 24, 1992 (aged 86); Edmond, Oklahoma
- Occupations: Journalist, folklorist, historian
- Writing career
- Period: 1922–1980s
- Genres: American folklore, Western history

Harold Richard Preece (January 16, 1906 – November 24, 1992) was an American writer notable for his early involvement in civil rights, his status as an authority in American folklore and Western histories, and his friendship with Robert E. Howard, the creator of Conan the Cimmerian.

== Biography ==
Preece was born in 1906 in Bull Creek Community near Round Rock, Texas. He was a ministerial student at Texas Christian University with special studies at the University of Texas.

In the 1940s he moved to Monteagle, Tennessee. In 1941 he met his wife, Ruth Kruskal Preece (aka Celia Kraft). They had at least one son, Hillel David Preece. Preece and Kraft collaborated on a book published in 1946, in which year they also moved to New York City. The Preeces later separated.

Preece met poet Winona Morris Nation in 1978, with whom he lived in later years. He developed Alzheimer's disease towards the end of his life, and died less than a month after Winona in 1992. He was cremated and his ashes scattered on Winona's grave in the Spring of 1993. She is buried at Hillcrest Cemetery, on a hill overlooking Comanche, Oklahoma.

=== Writing career ===
Preece "began his career as a cub reporter for the Austin Statesmen in 1922, started selling articles to magazines in 1925, and became a free-lance writer and specialist in American and Texas folklore." He was the Americana expert for Adventure magazine, considered by editor Ken White as "our final court of appeal" on the subject. Preece also assisted John and Alan Lomax in collecting archives of American folk music for the Library of Congress. He was the folklore editor of the Federal Writers' Project in Texas.

Preece's main impact, however, came in his writings on civil rights, not least because of his unusual status as a southern white man supportive of Negro issues. He described his evolution from prejudice to anti-racism in the August 1935 article "Confessions of an Ex-Nordic: The Depression Not an Unmixed Evil," which appeared in Opportunity, the monthly journal of the National Urban League. He attributed his change in outlook to the shared hardships of the Great Depression: "I waited in line with other men – white and black who spent their days frantically wandering to obtain the same tawdry necessities. Forgetful of Jim Crow we discussed the appalling debacle and shared crumbs of cheap tobacco. ... To me, white and black no longer exist. There are only oppressors and oppressed."

Arthur I. Hayman, his collaborator on a book exposing problems in Liberia, wrote that Preece became "widely known as a champion of the race ... particularly ... for his sympathetic studies of the great Negro folk culture."

In addition to Opportunity, Preece wrote for American Spectator, Crisis, New Masses, Nation, and other liberal/left-wing publications. His most influential work was likely his regular column "The Living South" in the Negro newspaper The Chicago Defender. Texas politician Martin Dies criticized Preece's newspaper articles, referring to him as a "negro writer." Preece rejoined that he was white but not insulted, taking his stand with the Negro.

One of Preece's more controversial stands was a review of Zora Neale Hurston's Mules and Men published in Crisis, December 1936: "When an author describes her race in such servile terms as 'Mules and Men' critical members of the race must necessarily evaluate the author as a literary climber."

While living in Tennessee he worked with the Highlander Folk School, was president and managing editor of New South Features, and staff-writer for the inter-racial magazine Now, and Southern correspondent for Religious News Service.

Preece corresponded with Roy Wilkins and W. E. B. Du Bois as a fighter for civil rights. He continued his support for civil rights in New Masses as well. He took on the Ku Klux Klan in the October 16, 1945 issue, with the result that "[i]n 1946 the Ku Klux Klan chased him and his family out of the state, and they moved on to New York."

Around this time he became a regular contributor to Texas Rangers and Zane Grey's Western Magazine. He also was a regular in Sepia (a magazine patterned after Look and geared toward African-Americans) well into the 1980s.

In later years, Cheryl Cassidy, a friend of Winona Morris Nation, remembered Preece speaking often of "his 'glory days' when he was a passionate writer for 'subversive' publications and fighting with mighty words, for the end of racial prejudice and equal opportunity for all people."

=== Preece and Robert E. Howard ===
Harold Preece and Robert E. Howard were friends in their respective youths. They met through a mutual friend through involvement with Lone Scouts, a Boy Scouts program for youth in smaller and isolated communities. They also expressed literary ambitions in The Junto, a self-published literary magazine circulated among members of their small social group and initially edited by Preece.

When after Howard's death his fiction started to become a focus of scholarly interest, fans and scholars of his work resorted to Preece as an authority on the man. Science fiction author L. Sprague de Camp met and quizzed Preece on November 30, 1951, obtaining biographical material that went into the sketch of Howard in his Science-Fiction Handbook. Glenn Lord, later Howard's posthumous literary agent, also corresponded with Preece, and included contributions by him in The Howard Collector and the bio-bibliography The Last Celt. In the 1970s Preece wrote articles on Howard for Fantasy Crossroads and other fanzines. During this same period some of Winona Nation's poetry was published in Fantasy Crosswinds and Simba.

== Bibliography ==
- Lighting Up Liberia by Arthur I. Hayman and Harold Preece. Creative Age Press, Inc. New York, NY, 1943. Indictment of the settler/colonial state and plea for the United States to promote true democracy there.
- Dew on Jordan by Harold Preece and Celia Kraft. E. P. Dutton & Co., New York, NY, 1946. Anecdotal account of rural religious sects, including snake handlers, holy rollers, and rapturists.
- Living Pioneers by Harold Preece. The World Publishing Company, Cleveland and New York, 1952. Collection of stories by various narrators, edited and possibly in some instances rewritten by Preece; less sociopolitical commentary than in previous works aside for the "Good White Man" chapter, in which the narrator and editor share their visions of racial equality.
- Lone Star Man by Harold Preece. Hastings House Publishers, New York, NY, 1960. Biography of veteran Texas Ranger Ira Aten, written up by Preece from Aten's own notes and journals that Aten had written over the years.
- The Dalton Gang by Harold Preece. Hastings House Publishers, New York, NY, 1963. A complete survey of the lives and careers of the Dalton brothers and their gang, culminating in the double bank robbery in Coffeyville, Kansas.
