= Zora Neale Hurston =

American author, anthropologist, filmmaker (1891–1960)

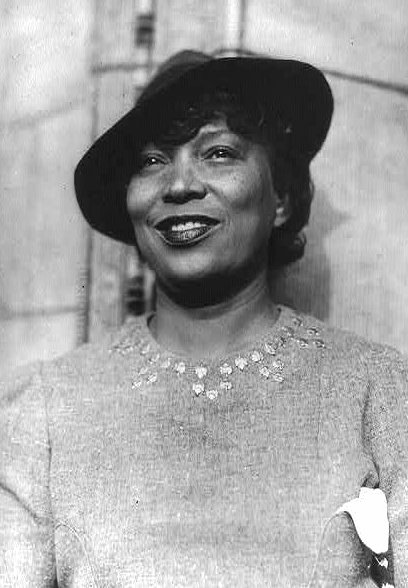
- Hurston sometime between 1935 and 1943
- Born: January 7, 1891; Notasulga, Alabama, U.S.
- Died: January 28, 1960 (aged 69); Fort Pierce, Florida, U.S.
- Education: Howard University; Barnard College (BA); Columbia University
- Occupations: Author; anthropologist; filmmaker
- Spouses: Herbert Sheen (m. 1927; div. 1931); Albert Price (m. 1939; div. 1943); James Howell Pitts (m. 1944; div. 1944)
- Writing career
- Period: c. 1925–1950
- Notable works: Mules and Men, Their Eyes Were Watching God
- Movement: The Harlem Renaissance

- Website: zoranealehurston.com

Zora Neale Hurston (January 7, 1891 – January 28, 1960) was an American writer, anthropologist, folklorist, and documentary filmmaker. She portrayed racial struggles in the early-20th-century American South and published research on Hoodoo and Caribbean Vodou. The most popular of her four novels is Their Eyes Were Watching God, published in 1937. She also wrote more than 50 short stories, plays, an autobiography, ethnographies, and many essays.

Some of her work, namely Tell My Horse (1937), explored ethnomusicological methods of study long before there were formal boundaries for the discipline, especially not boundaries that included the respectful study of communities of color. Hurston's unique background and exceptional approach to anthropology laid key foundations for the growth of ethnography, literature, and Africana Studies.

Hurston was born in Notasulga, Alabama, and moved with her family to Eatonville, Florida, in 1894. She later used Eatonville as the setting for many of her stories. In her early career, Hurston conducted anthropological and ethnographic research with anthropologist Franz Boas as a scholar at Barnard College and Columbia University. She had an interest in Black American and Caribbean folklore, and how these contributed to the community's identity.

She also wrote about contemporary issues in the Black community and became a central figure of the Harlem Renaissance. Her short satires, drawing from the African-American experience and racial division, were published in anthologies such as The New Negro and Fire!!. After moving back to Florida, Hurston wrote and published her literary anthology on African-American folklore in North Florida, Mules and Men (1935), and her first three novels: Jonah's Gourd Vine (1934); Their Eyes Were Watching God (1937); and Moses, Man of the Mountain (1939). Also published during this time was Tell My Horse: Voodoo and Life in Haiti and Jamaica (1938), documenting her research on rituals in Jamaica and Haiti.

Hurston's works concerned both the African-American experience and her struggles as an African-American woman. Her novels went relatively unrecognized by the literary world for decades. In 1975, fifteen years after Hurston's death, interest in her work was revived after author Alice Walker published an article, "In Search of Zora Neale Hurston" (later retitled "Looking for Zora"), in Ms. magazine.

In 2001, Hurston's manuscript Every Tongue Got to Confess, a collection of folktales gathered in the 1920s, was published after being discovered in the Smithsonian archives. Her nonfiction book Barracoon: The Story of the Last "Black Cargo" (2018), about the life of Cudjoe Lewis (Kossola), one of the last survivors of slaves brought illegally to the US in 1860, was also published posthumously.

== Early life ==
Zora Neale Hurston was born on January 7, 1891, the fifth of eight children of John Hurston and Lucy Ann Hurston (née Potts). All four of her grandparents had been born into slavery. Her father was a Baptist preacher and sharecropper, who later became a carpenter, and her mother was a school teacher. She was born in Notasulga, Alabama, her father's hometown, where her paternal grandfather was the preacher of a Baptist church.

When she was three, her family moved to Eatonville, Florida. In 1887, it was one of the first all-black towns incorporated in the United States. Hurston said that Eatonville was "home" to her, as she was so young when she moved there. Sometimes she claimed it as her birthplace. A few years later in 1897, her father was elected as mayor of the town. In 1902 he was called to serve as minister of its largest church, Macedonia Missionary Baptist.

In 1901, some northern school teachers visited Eatonville and gave Hurston several books that opened her mind to literature. She later described this personal literary awakening as a kind of "birth".

As an adult, Hurston often used Eatonville as a setting in her stories—it was a place where Black Americans could live as they desired, independent of white society. Hurston grew up in Eatonville and described the experience in her 1928 essay, "How It Feels To Be Colored Me". Eatonville now holds an annual "Zora! Festival" in her honor.

Hurston's mother died in 1904. Her father married Mattie Moge in 1905. This was considered scandalous, as it was rumored that he had had sexual relations with Moge before his first wife's death. Hurston's father and stepmother sent her to a Baptist boarding school in Jacksonville, Florida, but she was dismissed after her parents stopped paying her tuition.

== Pre-college ==
Before 1916, she worked periodically as a maid for white families. For some time she worked as a receptionist in a doctor's office and a few months after that worked as a live-in maid for her brother Bob.

In 1916, Hurston was employed as a maid by the lead singer of a touring Gilbert & Sullivan theatrical company.

In 1917, she resumed her formal education by attending night school at Morgan Academy, now known as Morgan State University, a historically black college in Baltimore, Maryland. At this time, to qualify for a free high-school education, the 26-year-old Hurston began claiming 1901 as her year of birth. She graduated from the high school in 1918.

== College and graduate studies ==
In college, Hurston learned how to view life through an anthropological lens apart from Eatonville. One of her main goals was to show similarities between ethnicities. In 1918, Hurston began her studies at Howard University, a historically black college in Washington, DC. She was a member of the Zeta Phi Beta Sorority. She was the first in her family to attend college. While at Howard, Hurston co-founded The Hilltop, the university's student newspaper. In 1921, she wrote a short story, "John Redding Goes to Sea", that qualified her to become a member of Alain Locke's literary club, The Stylus. She took courses in Spanish, English, Greek, and public speaking, and earned an associate degree in 1920. Hurston paid for school by working as a manicurist in the evenings.

In 1925 Hurston was offered a scholarship by Barnard trustee Annie Nathan Meyer to attend Barnard College of Columbia University. She was the first African-American admitted to this women's college.

Hurston assisted Meyer in crafting the play Black Souls; which is considered one of the first "lynching dramas" written by a white woman. She conducted ethnographic research with anthropologist Franz Boas of Columbia University and later studied with him as a graduate student. She also worked with Ruth Benedict and fellow anthropology student Margaret Mead. Hurston received her B.A. in anthropology in 1928.

Documentary footage from Hurston's travels in the South

Alain Locke recommended Hurston to Charlotte Osgood Mason, a philanthropist and literary patron who had supported Locke and other African-American authors, such as Langston Hughes; however, she also tried to direct their work. Mason became interested in Hurston's work and supported her travel in the South for research from 1927 to 1932 with a stipend of $200 per month. In return, she wanted Hurston to give her all the material she collected about African-American music, folklore, literature, hoodoo, and other forms of culture. Hurston's 1927–1932 travel in the South was also backed by the Association for the Study of Negro Life (now known as the Association for the Study of African American Life and History) and the American Folklore Society, which awarded her grants totaling $1,400.

At the same time, Hurston needed to satisfy Boas as her academic adviser. Boas was a cultural relativist who wanted to overturn ideas about ranking cultures in a hierarchy of values.

After graduating from Barnard in February 1928, Hurston spent two years as a graduate student in anthropology, working with Boas at Columbia University. Living in Harlem in the 1920s, Hurston befriended writers including Langston Hughes and Countee Cullen. Her apartment, according to some accounts, was a popular spot for social gatherings. Around this time, Hurston had a few literary successes, placing in short-story and playwriting contests in Opportunity: A Journal of Negro Life, published by the National Urban League.

== Patronage and support ==
When foundation grants ended during the Great Depression, Hurston and her friend Langston Hughes both relied on the patronage of philanthropist Charlotte Osgood Mason, a white literary patron. During the 1930s, Hurston was a resident of Westfield, New Jersey, a suburb of New York, where her friend Hughes was among her neighbors.

== Academic appointments ==
In 1934, Hurston established a school of dramatic arts "based on pure Negro expression" at Bethune-Cookman College, a historically black college in Daytona Beach, Florida later to be known as Bethune-Cookman University. In 1956, Hurston received the Bethune-Cookman College Award for Education and Human Relations in recognition of her achievements. The English Department at Bethune-Cookman College remains dedicated to preserving her cultural legacy.

For the 1939–1940 academic year, Hurston joined the drama department at the North Carolina College for Negroes (NCC) in Durham. At the beginning of her tenure, Hurston published Moses, Man of the Mountain.

During her time in the Durham area, Hurston primarily participated in a variety of theater activities, marking her lasting interest in Black folkloric theater and drama. On October 7, 1939, Hurston addressed the Carolina Dramatic Association, remarking that "our drama must be like us or it doesn't exist... I want to build the drama of North Carolina out of ourselves." She noted that her students were largely supportive of this endeavor because many of the plays performed and viewed by them previously were not relatable to their own experiences and instead prioritized a "highbrow" view of society.

She taught various courses at NCC, but she also studied informally at the University of North Carolina at Chapel Hill with Pulitzer Prize-winning playwright Paul Green. She was also mentored by Frederick H. Koch, another faculty member at UNC and the founder of the Carolina Playmakers. She initially met both writers at the inaugural 1934 National Folk Festival in St. Louis, Missouri. She was persuaded by them to move to North Carolina for the prospect of collaboration with UNC faculty and students, despite the fact that UNC was still segregated and did not begin formally admitting Black students until 1951. Because her formal participation was limited, Hurston became a "secret student", participating in coursework and theater groups without enrolling at UNC. The Daily Tar Heel, the UNC student newspaper, even named Hurston as a student in one such course, which focused on radio production.

Hurston left NCC after one year to pursue a new fieldwork project in South Carolina. It is likely that her departure was partially due to her poor relationship with NCC's president, James E. Shepard, to which she briefly alluded in her 1942 autobiography, Dust Tracks on a Road. To Shepard, Hurston's attire and lifestyle choices were inappropriate for an unmarried woman, leading to many disagreements; her severance was rumored to be "the only thing that [they] could apparently agree upon."

In 2015, UNC students called for Saunders Hall (named after Ku Klux Klan leader William L. Saunders) to be renamed "Hurston Hall" in recognition of Hurston's contributions to academic life in the Durham-Chapel Hill area. UNC Trustees controversially voted to name the building Carolina Hall instead, but it is still known informally by many students as Hurston Hall. Despite the brief nature of her residency in North Carolina, Hurston is still honored at a variety of events in the area, including readings of her work.

== Anthropological and folkloric fieldwork ==
Hurston traveled extensively in the Caribbean and the American South and immersed herself in local cultural practices to conduct her anthropological research. Based on her work in the South, sponsored from 1928 to 1932 by Charlotte Osgood Mason, a wealthy philanthropist, Hurston wrote Mules and Men in 1935. She was researching lumber camps in north Florida and commented on the practice of white men in power taking black women as concubines, including having them bear children. This practice later was referred to as "paramour rights", based on the men's power under racial segregation and related to practices during slavery times. The book also includes much folklore. Hurston drew from this material in writing novels such as Jonah's Gourd Vine (1934).

In 1935, Hurston traveled to Georgia and Florida with Alan Lomax and Mary Elizabeth Barnicle for research on African-American song traditions and their relationship to slave and African antecedent music. She was tasked with selecting the geographic areas and contacting the research subjects.

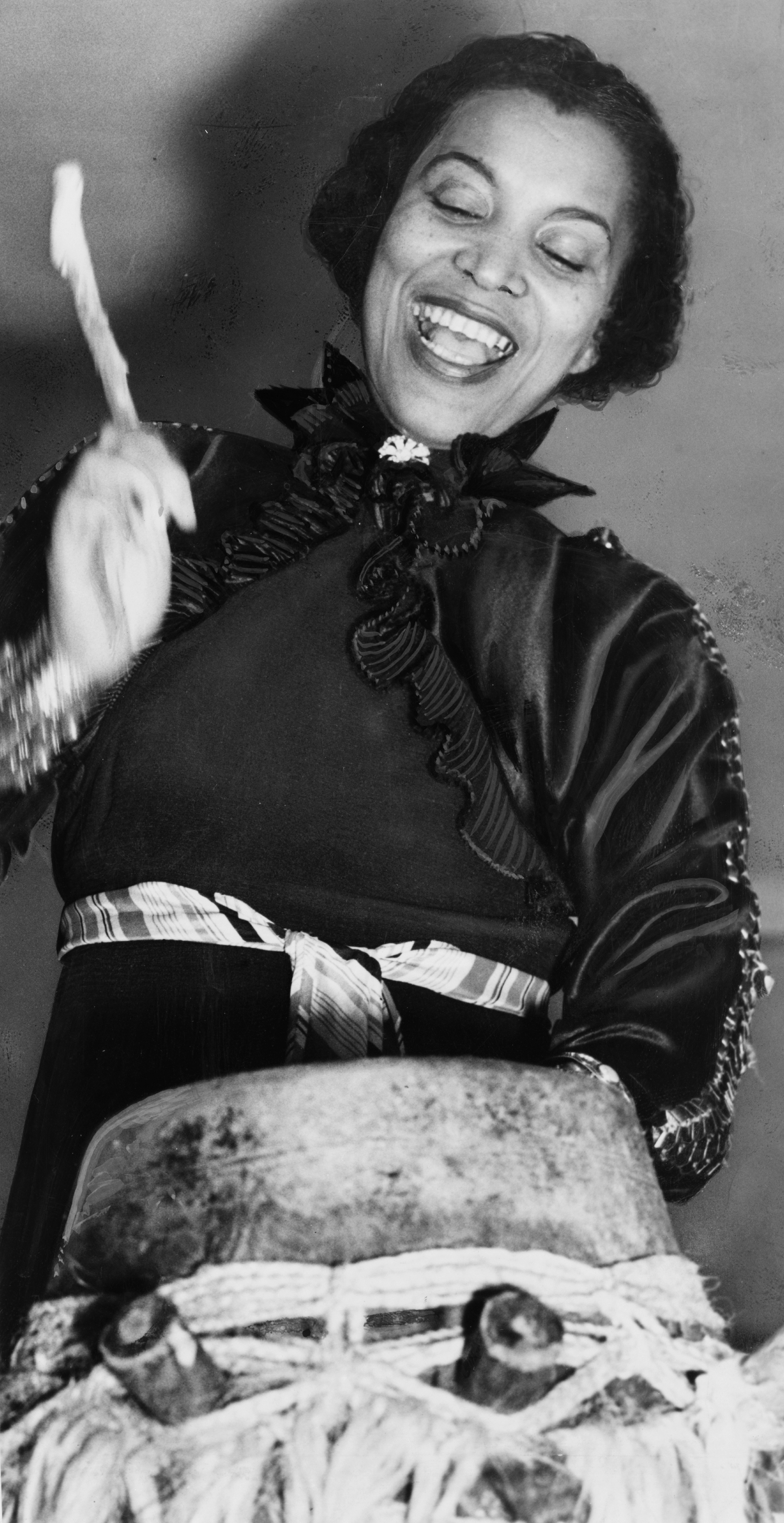
Hurston playing a hountar, or mama drum, 1937

In 1936 and 1937, Hurston traveled to Jamaica and Haiti for research, with support from the Guggenheim Foundation. She drew from this research for Tell My Horse (1938), a genre-defying book that mixes anthropology, folklore, and personal narrative. In the fourth chapter of this book, titled "Night Song After Death", Hurston recounts the time she visited St. Thomas, Jamaica, where she observed and participated in the ritual of the "Nine Night". This chapter illustrates how Hurston's method of fieldwork was not overly analytical or quantitative, as she primarily aimed at capturing the experiences and perspectives of the Jamaican people, while also encapsulating the atmosphere and spiritual fervor that surrounded the ritual. Although Hurston's more qualitative work lacks the technicalities used in quantitative ethnographic work, such as a thorough analysis describing the form or tonalities of the music played during the "Nine Night", it provides advantages that quantitative research cannot offer: Hurston's qualitative ethnographic fieldwork has the ability to convey how the social interactions (e.g., through dance), stories and beliefs/superstitions (e.g., the ever-changing stories interviewees told her, concerning the "duppy" or spirit), and the culture's use of music, are used to celebrate the life and afterlife of the recently deceased.

In 1938 and 1939, Hurston worked for the Federal Writers' Project (FWP), part of the Works Progress Administration. Hired for her experience as a writer and folklorist, she gathered information to add to Florida's historical and cultural collection. Music makes up a significant portion of the material she collected for the FWP, including: “Crow Dance,” a Bahamian-American dance song with West African roots; the Gullah Geechee song, “Oh, the Buford Boat Done Come”; and the folk song “John Henry,” performed by Gabriel Brown.

From May 1947 to February 1948, Hurston lived in Honduras, in the north coastal town of Puerto Cortés. She had some hopes of locating either Mayan ruins or vestiges of an undiscovered civilization. While in Puerto Cortés, she wrote much of Seraph on the Suwanee, set in Florida. Hurston expressed interest in the polyethnic nature of the population in the region (many, such as the Miskito Zambu and Garifuna, were of mixed African and indigenous ancestry and had developed creole cultures).

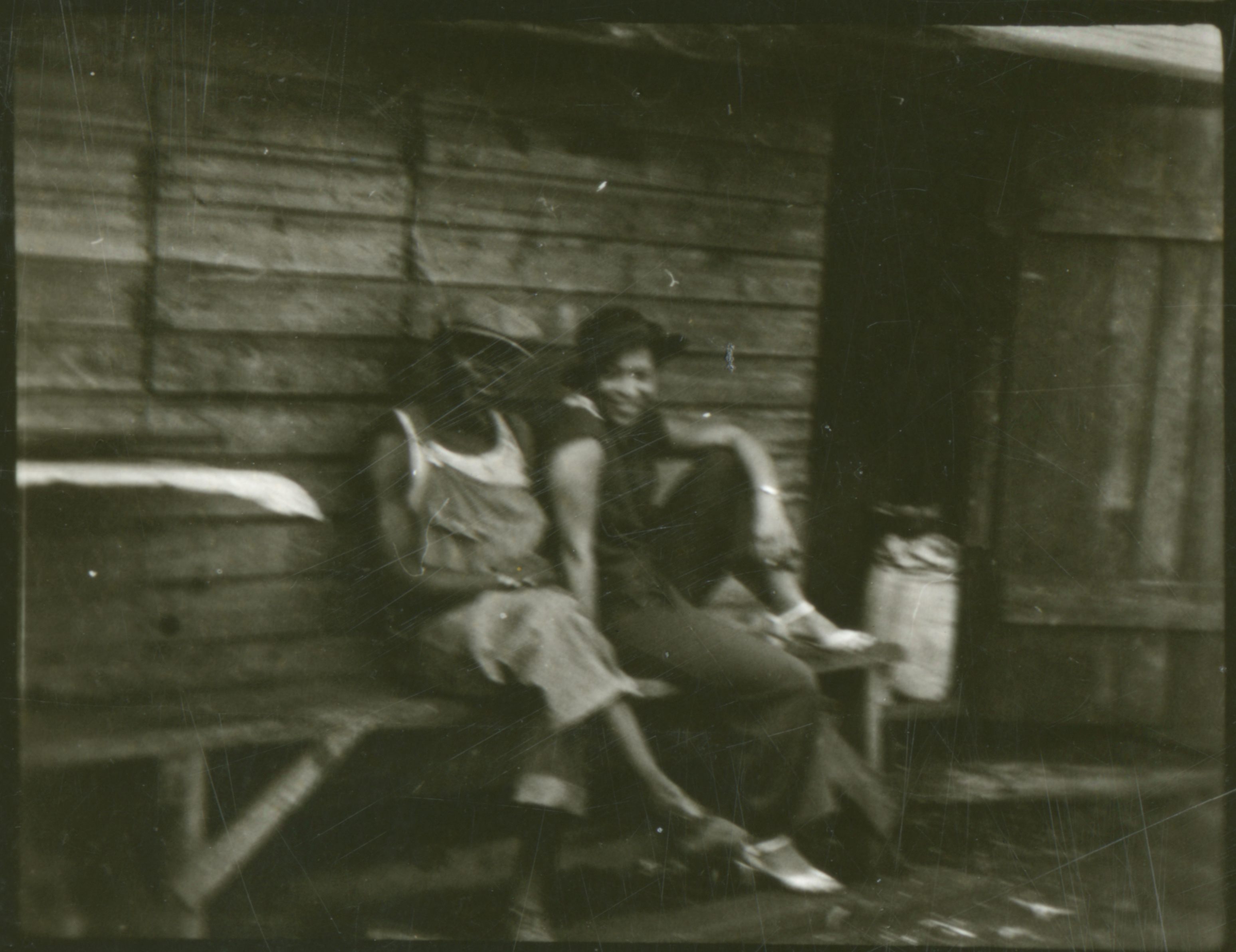
Hurston in Florida on an anthropological research trip, 1935

Some authors criticized Hurston for her sensationalist representation of voodoo. In The Crisis magazine in 1943, Harold Preece criticized Hurston for her perpetuation of "Negro primitivism" in order to advance her own literary career. The Journal of Negro History complained that her work on voodoo was an indictment of African-American ignorance and superstition.

Jeffrey Anderson states that Hurston's research methods were questionable and that she fabricated material for her works on voodoo. He observed that she admitted to inventing dialogue for her book Mules and Men in a letter to Ruth Benedict and described fabricating the Mules and Men story of rival voodoo doctors as a child in her later autobiography. Anderson believes that many of Hurston's other claims in her voodoo writings are dubious as well.

Several authors have contended that Hurston engaged in significant plagiarism, and her biographer Robert Hemenway argues that the article "Cudjo's Own Story of the Last African Slaver" (1927) was approximately 25% original, the rest being plagiarized from Emma Langdon Roche's Historic Sketches of the Old South. Hemenway does not claim that this undermines the validity of her later fieldwork: he states that Hurston "never plagiarized again; she became a major folklore collector".

== Literary career ==
When Hurston arrived in New York City in 1925, the Harlem Renaissance was at its zenith, and she soon became one of the writers at its center. Shortly before she entered Barnard, Hurston's short story "Spunk" was selected for The New Negro, a landmark anthology of fiction, poetry, and essays focusing on African and African-American art and literature. In 1926, a group of young black writers including Hurston, Langston Hughes, and Wallace Thurman, calling themselves the Niggerati, produced a literary magazine called Fire!! that featured many of the young artists and writers of the Harlem Renaissance.

In 1927, Hurston traveled to the Deep South to collect African-American folk tales. She also interviewed Cudjoe Kazzola Lewis, of Africatown, Alabama, who was the last known survivor of the enslaved Africans carried aboard Clotilda, an illegal slave ship that had entered the US in 1860, and thus the last known person to have been transported in the Transatlantic slave trade. The next year she published the article "Cudjoe's Own Story of the Last African Slaver" (1928). According to her biographer Robert E. Hemenway, this piece largely plagiarized the work of Emma Langdon Roche, an Alabama writer who wrote about Lewis in a 1914 book. Hurston did add new information about daily life in Lewis' home village of Bantè.

Hurston intended to publish a collection of several hundred folk tales from her field studies in the South. She wanted to have them be as close to the original as possible but struggled to balance the expectations of her academic adviser, Franz Boas, and her patron, Charlotte Osgood Mason. This manuscript was not published at the time. A copy was later found at the Smithsonian archives among the papers of anthropologist William Duncan Strong, a friend of Boas. Hurston's Negro Folk-tales from the Gulf States was published posthumously in 2001 as Every Tongue Got to Confess.

In 1928, Hurston returned to Alabama with additional resources; she conducted more interviews with Lewis, took photographs of him and others in the community, and recorded the only known film footage of him—an African who had been trafficked to the United States through the slave trade. Based on this material, she wrote a manuscript, Barracoon, completing it in 1931. Hemenway described it as "a highly dramatic, semifictionalized narrative intended for the popular reader." It has also been described as a "testimonial text", more in the style of other anthropological studies since the late 20th century.

After this round of interviews, Hurston's literary patron, philanthropist Charlotte Osgood Mason, learned of Lewis and began to send him money for his support. Lewis was also interviewed by journalists for local and national publications. Hurston's manuscript Barracoon was eventually published posthumously on May 8, 2018. "Barracoon", or barracks in Spanish, is where captured Africans were temporarily imprisoned before being shipped abroad.

In 1929, Hurston moved to Eau Gallie, Florida, where she wrote Mules and Men. It was published in 1935.

=== 1930s ===
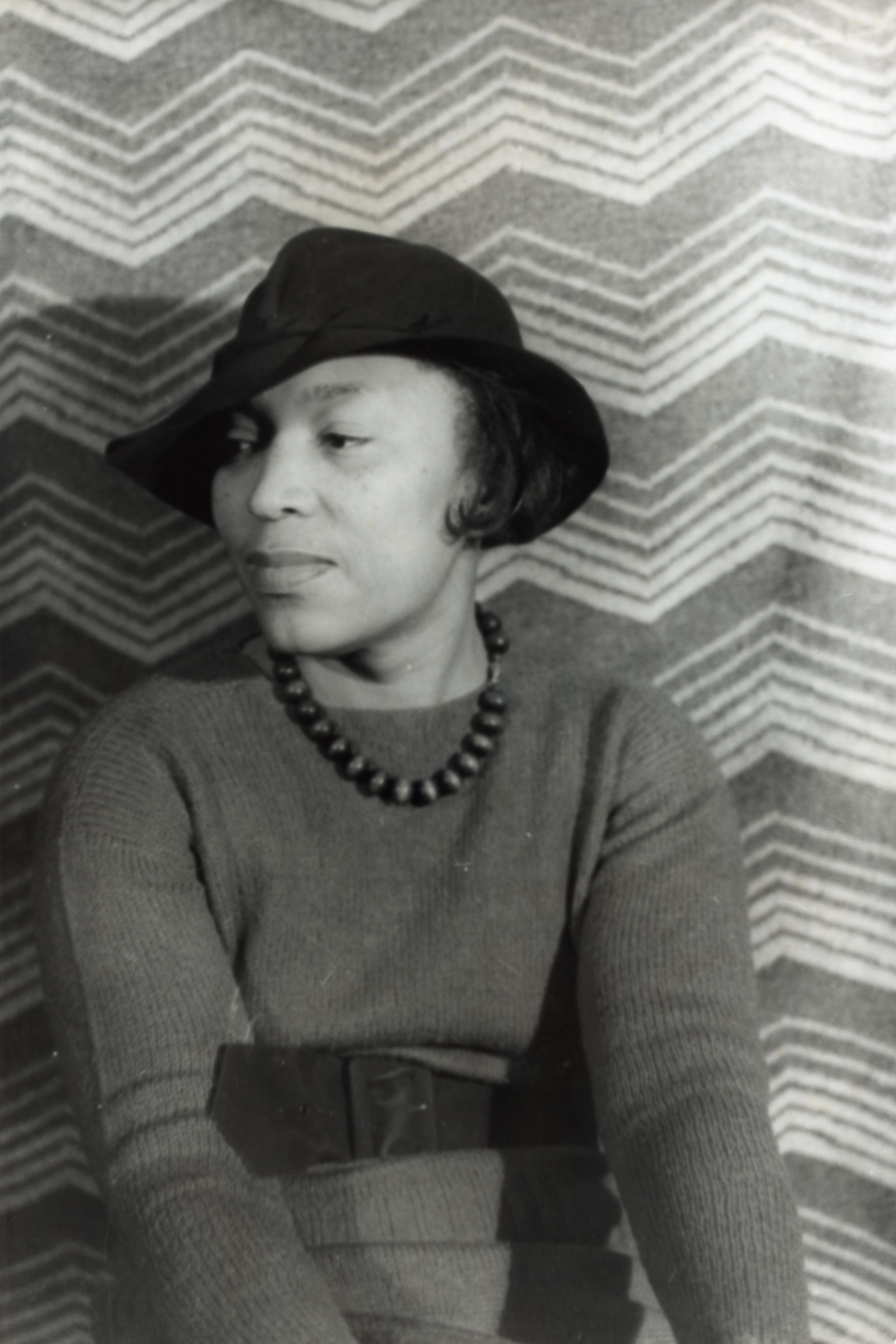
Neale Hurston in 1938, photographed by Carl Van Vechten

By the mid-1930s, Hurston had published several short stories and the critically acclaimed Mules and Men (1935), a groundbreaking work of "literary anthropology" documenting African-American folklore from timber camps in North Florida. To her collection of folktales, she added the quip "Now you are going to hear lies above suspicion". In 1930, she collaborated with Langston Hughes on Mule Bone: A Comedy of Negro Life, a play that they never staged. Their collaboration caused their friendship to fall apart. The play was first staged in 1991.

Hurston adapted her anthropological work for the performing arts. Her folk revue The Great Day featured authentic African song and dance, and premiered at the John Golden Theatre in New York in January 1932. Despite positive reviews, it had only one performance. The Broadway debut left Hurston in $600 worth of debt. No producers wanted to move forward with a full run of the show.

During the 1930s, Zora Neale Hurston produced two more musical revues, From Sun to Sun, which was a revised adaptation of The Great Day, and Singing Steel. Hurston had a strong belief that folklore should be dramatized.

Hurston's first three novels were published in the 1930s: Jonah's Gourd Vine (1934); Their Eyes Were Watching God (1937), written during her fieldwork in Haiti and considered her masterwork; and Moses, Man of the Mountain (1939).

In 1937, Hurston was awarded a Guggenheim Fellowship to conduct ethnographic research in Jamaica and Haiti. Tell My Horse (1938) documents her account of her fieldwork studying spiritual and cultural rituals in Jamaica and vodoun in Haiti.

=== 1940s and 1950s ===
In the 1940s, Hurston's work was published in such periodicals as The American Mercury and The Saturday Evening Post. Her last published novel, Seraph on the Suwanee, notable principally for its focus on white characters, was published in 1948. It explores images of "white trash" women. Jackson (2000) argues that Hurston's meditation on abjection, waste, and the construction of class and gender identities among poor whites reflects the eugenics discourses of the 1920s.

In 1948, Hurston was accused of child sexual abuse by her landlord's son. She was able to clear her name by showing that she had been in Honduras on the date that the abuse supposedly occurred, and charges were ultimately dropped. However, Hurston was devastated by the incident, which nearly destroyed her reputation.

During her last decade, Hurston worked as a freelance writer for magazines and newspapers. In the fall of 1952, she was contacted by Sam Nunn, editor of the Pittsburgh Courier, to go to Florida to cover the murder trial of Ruby McCollum. McCollum was charged with murdering the white Dr. C. Leroy Adams, who was also a state politician. McCollum said he had forced her to have sex and bear his child. Hurston recalled what she had seen of white male sexual dominance in the lumber camps in North Florida, and discussed it with Nunn. They both thought the case might be about such "paramour rights", and wanted to "expose it to a national audience".

Upon reaching Live Oak, Hurston was surprised not only by the gag order the judge in the trial placed on the defense but by her inability to get residents in town to talk about the case; both blacks and whites were silent. She believed that might have been related to Dr. Adams' alleged involvement in the gambling operation of Ruby's husband Sam McCollum. Her articles were published by the newspaper during the trial. Ruby McCollum was convicted by an all-male, all-white jury, and sentenced to death. Hurston had a special assignment to write a serialized account, The Life Story of Ruby McCollum, over three months in 1953 in the newspaper. Her part was ended abruptly when she and Nunn disagreed about her pay, and she left.

Unable to pay independently to return for the appeal and second trial, Hurston contacted journalist William Bradford Huie, with whom she had worked at The American Mercury, to try to interest him in the case. He covered the appeal and second trial, and also developed material from a background investigation. Hurston shared her material with him from the first trial, but he acknowledged her only briefly in his book, Ruby McCollum: Woman in the Suwannee Jail (1956), which became a bestseller.

Hurston celebrated that

"McCollum's testimony in her own defense marked the first time that a woman of African-American descent was allowed to testify as to the paternity of her child by a white man. Hurston firmly believed that Ruby McCollum's testimony sounded the death toll of 'paramour rights' in the Segregationist South."

Among other positions, Hurston later worked at the Pan American World Airways Technical Library at Patrick Air Force Base in 1956. She was fired in 1957 for being "too well-educated" for her job.

She moved to Fort Pierce, Florida. Taking jobs where she could find them, Hurston worked occasionally as a substitute teacher. At age 60, Hurston had to fight "to make ends meet" with the help of public assistance. At one point she worked as a maid on Miami Beach's Rivo Alto Island.

== Personal life ==
In 1927, Hurston married Herbert Sheen, a jazz musician and a former teacher at Howard. He later went to medical school and became a physician. Their marriage ended in 1931. In 1935, Hurston was involved with Percy Punter, a graduate student at Columbia University. He inspired the character of Tea Cake in Their Eyes Were Watching God. In 1939, while Hurston was working for the WPA in Florida, she married Albert Price. They separated after a few months, but did not divorce until 1943. The following year, Hurston married James Howell Pitts of Cleveland. That marriage, too, lasted less than a year.

== Death and legacy ==
During a period of financial and medical difficulties, Hurston was forced to enter St. Lucie County Welfare Home, where she had a stroke. She died of hypertensive heart disease on January 28, 1960, and was buried at the Garden of Heavenly Rest in Fort Pierce, Florida. Her remains were in an unmarked grave until 1973.

Novelist Alice Walker and fellow Hurston scholar Charlotte D. Hunt found an unmarked grave in 1973 in the general area where Hurston had been buried; they decided to mark it as hers. Walker commissioned a gray marker inscribed with "ZORA NEALE HURSTON / A GENIUS OF THE SOUTH / NOVELIST FOLKLORIST / ANTHROPOLOGIST / 1901–1960." The line "a genius of the south" is from Jean Toomer's poem, "Georgia Dusk", which appears in his book Cane. Hurston was born in 1891, not 1901.

After Hurston's death, a yardman, who had been told to clean the house, was burning Hurston's papers and belongings. A law officer and friend, Patrick DuVal, passing by the house where she had lived, stopped and put out the fire, thus saving an invaluable collection of literary documents. For two years, he stored them on his covered porch until he and a group of Hurston's friends could find an archive to take the material. The nucleus of this collection was given to the University of Florida libraries in 1961 by Mrs. Marjorie Silver, a friend, and neighbor of Hurston. Within the collection is a manuscript and photograph of Seraph on the Suwanee and an unpublished biography of Herod the Great. Luckily, she donated some of her manuscripts to the James Weldon Johnson Collection of Yale University. Other materials were donated in 1970 and 1971 by Frances Grover, daughter of E. O. Grover, a Rollins College professor and long-time friend of Hurston. In 1979, Stetson Kennedy of Jacksonville, who knew Hurston through his work with the Federal Writers' Project, added additional papers. (Zora Neale Hurston Papers, University of Florida Smathers Libraries, August 2008).

=== Public obscurity ===
Hurston's work slid into obscurity for decades, for both cultural and political reasons. The use of African-American dialect, as featured in Hurston's novels, became less popular. Younger writers felt that it was demeaning to use such dialect, given the racially charged history of dialect fiction in American literature. Also, Hurston had made stylistic choices in dialogue influenced by her academic studies. Thinking like a folklorist, Hurston strove to represent speech patterns of the period, which she had documented through ethnographic research.

Several of Hurston's literary contemporaries criticized her use of dialect, saying that it was a caricature of African-American culture and was rooted in a post-Civil War, white racist tradition. These writers, associated with the Harlem Renaissance, criticized Hurston's later work as not advancing the movement. Richard Wright, in his review of Their Eyes Were Watching God, said:

The sensory sweep of her novel carries no theme, no message, no thought. In the main, her novel is not addressed to the Negro, but to a white audience whose chauvinistic tastes she knows how to satisfy. She exploits that phase of Negro life which is "quaint," the phase which evokes a piteous smile on the lips of the "superior" race.

But since the late 20th century, there has been a revival of interest in Hurston. Critics have since praised her skillful use of idiomatic speech. Alice Walker published "In Search of Zora Neale Hurston" in the March 1975 issue of Ms. magazine, reviving interest in Hurston's work.

During the 1930s and 1940s, when her work was published, the pre-eminent African-American author was Richard Wright, a former Communist. Unlike Hurston, Wright wrote in explicitly political terms. He had become disenchanted with Communism, but he used the struggle of African-Americans for respect and economic advancement as both the setting and the motivation for his work. Other popular African-American authors of the time, such as Ralph Ellison, dealt with the same concerns as Wright albeit in ways more influenced by Modernism.

Hurston, who at times evinced conservative attitudes, was on the other side of the disputes over the promise of leftist politics for African Americans. In 1951, for example, Hurston argued that New Deal economic support had created a harmful dependency by African-Americans on the government and that this dependency ceded too much power to politicians.

Despite increasing difficulties, Hurston maintained her independence and a determined optimism. She wrote in a 1957 letter:

But ... I have made phenomenal growth as a creative artist. ... I am not materialistic ... If I do happen to die without money, somebody will bury me, though I do not wish it to be that way.

=== Posthumous publications ===
Hurston's manuscript Every Tongue Got to Confess (2001), a collection of folktales gathered in the 1920s, was published posthumously after being discovered in Smithsonian archives. In 2008, The Library of America selected excerpts from Ruby McCollum: Woman in the Suwannee Jail (1956), to which Hurston had contributed, for inclusion in its two-century retrospective of American true crime writing. Hurston's nonfiction book Barracoon was published in 2018. In February 2022, a collection of Hurston's non-fiction writings titled You Don't Know Us Negroes and Other Essays, edited by Henry Louis Gates Jr, and Genevieve West, was published by HarperCollins. On January 7, 2025, to coincide with Hurston's birthday, her unfinished novel The Life of Herod the Great was published by HarperCollins.

=== Posthumous recognition ===
- Zora Neale Hurston's hometown of Eatonville, Florida, celebrates her life annually in the Zora Neale Hurston Festival of the Arts and Humanities. It is home to the Zora Neale Hurston Museum of Fine Arts, and a library named for her opened in January 2004.
- The Zora Neale Hurston House in Fort Pierce has been designated as a National Historic Landmark. The city celebrates Hurston annually through various events such as Hattitudes, birthday parties, and the several-day event at the end of April known as Zora! Festival.
- In 1991, Mule Bone: A Comedy of Negro Life, a 1930 play by Langston Hughes and Hurston, was first staged; it was staged in New York City by the Lincoln Center Theater.
- In 1994, Hurston was inducted into the National Women's Hall of Fame.
- The Zora Neale Hurston Award was established in 2008; it is awarded to an American Library Association member who has "demonstrated leadership in promoting African American literature".
- Hurston was inducted as a member of the inaugural class of the New York Writers Hall of Fame in 2010.
- The novel Harlem Mosaics (2012) by Whit Frazier depicts the friendship between Langston Hughes and Hurston and tells the story of how their friendship fell apart during their collaboration on the 1930 play Mule Bone: A Comedy of Negro Life.
- On January 7, 2014, the 123rd anniversary of Hurston's birthday was commemorated by a Google Doodle.
- She was one of twelve inaugural inductees to the Alabama Writers Hall of Fame on June 8, 2015.

== Political views ==
Hurston was a Republican and a supporter of Booker T. Washington. According to John McWhorter, writing in City Journal, although she stated her support for the "complete repeal of All Jim Crow Laws", she was a contrarian on civil rights activism and generally lacked interest in being associated with it. In 1951, she criticized the New Deal, arguing that it had created a harmful dependency on the government among African Americans.

She criticized communism in her 1951 essay titled Why the Negro won't Buy Communism, accusing communists of exploiting African Americans for their own personal gain. In her 1938 review of Richard Wright's short-story collection Uncle Tom's Children, she criticized his communist beliefs and the Communist Party USA for supporting "state responsibility for everything and individual responsibility for nothing, not even feeding one's self". Her views on communism, the New Deal, and other topics contrasted with the views of many of her colleagues during the Harlem Renaissance, such as Langston Hughes, who was a supporter of the Soviet Union and praised it in several of his poems during the 1930s.

John McWhorter has called Hurston a conservative, stating that she is "America's favorite black conservative". David T. Beito and Linda Royster Beito have argued that she can be characterized as a libertarian, comparing her to Rose Wilder Lane and Isabel Paterson, two female libertarian novelists who were her contemporaries and are known as the "founding mothers" of American libertarianism. Russell A. Berman of the Hoover Institution described her as a "heterodox and staunchly libertarian thinker". The libertarian magazine Reason praised her, arguing: "What Hurston wanted, in both life and literature, was for everyone, of every race, for better or worse, to be viewed as an individual first."

In response to black writers who criticized her novel Their Eyes Were Watching God because it did not explore racial themes, she stated: "I am not interested in the race problem, but I am interested in the problems of individuals, white ones and black ones". She criticized what she described as "Race Pride and Race Consciousness", describing it as a "thing to be abhorred", stating:

Suppose a Negro does something really magnificent, and I glory, not in the benefit to mankind, but in the fact that the doer was a Negro. Must I not also go hang my head in shame when a member of my race does something execrable? The white race did not go into a laboratory and invent incandescent light. That was Edison. If you are under the impression that every white man is an Edison, just look around a bit. If you have the idea that every Negro is a Carver, you had better take off plenty of time to do your searching.

In 1952, Hurston supported the presidential campaign of Senator Robert A. Taft. Like Taft, Hurston was against Franklin D. Roosevelt's New Deal policies. She also shared his opposition to Roosevelt and Truman's interventionist foreign policy. In the original draft of her autobiography, Dust Tracks on a Road, Hurston compared the United States government to a "fence" in stolen goods and a Mafia-like protection racket. Hurston thought it ironic that the same "people who claim that it is a noble thing to die for freedom and democracy...wax frothy if anyone points out the inconsistency of their morals...We, too, consider machine gun bullets good laxatives for heathens who get constipated with toxic ideas about a country of their own." She was scathing about those who sought "freedoms" for those abroad but denied it to people in their home countries: Roosevelt "can call names across an ocean" for his Four Freedoms, but he did not have "the courage to speak even softly at home." When Truman dropped the atomic bombs on Japan she called him "the Butcher of Asia".

Hurston opposed the Supreme Court ruling in the Brown v. Board of Education case of 1954. She felt that if separate schools were truly equal (and she believed that they were rapidly becoming so), educating black students in physical proximity to white students would not result in better education. Also, she worried about the demise of black schools and black teachers as a way to pass on cultural traditions to future generations of African Americans. She voiced this opposition in a letter, "Court Order Can't Make Races Mix", that was published in the Orlando Sentinel in August 1955. Hurston wrote, "The whole matter revolves around the self-respect of my people. How much satisfaction can I get from a court order for somebody to associate with me who does not wish me near them?" According to McWhorter, Hurston also opposed preferential treatment for African Americans, saying:

If I say a whole system must be upset for me to win, I am saying that I cannot sit in the game and that safer rules must be made to give me a chance. I repudiate that. If others are in there, deal me a hand and let me see what I can make of it, even though I know some in there are dealing from the bottom and cheating like hell in other ways.

Hurston appeared to oppose integration based on pride and her sense of independence. She would not "bow low before the white man", and claimed "adequate Negro schools" already existed in 1955. Hurston is described as a "trailblazer for black women's empowerment" because of her numerous individual achievements and her strong belief that black women could be "self-made". However, a common criticism of her work is that the vagueness of her racial politics in her writing, particularly about black feminism, makes her "a prime candidate for white intellectual idolatry." Darwin T. Turner, an English professor and specialist in African-American literature, faulted Hurston in 1971 for opposing integration and for opposing programs to guarantee blacks the right to work.

=== Spiritual views ===
In Chapter XV of Dust Tracks on a Road, entitled "Religion", Hurston expressed disbelief in and disdain for both theism and religious belief. She states:

Prayer seems to me a cry of weakness, and an attempt to avoid, by trickery, the rules of the game as laid down. I do not choose to admit weakness. I accept the challenge of responsibility. Life, as it is, does not frighten me, since I have made my peace with the universe as I find it, and bow to its laws.

However, although she firmly rejected the Baptist beliefs of her preacher father, she retained an interest in religion from anthropological and literary standpoints. She investigated voodoo, going so far as to participate in rituals alongside her research subjects. Another of her original uncensored notes for her autobiography shares her admiration for Biblical characters like King David: "He was a man after God's own heart, and was quite serviceable in helping God get rid of no-count rascals who were cluttering up the place."

== In fiction ==
In 2017, comics creator Peter Bagge published a graphic novel based on her life and works titled Fire!!: the Zora Neale Hurston Story. It was reviewed positively by NPR and other media outlets.

== In film, television, and radio ==
- In 1935 and 1936, Zora Neale Hurston shot documentary footage as part of her fieldwork in Florida and Haiti. Included are rare ethnographic evidence of the Hoodoo and Vodou religion in the U.S. and Haiti.
- Some footage claimed to be by Hurston from 1928 is accessible from the Internet Archive.
- In 1989, PBS aired a drama based on Hurston's life entitled Zora is My Name!.
- The 1992–95 PBS children's television series Ghostwriter, which had an emphasis on reading and writing skills, featured the lead characters attending the fictitious Zora Neale Hurston Middle School in the Fort Greene neighborhood of Brooklyn, New York.
- The 2004 film Brother to Brother, set in part during the Harlem Renaissance, featured Hurston (portrayed by Aunjanue Ellis).
- Their Eyes Were Watching God was adapted for a 2005 film of the same title by Oprah Winfrey's Harpo Productions, with a teleplay by Suzan-Lori Parks. The film starred Halle Berry as Janie Starks.
- On April 9, 2008, PBS broadcast a 90-minute documentary, Zora Neale Hurston: Jump at the Sun, written and produced by filmmaker Kristy Andersen, as part of the American Masters series.
- In 2009, Hurston was featured in a 90-minute documentary about the WPA Writers' Project titled Soul of a People: Writing America's Story, which premiered on the Smithsonian Channel. Her work in Florida during the 1930s is highlighted in the companion book, Soul of a People: The WPA Writers' Project Uncovers Depression America.
- An excerpt from her autobiography Dust Tracks on a Road was recited in the documentary film August 28: A Day in the Life of a People, directed by Ava DuVernay, which debuted at the opening of the Smithsonian's National Museum of African American History and Culture in 2016.
- In 2017, Jackie Kay presented a 30-minute BBC Radio 4 documentary about Hurston called A Woman Half in Shadow, first broadcast on April 17, and subsequently available as a podcast.
- TLC's Rozonda Thomas plays Hurston in the 2017 film Marshall.
- In January 2017, the documentary "Zora Neale Hurston: Claiming a Space" premiered on PBS.

== Selected works ==
- "Journey's End" (Negro World, 1922), poetry
- "Night" (Negro World, 1922), poetry
- "Passion" (Negro World, 1922), poetry
- Color Struck (Opportunity: A Journal of Negro Life, 1925), play
- Muttsy (Opportunity: A Journal of Negro Life) 1926, short story.
- "Sweat" (1926), short story
- "How It Feels to Be Colored Me" (1928), essay
- "Hoodoo in America" (1931) in The Journal of American Folklore
- "The Gilded Six-Bits" (1933), short story
- Jonah's Gourd Vine (1934), novel
- Mules and Men (1935), non-fiction
- Their Eyes Were Watching God (1937), novel
- Tell My Horse (1938), non-fiction
- Moses, Man of the Mountain (1939), novel
- Dust Tracks on a Road (1942), autobiography
- Seraph on the Suwanee (1948), novel
- "What White Publishers Won't Print" (Negro Digest, 1950)
- I Love Myself When I Am Laughing... and Then Again When I Am Looking Mean and Impressive: A Zora Neale Hurston Reader (Alice Walker, ed.; 1979)
- The Sanctified Church (1981)
- Spunk: Selected Stories (1985)
- Mule Bone: A Comedy of Negro Life (play, with Langston Hughes; edited with introductions by George Houston Bass and Henry Louis Gates Jr.; 1991)
- The Complete Stories (introduction by Henry Louis Gates Jr. and Sieglinde Lemke; 1995)
- Novels & Stories: Jonah's Gourd Vine, Their Eyes Were Watching God, Moses, Man of the Mountain, Seraph on the Suwanee, Selected Stories (Cheryl A. Wall, ed.; Library of America, 1995) ISBN 978-0-940450-83-7
- Folklore, Memoirs, & Other Writings: Mules and Men, Tell My Horse, Dust Tracks on a Road, Selected Articles (Cheryl A. Wall, ed.; Library of America, 1995) ISBN 978-0-940450-84-4
- Every Tongue Got to Confess: Negro Folk-tales from the Gulf States (2001)
- Zora Neale Hurston: A Life in Letters, collected and edited by Carla Kaplan (2003)
- Collected Plays (2008)
- Barracoon: The Story of the Last "Black Cargo" (2018)
- Hitting a Straight Lick with a Crooked Stick: Stories from the Harlem Renaissance (2020)
- You Don't Know Us Negroes and Other Essays (2022)
- The Life of Herod the Great: A Novel (2025)

== See also ==
- Florida literature
- List of people from Harlem
- African-American literature
