= Bull Creek (Texas) =

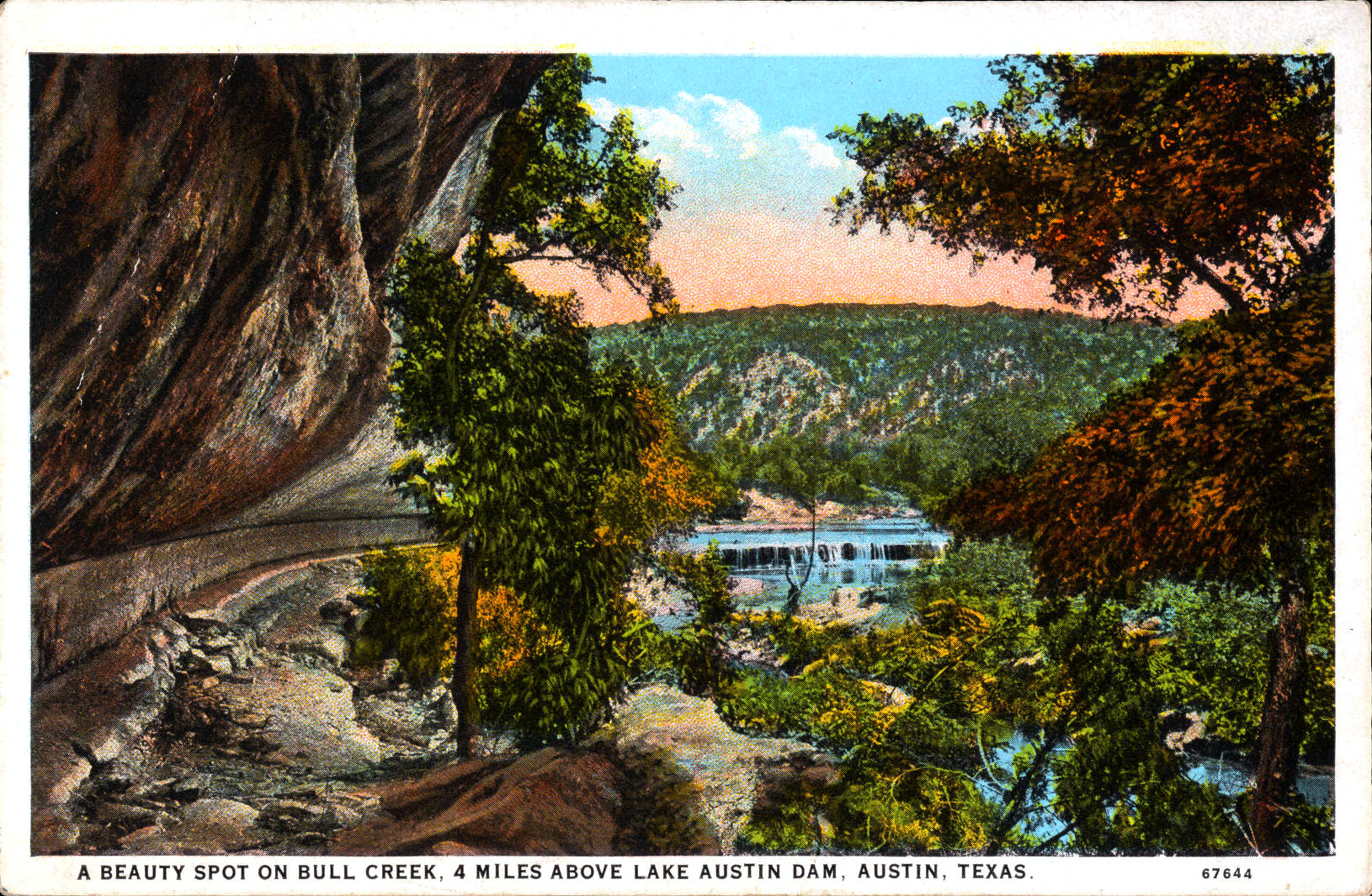
- Map of Bull Creek (red) and West Bull Creek (purple). The blue lines denote the boundaries of the watershed (ie. Bull Creek and West Bull Creek each have their own watershed).

Location
- Country: United States

Physical characteristics
- Mouth
  - location: Colorado River
- Basin size: 36,000 acres (150 km^{2})

Bull Creek is a tributary of the Colorado River originating in the Texas Hill Country. The creek passes through some of the more scenic areas in the Austin region and forms a greenbelt that is the habitat for many indigenous species of flora and fauna. It runs beneath steep slopes and benches surfaced with shallow clay loams that support ashe juniper, escarpment live oak, mesquite, and grasses.

The creek begins in north central Travis County (at 30°23′42″N 97°50′20″W) and flows approximately 12 miles (19 km) southeast through Austin to Lake Austin, where it merges with the Colorado River (at 30°20′51″N 97°47′30″W).

Bull Creek is flanked by areas of the Balcones Canyonlands National Wildlife Refuge.

== Recreation ==
There are parks and hiking trails along the banks of Bull Creek. The Bull Creek Trail offers a hiking and swimming opportunities. Bull Creek Park is a popular spot with easy access from Capital of Texas Highway, while St. Edwards Park (map) offers a more secluded experience.

== History ==
Archaeological investigations of the Bull Creek area show a long history of utilization by humans. One study sponsored by the Bull Creek Foundation found prehistoric utilization dating from "Early Archaic to Late Prehistoric (Toyah phase)".

Among the early Anglo settlers to the Bull Creek area were Will Preece, wife Elizabeth Gideon, and sons Richard Lincoln Preece (also known as Dick Preece) and Will Jr., both of whom would go on to be Texas Rangers. The Preece family owned about “three thousand acres that stretched from Lake Travis to Cedar Park, roughly along FM 1431”.

Will Preece brought his family to Texas about 1838 and settled in the Bull Creek area. The name “Bull Creek” is attributed to the killing of a male buffalo on Bull Creek, either by Will Preece, or by his son Dick. In his article, “My Grandfather, Dick Preece”, Real West magazine, Harold Preece, grandson of Dick Preece, claims it was his great-grandfather, Will Preece, while other sources cite Dick Preece. That same article says that “A few miles from the Preece ranch lay the southern terminus of the bloody Comanche Trail”, and Dick Preece was active as a Texas Ranger in combatting the Comanche in Texas. During the Civil War, the Preece family, like many in Travis County, opposed secession from the Union, and the remote location and "caves" of Bull Creek provided a base for Union loyalists resisting the Confederacy. After the Civil War, a feeder branch of the Chisholm Trail is said to have passed by the house of Dick Preece.

After his death in 1919 Dick Preece was buried along West Bull Creek, at the Preece cemetery, on Vaught Ranch Rd. Austin, TX 78730, just off RM 2222 (lat/long 30.372948,-97.807322). The University of Texas’ Briscoe Center for American History is home to the “Richard Lincoln Preece Papers, 1859-1919”, which comprises correspondence, printed material, legal and financial documents, etc. pertaining to Dick Preece's experiences as a soldier serving in the Civil War and as a rancher following the war.

The History of Travis County and Austin states "The Mormons are credited with construction, in 1846, of one of Travis County's oldest roads to the northwest, the one that today is a scenic drive along Bull Creek to the Spicewood Springs Road, and which then led to a mill on Bull Creek used after the Mormon Mill washed away". The "Mormon Mill" referenced is the one that was built near what used to be called the "Great Falls" on the Colorado river before Tom Miller Dam was constructed, and the "scenic drive" is today Lakewood Drive. Most of the original road is now under Loop 360.

As of May 2021, the City of Austin was in negotiations to buy one 10-acre plot of land along the Bull Creek Greenbelt and has begun eminent domain proceedings to acquire another adjacent 11-acre plot of land to expand the current greenbelt.

== See also ==
- List of rivers of Texas
