= Moses, Man of the Mountain =

1939 novel by Zora Neale Hurston

Moses, Man of the Mountain is a 1939 novel by African-American novelist and anthropologist Zora Neale Hurston. The novel rewrites the story of the Book of Exodus of Moses and the Israelites from an Afro-American perspective. The novel applies a number of different motifs and themes commonly addressed in African-American culture, subverting the Moses story.

== Plot summary ==
After the Pharaoh of Egypt declared that Hebrew boys could no longer be born, Amram and Jochebed began to discuss their course of action if their child to be is a boy. If found, the child would be killed by the Egyptians. Jochebed gives birth to a son in hiding and decides to put him in a basket on the Nile River in order to spare him. Her son is found in the river by the Egyptian princess whose own son had died. She decides to raise him as an Egyptian, keeping his identity as an Israelite secret from everyone else. The princess brings him to the castle and names him Moses. As the son of the princess, he is second in line for the throne.

As Moses grows older, he gains interests in nature and animals, learning tales from the palace stableman, Mentu, who becomes Moses’ greatest friend. Mentu teaches Moses the traditional ways of Egyptian people, including battling on horses instead of chariots. Moses learns to ride a horse for this purpose, and becomes a great fighter in Egypt. Ta Phar, first in line for the throne, dislikes Moses due to his peculiar interests and ways of living that he learns from Mentu. Mentu also sparks Moses’ interest in religion, telling him of the Book of Thoth, a book that provides great wisdom to any man who reads it. Moses sits with Mentu for hours daily listening to him tell stories of God.

After Moses gets married, information regarding Moses’ origin circulates, leading people to suspect that he is an Israelite. Though Moses does not know that he had been born to Hebrew parents, he decides to leave Egypt that night and seek the Book of Thoth. Moses travels through the night and eventually reaches Midian, where he assists young girls in escaping from boys who were bullying them. They then bring him to their father, Jethro, the chief of Midian, who takes a liking to Moses right away. Moses agrees to use his military skills to assist Jethro in ridding the land of Midian of thieves. After this, Jethro allows Moses to marry his daughter, Zipporah, and Moses stays in Midian for twenty years.

After twenty years, Moses decides to venture out and seek the Book of Thoth. Moses returns after a year to tell Jethro of his successful journey. Moses tells Jethro how he found the book and that he now can command the skies and mountains and knows the language of all animals. Jethro tells Moses that he has a mission for him, the mission being to free the Israelites from slavery in Egypt. Moses is unsure about this and feels that he is not capable of completing such a task. While sitting on a mountain, Moses sees a burning bush and hears it speak to him. God speaks to Moses through the burning bush and commands him to free the Israelites.

After speaking with Jethro and Aaron, Moses heads to Egypt to speak to Pharaoh. Pharaoh denies Moses’ request for him to free the Israelites and believes that Moses performs hoodoo and has no power that comes from God. After Pharaoh continues to refuse to free the Israelites, Moses turns the Nile River into blood, the first of his ten plagues. The people of Egypt believe that it is a trick and will be the only plague that Moses creates. Next, Moses fills Egypt with frogs that continue multiplying. Pharaoh takes credit for both of these plagues, claiming that he is showing his power to the Egyptians. After Pharaoh still refuses to free the Israelites, Moses gives Egypt a plague of lice, making the Egyptians extremely uncomfortable and causing panic. Pharaoh told his citizens that the plague occurred because they upset the Gods. After this comes the plague of flies and then livestock dying. With each plague, the people of Egypt are becoming more anxious. Following this comes plagues of boils, hail, locusts, and then darkness. Pharaoh continues to deny Moses’ demands, leading to Moses’ last plague: the death of firstborn children.

After Pharaoh’s firstborn child dies, he feels defeated and tells Moses that he is free to lead the Israelites out of Egypt. Most of the Hebrews are thrilled to be free, but others doubt Moses and his speech of God. Nevertheless, they follow Moses out of Egypt. On the second day of their journey, Pharaoh and the Egyptian army attempt to recapture the Israelites. Moses parts the red sea and crosses with the Israelites, then unparts the sea, swarming the Egyptians with water.

Moses continues to preach the word of God to the Israelites as they walk for forty years. God’s power is shown through his production of manna when the Israelites complain that they are hungry. Eventually, some of the Israelites begin to question Moses’ authority, to which he lifts his right hand in response and proves his power to them every time. After forty years, Moses decides he would like to ask God and nature questions, so he sat on top of a mountain and spent the rest of his life with God and nature.

== Characters ==
=== Moses ===
Moses is the son of Amram and Jochebed, two Israelites who are enslaved in Egypt. Moses is placed in a basket in the Nile river after his birth because infant boys of Israelites would be drowned if found. Moses is taken in by the Egyptian princess, who raises him as her own, making him a prince. He becomes a great warrior but later leaves Egypt to seek out the book of Thoth and become a priest. After becoming a loyal follower of God, he is commanded to free the Israelites and lead them out of Egypt. Moses leads the Israelites out of Egypt and spreads God’s word to them.

=== Jethro ===
Jethro is the chief of the land of Midian, who Moses meets on his journey out of Egypt. He is also known as Ruel. Jethro takes Moses in as a son when he marries his daughter, Zipporah. Moses helps Jethro bring order to Midian while Jethro teaches him the ways of priests for many years.

=== Mentu ===
Mentu is the stableman at the Egyptian palace where Moses lives during the time he is a prince. He is Moses’ closest friend who teaches him the ways of animals and first inspires him to seek the book of Thoth. Mentu dies before Moses leaves Egypt, and Moses gives him an elaborate burial.

=== Pharaoh ===
Pharaoh is the leader of Egypt who despises Moses for his efforts to set the Israelites free. He endures the ten plagues before allowing Moses to lead the Israelites out of Egypt. He later follows them in an attempt to recapture the Israelites and defeat Moses, but he does not succeed.

=== Zipporah ===
Zipporah is one of the daughters of Jethro who lives in the land of Midian. Moses helps her and her sisters when they are being bullied by boys that do not live in the land. She later marries Moses and lives with him for twenty years before he journeys to find the Book of Thoth. After Moses leads the Israelites out of Egypt, Zipporah joins him on their journey until she is brought back home to Midian by her father.

=== Amram ===
Amram is the father of Moses. He is an enslaved Israelite who must help hide the arrival of Moses until they can release him into the Nile River. He never saw Moses again after this.

=== Jochebed ===
Jochebed is the mother of Moses. She is an enslaved Israelite who gives birth to him while hiding his arrival from the Egyptians. She is not present when he is released in a basket in the Nile River, but she hears that he is taken by the Egyptian princess. She then makes an effort to become the nurse of Moses for the Egyptian princess and she succeeds. After this, she never sees Moses again.

== African American Perspective ==
=== Worship ===
In Moses, Man of the Mountain, rather than the Israelites worshiping God through Moses’ relaying of prayer, Moses himself is worshiped by the Israelites. They view him as all powerful and extraordinary. Hurston foregrounds non-biblical aspects in the novel and contradicts the Judeo-Christian perspective of Moses. Hurston also emphasizes the ways in which Moses somewhat forces a new religion on the Israelites with little to no explanation. Moses is worshiped by the Israelites because he is who freed them from Egypt, but Moses only did this because God told him to. Hurston portrays Moses as being neutral to the Israelites.

=== Male Dominance ===
Throughout the novel, Moses is constantly questioned by the Israelites and proves himself to be powerful many times while some still are in disbelief. Hurston questions the idea of a singular figure in power through the criticism Moses receives from the Israelites. Male dominance is also criticized in the same way. The Israelites question Moses but eventually accept his leadership again. Hurston comments on both male dominance and fantasized racial hierarchy through her portrayal of Moses.

=== Complexity of Identities ===
Moses is born as an Israelite to Amram and Jochebed, two enslaved Israelites. Because he is then taken in and raised as Egyptian royalty, his identity is both culturally and ethnically complex. Though Moses never actually questions his identity, Hurston formulated his identity to comment on the limitations that defining a person’s identity can bring. Moses avoids explicitly identifying himself with the Israelites, but his backstory is present as an indicator of his complex identity.

=== Slavery ===
Slavery is portrayed in the novel through the Israelites in Egypt. Hurston tells the story of the slavery and freedom of the Israelites from an African American perspective, portraying Moses as a figure of hope for the Israelites. In the traditional African American telling of the story of Moses, he is worshiped by the Israelites more than God himself. During slavery in the United States, God was a source of hope for those who were enslaved as well, which is reflected in Moses, Man of the Mountain. African Americans commonly relied on the Exodus narrative during the time of slavery, making the novel especially relatable to African Americans who were enslaved.

== Critical reception ==
Moses, Man of the Mountain received very mixed receptions originally, with some believing that the novel was useless and others believing it was powerful.

Writing in the context of Adolf Hitler's rise to power, critic Mark Christian Thompson describes the novel as critiquing the authoritarian tactics of states, and becomes a metaphor critiquing the premises of National Socialism.

Brad Hooper emphasizes Zora Neale Hurston’s importance as a writer during the Harlem Renaissance and writes that the novel is a metaphor for the black experience. Other writers, such as Valerie Boyd also believed that the novel was a masterpiece and was powerful in terms of Black literature.

On the other hand, Alain Locke described the novel as caricature, believing that it did not portray anything of substance. Ralph Ellison, Robert Hemenway, and Lillie P. Howard also believed that the novel did nothing for Black fiction and considered it a failure. In the current day, the novel is used as a topic of discussion in writing often.
