= Charlotte Osgood Mason =

American socialite and philanthropist

Charlotte Osgood Mason, born Charlotte Louise Van der Veer Quick (May 18, 1854, Franklin Park, New Jersey – April 15, 1946, New York City), was a white American socialite and philanthropist. She contributed more than $100,000 to a number of African-American artists and writers of the Harlem Renaissance, equal to more than $1 million in 2003. This was especially critical during the Great Depression, when foundation support declined. She helped young artists become established.

== Biography ==
She was born Charlotte Louise Van der Veer Quick in Franklin Park, New Jersey, on May 18, 1854, to Peter Quick and Phoebe Van der Veer. She was brought up by her maternal grandfather, Schenck Van der Veer, whose last name she used in preference to Quick. She was educated privately, as was typical for upper-class girls.

Van der Veer married Rufus Osgood Mason on April 27, 1886. She came from a rich family and her wealth increased when she inherited the estate of her husband after his death.

== Patronage ==
She used her wealth to become a literary and cultural patron, supporting such artists and writers as Alain Locke, Aaron Douglas, Langston Hughes, Arthur Fauset, and Miguel Covarrubias of the Harlem Renaissance. Zora Neale Hurston was another emerging writer she supported, at the recommendation of Locke, after Hurston published some short stories.

Hurston was also studying anthropology and from 1928 to 1932, Mason supported the writer during her research into African-American folklore and culture in the Deep South, Haiti and Jamaica. Mason also supported Hurston during her writing of a book on Cudjoe Lewis, known then as the last survivor of the 1860 illegal Clotilda. For various reasons, this was not published in 1931, when Hurston submitted it to a publisher. It was published posthumously in 2018 as Barracoon: The Story of the Last "Black Cargo". After learning about Cudjoe Lewis from Hurston's 1928 article about him, Mason also helped support the elderly man, who lived in Africatown, a neighborhood of Mobile, Alabama.

Mason has been criticized for trying to control the work of the writers she supported. She insisted on being called "Godmother", and she developed intricate and controlling relationships with the people she helped. She contributed a total of "more than $100,000 to African-American writers and artists during the Harlem Renaissance, the equivalent of more than $1,000,000 in 2003." She is cited in Zora and Langston: A Story of Friendship and Betrayal by Yuval Taylor (2020). Black feminist scholar bell hooks writes critically of the relationship between Mason and Hurston: "It is difficult to believe that Hurston was blind to the cultural imperialism, the white supremacy of her sponsor, Mrs. Mason. This 'world's most gallant woman' had compelled Hurston to sign a legal agreement which specified that all material she gathered would be the legal property of her patron and that Hurston could use such material only when granted permission." Scholars such as Hooks and Irma McClaurin argue that because of Mason's financial support of Hurston she enforced specific themes and subjects onto Hurston's work. One explicit area of interest Mason pushed on Hurston was the notion of finding the "authentic" Black life or culture and writing about it. McClaurin states though that by doing so the "authentic" Black life or culture is judged by Mason's white standard and understanding. She becomes the "arbiter of "authenticity".

Mason's controlling patronage can also be seen in her relationship with Langston Hughes. Beginning in 1927, Mason subsidized Hughes for three years. Mason believed that he could express her own ideas about the "primitive" in his writing. In their relationship, Mason controlled more than his writing by dictating the music he was allowed to listen to and the books he was allowed to read. Mason asked that he write only to her, further isolating him from any influence that was not her own. After three years of her patronage, Hughes cut ties with Mason. When their relationship ended, Mason predicted that Hughes would fall and reminded him that his accomplishments so far would have been nothing without her support. This "unpleasant goodbye" was "traumatic for Hughes and irrevocable for both concerned".

== See also ==
- Carl Van Vechten
