= Bull Creek District Park =

Park in Austin, Texas, United States

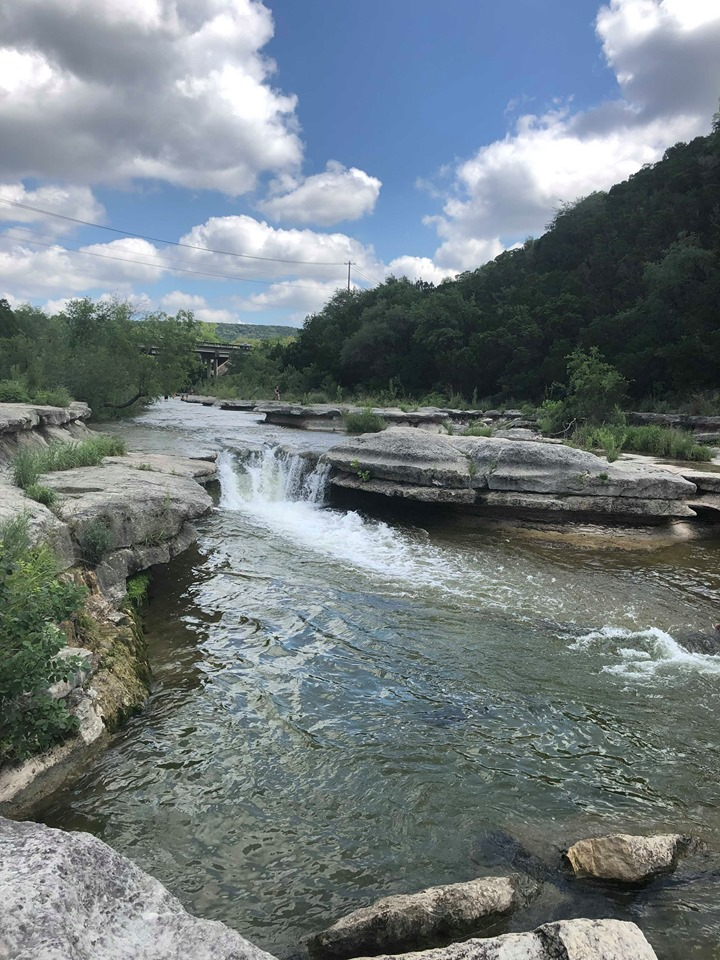
- Interactive map of Bull Creek District Park
- Location: 6701 Lakewood Dr. Austin, Texas, USA
- Coordinates: 30°22′07″N 97°47′05″W
- Created: 1971

Bull Creek District Park is a 48-acre (19 ha) city park in Austin, Texas. The park was created in 1971, and named for Bull Creek, the stream that passes through it and provides the focal point of the park's primary attractions of swimming, hiking, and fishing.

In 2012, Austin's Parks and Recreation Department initiated the creation of a master plan for further park development. Plan completion was expected in 2016, with design and construction pending.
