= Mules and Men =

1935 book by Zora Neale Hurston

- First edition
- Author: Zora Neale Hurston
- Illustrator: Miguel Covarrubias
- Cover artist: Miguel Covarrubias
- Language: English
- Genre: African-American folklore
- Publisher: J. B. Lippincott & Co.
- Publication date: 1935
- Publication place: United States
- Media type: Print

Mules and Men is a 1935 autoethnographical collection of African-American folklore collected and written by anthropologist Zora Neale Hurston. The book explores stories she collected in two trips: one in Eatonville and Polk County, Florida, and one in New Orleans.

Hurston's decision to focus her research on Florida came from a desire to record the cross-section of black traditions in the state. In her introduction to Mules and Men, she wrote: "Florida is a place that draws people—white people from all over the world, and Negroes from every Southern state surely and some from the North and West." Hurston documented 70 folktales during the Florida trip, while the New Orleans trip yielded a number of stories about Marie Laveau, voodoo and Hoodoo traditions. Many of the folktales are told in vernacular eye dialect, attempting to portray the dialect and diction of the Black communities that Hurston studied.

The book embraces both her own re-immersion in the folklore of her childhood, and a desire to document those traditions as part of the emergent anthropological sciences. Subsequently, the book has been described as an important text for the canonization of Hurston in both American and African-American literature, and in developing fields such as ethnography and critical race theory.

== Summary ==
=== Frame stories ===
Hurston adopts a semi-autobiographical narration of someone who is sent out to collect Black folklore from Hurston's real home town of Eatonville, Florida. Hurston chose Eatonville as the location for her folklore collection because she knew the people there would not consider her diploma or credentials and instead would treat her as another local. Her frame story persona records both the folktales themselves and the context in which she supposedly heard the stories. She describes life in the Eatonville township and the daily life of its Black population as they play games such as "Florida-Flip", go to work in the local saw mill, fall in love, and have other ordinary experiences. The dialogue and the stories are written in vernacular eye dialect, presumably attempting to record the way people spoke in Eatonville at the time. For example, when B. Mosely asks Hurston if she's going to stay awhile, Hurston records the question as "You gointer stay awhile, Zora?"

Hurston's frame stories are often broken up by folktales, as the characters in Eatonville stop what they are doing to tell a folktale that is applicable to the situation at the time. Black men on the way to work in the difficult conditions of a sawmill tell stories about John, an enslaved man who outwitted the devil, his white master, and tried to trick God himself. This is the central narrative conceit of Mules and Men and forms the basis of the work.

In part two of Mules and Men, Hurston travels to New Orleans to collect folk tales, learning from various practitioners of hoodoo, each with their own specialties. Unlike part one of the book, the second part does not flip back and forth between frame stories and independent folk tales. Instead, this section is seen entirely through the Hurston's authorial persona, recounting the events of each hoodoo ritual with a first-person perspective. Often, Hurston will help or participate in the ritual itself.

=== Folklore ===
Mules and Men contains more than seventy different folktales from across the Black tradition. Most of them concern racism, slavery, or oppression, and feature weaker characters who trick stronger characters. Some of these stories concern personified animals such as Brer Rabbit, or Brer Gator, and attempt to explain why something in nature is the way that it is. Others are part of the oral tradition of enslaved people in the United States and offer a look at the forms of resistance and culture developed in the antebellum south. The folktales presented in Mules and Men are short, only a few pages long at most. Several of the most prominent stories in the book are listed below.

==== "Ole Massa and John Who Wanted to Go to Heaven" ====
John is an enslaved man who features in several stories in Mules and Men. He is always known for his trickery and intelligence. In one story, John prays to God for deliverance from slavery. His master overhears him, and decides to dress up in a sheet to trick John into running away. The master goes to John's cabin and says that he is God, and is going to take John away to heaven in a fiery chariot. John realizes the trick, and when his master comes to his door, tells "God" that he is too dirty to be in the presence of God and he needs to change his pants and his shirt. Then he tells "God" that "yo' countenance is so bright Ah can't come out to you." "God" agrees to take several steps backwards, away from the front door. When "God" does this, John runs away.

==== "How the Gator Got Black" ====
This is one of a number of folktales in Mules and Men that concern Brer animals and various creation myths. This story explaining why the gator is colored the way that he is, begins with Brer Gator lounging in the sun, with white skin and coal-colored eyes. Brer Rabbit comes out of the bush in a hurry, and tracks mud all over Brer Gator's albino skin. When Brer Gator gets mad, Brer Rabbit tells him to wait for a moment and he will show Brer Gator what real trouble is. Brer Gator agrees to this, and Brer Rabbit lights a fire all around Brer Gator. The smoke blackens Brer Gator's skin, and reddens his eyes, and this is why alligators are colored the way that they are.

==== "'You Think I'm Gointer Pay You But I Ain't'" ====
A Black man is employed in a lumberyard, but is too lazy to do his work. Whenever his employer comes by, he says: "Klunk, Klunk, you think Ah'm workin' but Ah ain't." When the Black man goes to collect his money, his employer says: "Clink, Clink you think I'm gointer pay you, but I ain't.”

=== Hoodoo ===
Hoodoo, is a traditional spiritual practice that originated among enslaved people in North America, combining traditional African religious elements with those of Christianity. Hurston states that she chose New Orleans to study Hoodoo in the United States, as it is an area with a rich Hoodoo tradition that rivals Haiti or Africa. In Mules and Men, Hurston chronicles her experiences with seven different Hoodoo practitioners throughout New Orleans.

==== "Ritual to Get a Man" ====
Write the name of the man you want and his wife nine times on a small piece of paper and stick it in a lemon. Cut a hole in the stem of the lemon and pour gun powder into the hole. Wrap the lemon in salt, and bury in the married couple's yard. The bloom end must be buried downward. The couple will split. This ritual is conducted under the supervision of Eulalia, a specialist in domestic hoodoo. It is performed for a local woman who wants to be with a married man, and is unhappy that he is in a relationship. She wants him to divorce his wife and contacts Eulalia to ensure that it happens.

==== "Initiation Ceremony" ====
Remain inside for five days, abstaining from sexual intercourse and not eating or drinking anything aside from water. Enter a room with a hoodoo elder while dressed in white. Light a black candle at each of the white candles. Then knock down all of the candles. Then pinch out the black candle. This is the recorded initiation ceremony for Father Watson, and must be completed before Hurston is allowed to view any of the other rituals that Watson performs.

==== "To Punish" ====
Write the man's name on a piece of paper and put it in a sugar bowl. Add red pepper, black one nail, fifteen cents of ammonia and two door keys. Leave one key on the side of the bowl. Every day at noon, turn the key against the side of the bowl, adding vinegar.

==== "To Help a Person in Jail" ====
Collect dirt from the graves of nine children. In the altar room, add three teaspoons of sugar and Sulphur. Turn a set of underclothes and a set of tan socks inside out, and cover with graveyard dirt. Go the jail house and read the Thirty-fifth Psalm every day. When the course comes to trial, have the accused wear the clothes sprinkled with graveyard dirt. Write the prisoner's name, the judge's name, and the district attorney's name three times and have the accused wear it in his shoe. Cover his clothes in rose geranium, lavender oil and verbena oil. Rub down the jury box. Take a beef tongue and split it using nine needles and nine pins. Pin the names of the opposition witnesses with the split tongue and some red pepper. Smoke them in a chimney for 36 hours. Ask the spirits for power more equal to a man.

== Reception ==
When it was first published in 1935 by J. B. Lippincott & Co., Mules and Men received mixed reviews, according to some scholars. The book fell into obscurity for several decades before being rediscovered by Alice Walker in 1975. Because of Hurston's unique style and use of "frame stories" inside Mules and Men, it was generally popular with common people who found the story more approachable than other anthropologies of the time. The character Hurston presents, unassuming and non-threatening, allowed her to write about Black folklore in a way that would not upset white audiences at the time. Indeed, some white reviewers found the book a "straightforward, nonthreatening depiction of the humorous and exotic side of Black culture in the rural south." Hurston's Black contemporaries were less effusive in their praise, noting that the book presented a somewhat rosy picture of Black life in the south and that it should have been more "bitter".

Among the scientific community, the reception was lukewarm. Hurston's unique narrative devices created a work that the contemporary scientific establishment judged as childlike and ill-advised. Franz Boas, her academic mentor and the father of American anthropology, wrote in its preface that "It is the great merit of Miss Hurston's work that she entered into the homely life of the southern Negro" with the "charm of a loveable personality and of a revealing style." Boas's introduction gave some credence to Mules and Men but at the cost of Hurston's authorial autonomy. Hurston was entirely dependent on his introduction to give her any respectability among the intellectual milieu.
