= Redoshi =

Enslaved West African woman (1848–1937)

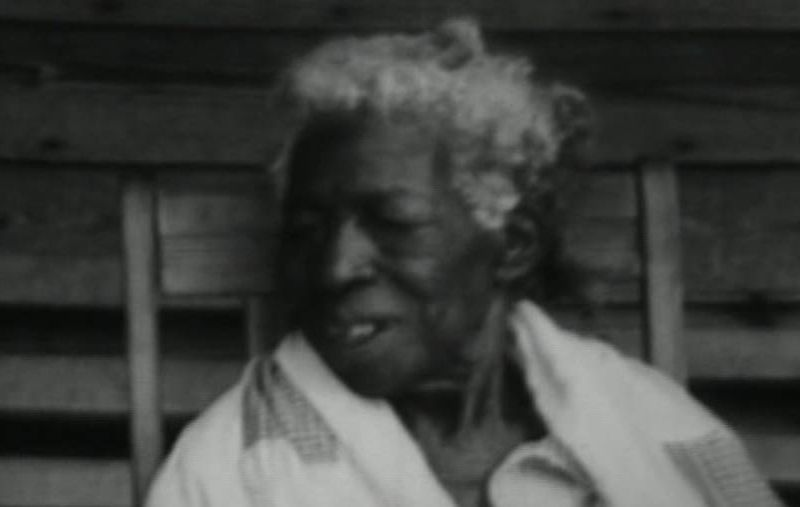
- Redoshi in The Negro Farmer (1938)
- Born: Redoshi c. 1848; West Africa (present-day Benin)
- Died: 1937 (aged c. 89); Alabama, U.S.
- Other name: Sally Smith
- Known for: One of the last surviving victims of the transatlantic slave trade

Redoshi (c. 1848 – 1937) was a West African woman who was enslaved and smuggled to the U.S. state of Alabama as a girl in 1860. Until a later surviving claimant, Matilda McCrear, was announced in 2020, she was considered to have been the last surviving victim of the transatlantic slave trade. Taken captive in warfare at age 12 by the West African kingdom of Dahomey, she was sold to Americans and transported by ship to the United States in violation of U.S. law. She was sold again and enslaved on the upcountry plantation of the Washington M. Smith family in Dallas County, Alabama, where her owner renamed her Sally Smith.

Redoshi survived slavery and the imposition of Jim Crow laws during the post-Reconstruction era of disenfranchisement, and lived into the Great Depression. She lived long enough to become acquainted with people active in the civil rights movement; she is the only known female transatlantic slavery survivor to have been filmed and to have been interviewed for a newspaper.

== Biography ==
Redoshi lived in a village in West Africa in present day Benin. The name "Redoshi" is unknown in West Africa, though 14 names similar to it appear in the African Origins database. Her village was attacked in a raid by warriors of the Kingdom of Dahomey, who killed her father (possibly a village leader) and took her captive at about age 12, around 1860. They sold her to the American captain of the illegal slave ship Clotilda. She was forced to marry another captive, a man also from West Africa who was already married and spoke a different language. Her husband was later referred to as "Uncle Billy" or "Yawith".

Redoshi was transported on the Clotilda, the last ship known to bring enslaved African people to the United States. Its owners did so illegally, as more than 50 years earlier the U.S. had abolished the importation of slaves. Alabama businessman Timothy Meaher had commissioned the captain and ship for a slave-buying mission to Ouidah, a port city in what is today Benin.

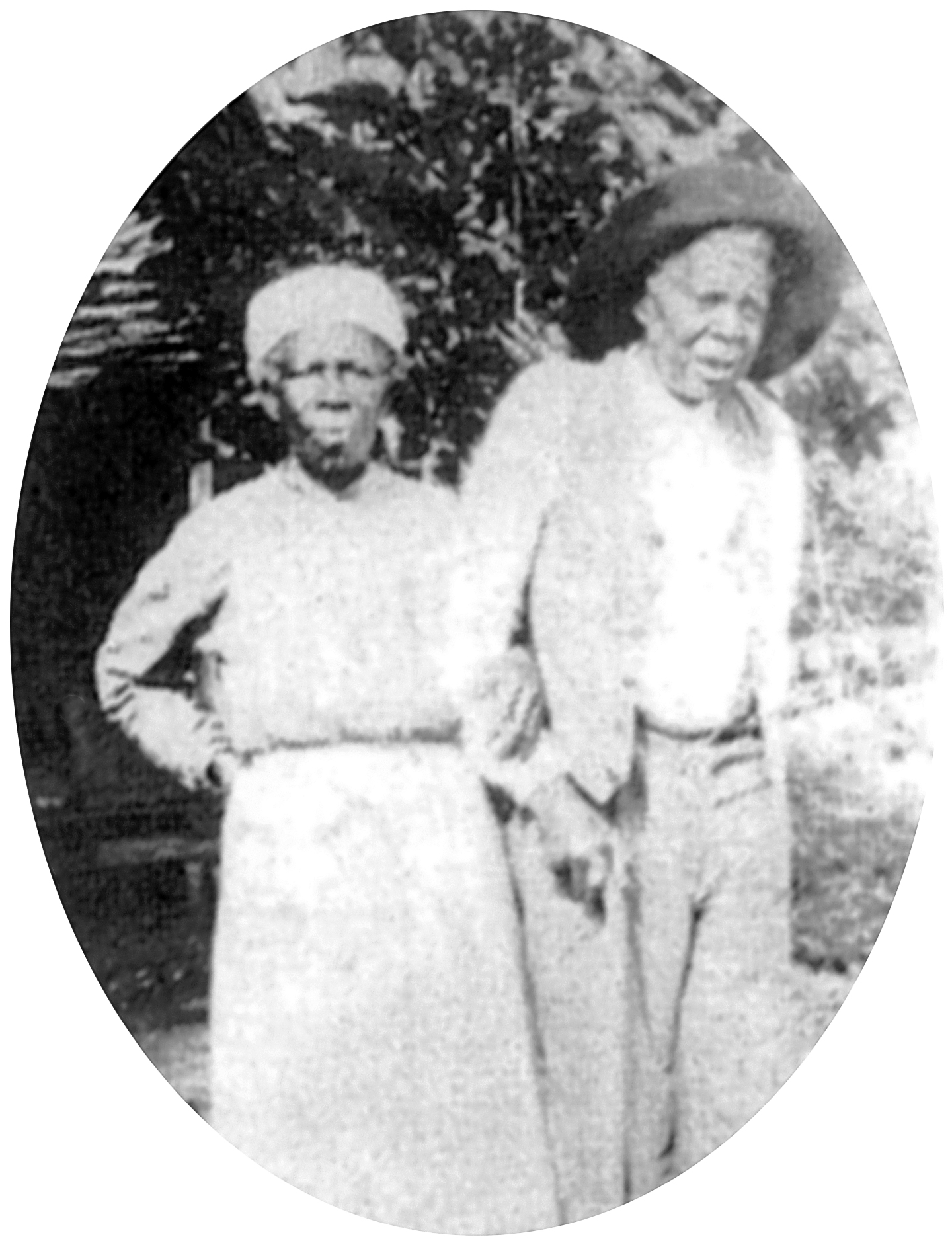
Redoshi and her husband

After the ship reached Mobile, Mobile County, Alabama, where Meaher lived, Redoshi was sold with her husband to Washington Smith, a planter in Dallas County, Alabama, about 15 miles (24 km) west of Selma. Smith was a wealthy man who owned a big plantation in Bogue Chitto. He also had a townhouse in Selma and was among the founders of the Bank of Selma. He renamed her "Sally Smith" and put her to work in the fields and sometimes the big house. Apparently, two of the Dahomey warriors who had kidnapped Redoshi and her kinfolk were also taken captive after boarding the ship to mock the captives and did not notice when it set sail until being told by Captain Foster that they too were going to be transported to America. They worked alongside Redoshi in the fields, and she never forgave them.

After emancipation, Redoshi (aged 17) and her husband Yawith continued to live on the plantation, working as sharecroppers. Washington Smith died in 1869, but his wife continued to run the plantation. Together with advance merchants and others, the planters essentially controlled the finances of the sharecroppers and settled annual accounts to their own benefit. Redoshi and her husband survived, though in poverty; they may have owned land in or near Bogue Chitto. The couple had a daughter together and raised her. Although she adopted Christianity, Redoshi also practiced her African religious traditions and taught them to her daughter. Yawith died in the 1910s or 1920s; Redoshi died in 1937. Her daughter was listed on the U.S. Census and in marriage documents variously as "Leasy", "Luth A.", "Lethe", "Letia", and "Lethy", and had children.

== Historiography ==
Seventy-two years ago a dark supple princess of the Tarkars, African Congo River Basin tribe, lived peacefully with her husband in the heart of the dark continent. She was 25 years old, strong and healthy, and imbued with the love of life in the jungles. Today this same princess, nearing the century mark in age, lives in a cabin on the Quarles plantation 18 miles from Selma.

— "Survivor of Last Slave Cargo Lives on Plantation Near Selma"
Montgomery Advertiser, January 31, 1932

Scholar Hannah Durkin of Newcastle University pieced together an account of Redoshi's life and concluded that she was the last survivor of the slaves transported by the illegal slaver's ship Clotilda and of the transatlantic slave trade. Previously historians believed that Cudjoe Lewis (Kossola) was the last survivor of the transatlantic slave trade. A spokesman for Africatown in Mobile, he was interviewed by numerous people. His life was written about by Emma Langdon Roche in a 1914 book and by Zora Neale Hurston in a 1928 article. Hurston returned to Alabama to interview him over a period of months and wrote a book about him, but it was not published until 2018, long after her death, as Barracoon: The Story of the Last "Black Cargo". The appendix lists Sally Smith as having a son, Jessie Smith, a farmer, but Redoshi's only known child was a daughter.

Durkin noted the limited number of sources that refer to the West African woman: notes and a letter by Zora Neale Hurston to Langston Hughes, not published during her lifetime; a Montgomery, Alabama, newspaper interview from 1932; a federal government educational film from 1938, in which she briefly appears; a brief account in the memoir of a civil-rights activist, and various data from the U.S. Census and other records. They are "fragmentary, frequently contradictory...[;] The gaps and inconsistencies across these materials help to underscore the inexpressibility of transatlantic slavery as a lived experience".

In 1928, Hurston had written to her friend Langston Hughes about her travels in Alabama interviewing African Americans. She said that Lewis was not the only survivor of the Clotilda: she had also met a "most delightful" woman, "older than Cudjoe, about 200 miles up state on the Tombig[b]ee river". Hurston did not write further about Redoshi, but she included the name "Sally Smith" and biographical details in an appendix of her manuscript for what was posthumously published as Every Tongue Got to Confess: Negro Folk-tales from the Gulf States (2001). It was based on the manuscript and notes of about 500 of her interviews. Hurston did not refer to Redoshi in Barracoon, which concentrated on Kossola and his experiences.

Redoshi, referred to as "Aunt Sally Smith", was interviewed in 1932 by the Montgomery Advertiser, when she was living on a plantation then owned by the Quarles family. The article reported that she was 25 when she was captured, that she was a "princess" from the tribe of the Tarkars, and that she came from the same village in present-day Benin as Kossola/Cudjo Lewis. Durkin says this is "apparently the only newspaper article that is devoted to the experiences of a female Middle Passage survivor". The account, she says, is mediated by the white journalist and "reflects its white interviewer's romantic fantasies of the African continent" and "reinforces the customary pre-civil-rights era depictions of U.S. slavery as a benevolent, 'civilising' practice".

Redoshi was filmed for a 1938 educational film, The Negro Farmer: Extension Work for Better Farming and Better Living, made by the United States Department of Agriculture with assistance from the Tuskegee Institute. The film was described as "a paternalistic portrait of black rural life", intended to "halt a mass migration to the urban north by black people". Smith appeared briefly in the film but did not have any spoken lines; she is the second survivor of the Clotilda and the only woman of the transatlantic slave trade to be filmed. The work is held by the Library of Congress. In Documenting Racism: African Americans in US Department of Agriculture Documentaries, 1921–42, J. Emmett Winn describes the footage, saying that the silent portrait of "Aunt Sally Smith", whose abbreviated biography is provided by a white narrator, underscores the poor living conditions of Southern farmers in the Black Belt. It is part of an effort to promote agricultural improvements guided by the USDA's guidance and to emphasize the film's message that "blacks should stay on Southern farms".

Civil-rights activist Amelia Boynton Robinson of Alabama said in her 1979 memoir Bridge across Jordan that she had met "Aunt Sally" in about 1936. Boynton Robinson later organized voter registration and other grassroots efforts there in the early 1960s. She noted that Smith had come from Africa and that they talked about her retention of African cultural traditions within her family. Historian Alston Fitts included a short biography of Redoshi in Selma: A Bicentennial (1989, rep. in 2017), which was based on "Quarles family tradition" and on the account in Robinson's book.

== See also ==
- List of last survivors of American slavery
- Post-1808 importation of slaves to the United States
