= Africatown =

Historic community in Alabama, U.S.

- Africatown Historic District
- U.S. National Register of Historic Places
- U.S. Historic district
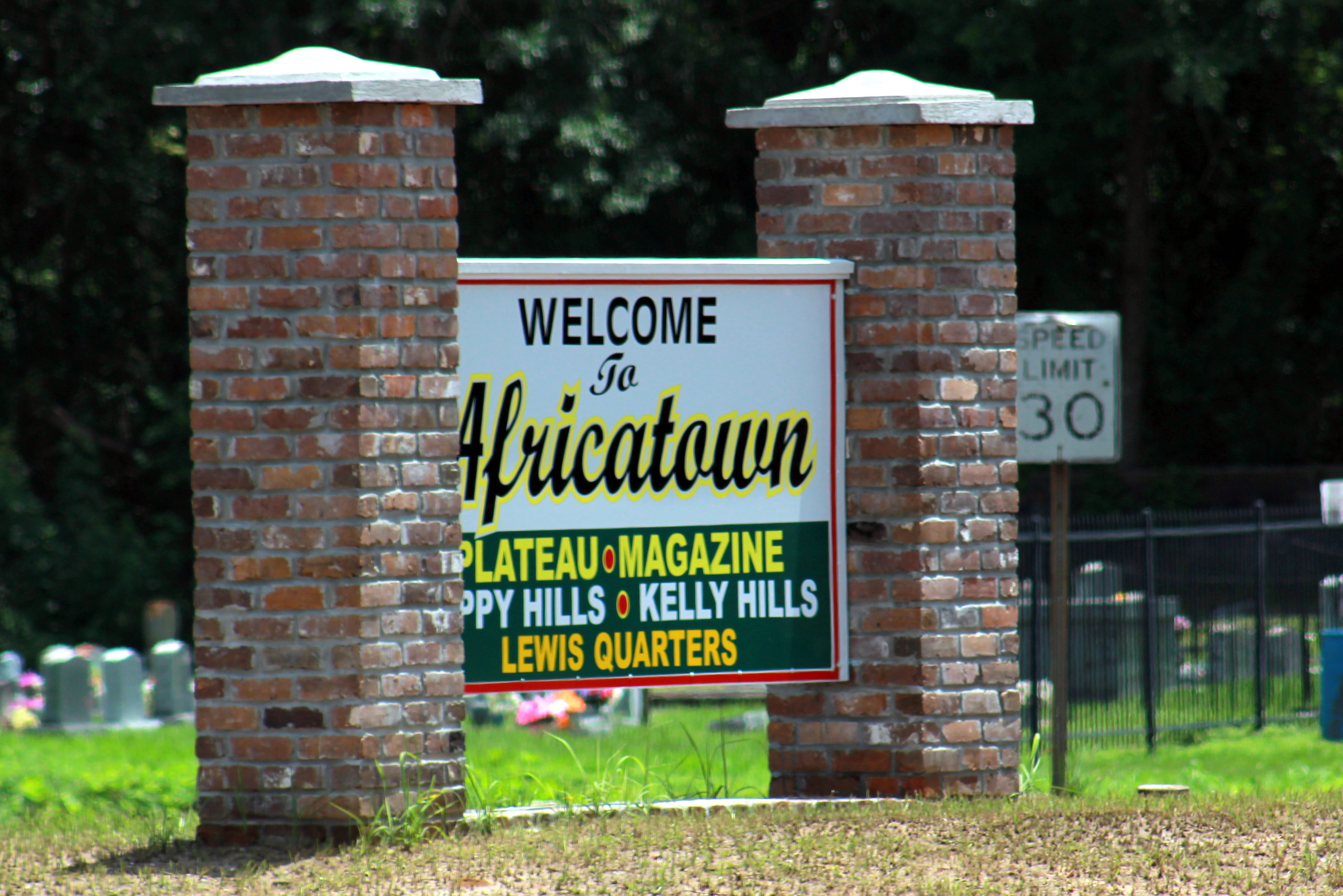
- Africatown welcome sign, 2017
- Interactive map of Africatown Historic District
- Location: Roughly bounded by Jakes Ln., Paper Mill & Warren Rds., Chin & Railroad Sts., in Mobile, Alabama
- Coordinates: 30°43′53.6″N 88°3′36.4″W
- NRHP reference No.: 12000990
- Added to NRHP: December 4, 2012

Africatown, also known as AfricaTown USA and Plateau, is a historic community located three miles (5 km) north of downtown Mobile, Alabama. It was formed by a group of 32 West Africans, who in 1860 were bought and transported against their will in the last known illegal shipment of slaves to the United States. The Atlantic slave trade had been banned since 1808, but 110 slaves held by the Kingdom of Dahomey were smuggled into Mobile on the Clotilda, which was burned and scuttled to try to conceal its illicit cargo. More than 30 of these people, believed to be ethnic Yoruba, Ewe, and Fon, founded and created their own community in what became Africatown. They retained their West African customs and language into the 1950s, while their children and some elders also learned English. Cudjo Kazoola Lewis, a founder of Africatown, lived until 1935 and was long thought to be the last survivor of the slaves from the Clotilda living in Africatown.

In 2019, scholar Hannah Durkin from Newcastle University documented Redoshi, a West African woman who was believed at the time to be the last survivor of slaves from the Clotilda. Also known as Sally Smith, she lived to 1937. She had been sold to a planter who lived in Dallas County, Alabama. Redoshi and her family continued to live there after emancipation, working on the same plantation. Durkin later published research indicating that another slave, Matilda McCrear, in fact outlived Smith, dying in 1940.

The population of Africatown has declined markedly from a peak population of 12,000 in the 20th century, when paper mills operated there. In the early 21st century, the community has about 2,000 residents. It is estimated 100 of them are descendants of the people from the Clotilda. Other descendants live across the country. In 2009, the neighborhood was designated as a site on Mobile's African American Heritage Trail. The Africatown Historic District was listed on the National Register of Historic Places in 2012. Its related Old Plateau Cemetery, also known as Africatown Graveyard, was founded in 1876. It has been given a large historical plaque telling its history.

== History ==
Although the Atlantic slave trade had been prohibited by the United States by the 1807 Act Prohibiting Importation of Slaves, many smugglers continued to deliver slaves while evading federal authorities. In 1860, a group of wealthy slaveholders in Mobile, Alabama decided to make a friendly bet between themselves and a group of men from New England that they could sneak a shipment of slaves into the country without being captured by federal agents. Timothy Meaher, a shipbuilder and landowner; his brother Byrnes (also spelled Burns) Meaher; John Dabey; and others invested money to hire a crew and captain for one of Meaher's ships to go to Africa and buy Africans enslaved by the chiefs of Dahomey.

They used Timothy Meaher's ship Clotilda, which had been designed for the lumber trade. It was commanded by Captain William Foster. While the ship was in port at Whydah in the Kingdom of Dahomey (present-day port of Ouidah in Benin), additional work was done to accommodate and conceal the transport of enslaved people. Foster bought the slaves and loaded them. The ship sailed in May 1860 from Dahomey for its final destination, Mobile, with 110 persons held as slaves. Foster had paid for 125 slaves, but as he was preparing for departure, he saw steamers offshore and rapidly departed to evade them.

The captives were said to be mostly of the "Tarkbar" tribe, but research in the 21st century suggests that they were Takpa people, a band of Yoruba or Nupe people from the interior of present-day Nigeria. They had been taken captive by forces of the King of Dahomey. He sold them into slavery at the market of Whydah. The captured people were sold for $100 each to Foster, captain of the Clotilda.

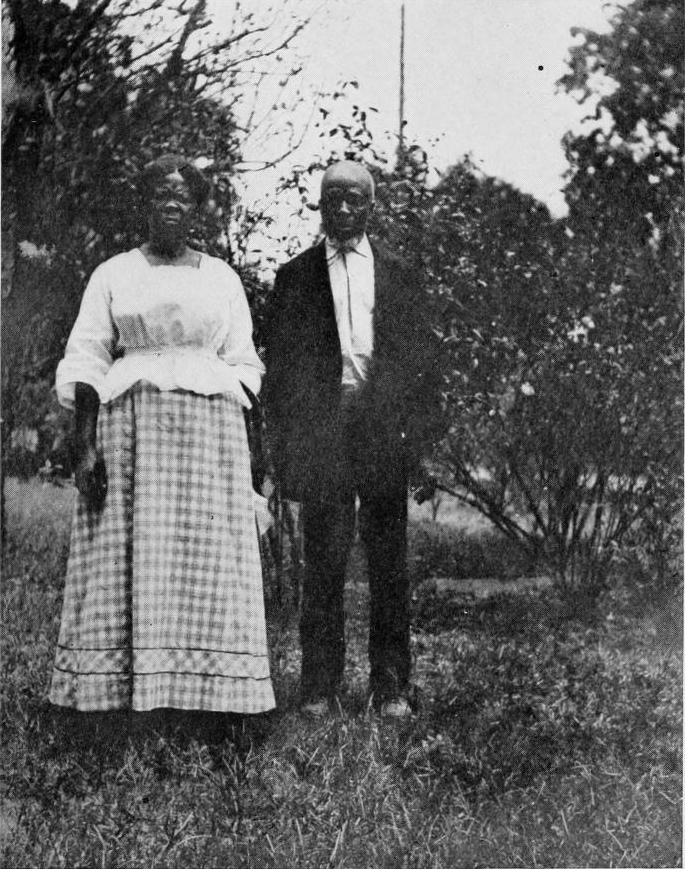
Abaché and Cudjoe Kazoola Lewis at Africatown in the 1910s, two persons from Clotilda

In early July 1860, the Clotilda entered Mobile Bay and approached the port of Mobile. Trying to evade discovery, Foster had the ship towed at night upriver beyond the port. He loaded the slaves onto a steam riverboat and sent them ashore; he set fire to the Clotilda and scuttled it to hide the evidence of its smuggling slaves. The Africans were mostly distributed as slaves among the parties who had invested in the venture. Before being taken from Mobile, they were on their own in terms of surviving. They built shelters out of whatever they could find growing in the Alabama lowlands, and adapted their hunting to the rich game.

Some slaves were sold to areas more distant from Mobile. Among them were Redoshi, a woman from the Clotilda, and a man who became her husband, who were both sold to Washington Smith of Dallas County, Alabama. He had a plantation in the upcountry of the state, and later founded the Bank of Selma. Redoshi was known as Sally Smith as a slave. She married and the couple had a daughter. The family continued to work at the Smith plantation after emancipation. While Redoshi Smith was interviewed by Zora Neale Hurston and known by others, later in her life and after her death, she was forgotten. In 2019, researcher Hannah Durkin published new information about her: she documented that Redoshi Smith lived until 1937, making her apparently the last survivor of the slaves from the Clotilda.

=== US v. Byrnes Meaher, Timothy Meaher and John Dabey ===
Federal authorities prosecuted Meaher and his partners, including Foster. Lacking the ship and related evidence, such as its manifest, the 1861 federal court case of US v. Byrnes Meaher, Timothy Meaher and John Dabey did not find sufficient grounds to convict Meaher. The case was dismissed. Historians believe the start of the American Civil War contributed to the federal government's dropping the case.

=== Post-Civil War to World War II ===
Meaher initially used 32 of the enslaved Africans as workers on his plantation. After the Civil War (1861–1865) they were emancipated, but they continued to work Meaher's property in the delta north of Mobile on the west side of the river. The former slaves founded a community known as Africatown, bounded on three sides by water: a bayou, Three Mile Creek (formerly Chickasabogag Creek), and the Mobile River.

Among the founders of Africatown was a man named Cudjoe Kazoola Lewis (his Yoruba name was Kazoola or Kossola). He was said to be the oldest slave on the Clotilda and a chief. Accounts also refer to Charlie Poteet as a chief. Their medicine man was named Jabez, or Jaba. Charles Lewis (Oluale was his Yoruba name) and his future wife Maggie were also among the Africans on the Clotilda. Cudjoe Lewis lived until 1935 and until 2019 was thought to be the last survivor of the original group. He was a spokesman for the community and was interviewed by early 20th-century writers Emma Langdon Roche and Zora Neale Hurston, among others, who both relied on his accounts for the history of the capture, voyage and community.

In the post-Civil War and emancipation period, the people in Africatown were joined by people from the same ethnic groups who were living in the Mobile area. They gathered as a community to live independently and evade supervision by whites. The community had two major sections: the first and larger one, of about 50 acres, and a second section of about 7 acres, located about two miles west. The latter area was called Lewis Quarters after founder Charlie Oluale Lewis and his wife Maggie.

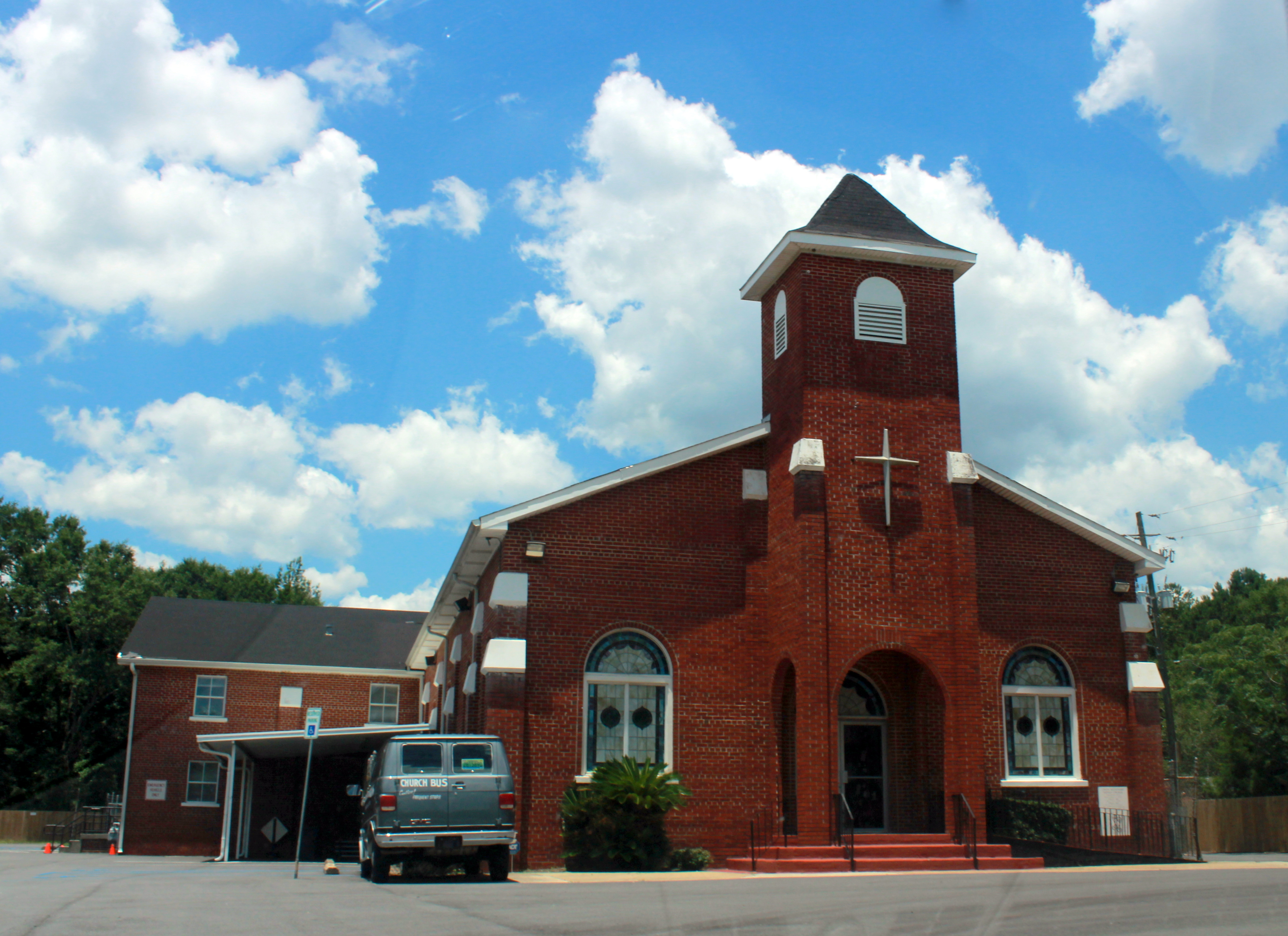
Historic Union Missionary Baptist Church

Cudjo Lewis's son Joe (Joseph) learned to read and write at the church which the settlers founded in Africatown. He helped preserve the story of his father and the Clotilda, as did the families and later community schools, through oral histories. The women raised and sold crops, and the men worked in mills for $1 a day, saving money to purchase the land from Meaher. When possible, they avoided white people.

They established the African Church, later known as the Old Landmark Church. In 1876, they opened the Old Plateau Cemetery, also known as the Africatown Graveyard. In the early 20th century, they replaced the old church with the brick Union Missionary Baptist Church, which is still in use.

The community started its first public school in 1880; it is known as the Mobile County Technical School.

Cudjoe Lewis helped his fellow Africans to adapt to their new country, although they had been badly treated by whites. For decades, he served as a spokesman for the people of Africatown. He was visited by American writers Emma Langdon Roche and Zora Neale Hurston, and educator Booker T. Washington, president of Tuskegee Institute. Roche published a book in 1914 about American slavery and the Africatown community. In 1927, Hurston interviewed Cudjo Lewis for the Journal of Negro History. Although she never published the article, she made a short film about him. She returned later and frequently visited Lewis over a period of three months. She wrote a book about this experience and Lewis's life but was unable to get it published. Her book was posthumously published as Barracoon: The Story of the Last "Black Cargo", in an annotated edition in May 2018.

During interviews, Lewis would tell about the civil wars in West Africa, in which members of the losing side were sold into slavery to Africans and Europeans. His were Takpa people, who had lived in a village in the interior. Cudjo related how he and others from his village had been captured by warriors from neighboring Dahomey, taken to Ouidah and imprisoned within a large slave compound. They were sold by the King of Dahomey to Foster and transported to the U.S. on the Clotilda. After the Civil War and emancipation, the people asked the U.S. government to repatriate them to Africa, but they were refused.

The community developed along the spine of Telegraph Road in the early 20th century, becoming known both as Plateau, for its high ground, and Magazine. Those areas became part of the cities of Mobile and Prichard, respectively. Considerable company housing was built in Prichard for workers at the shipyards and paper mills.

=== Post-World War II changes ===
Up until World War II, Africatown survived as a distinct community, but later it was absorbed as a neighborhood of Mobile. It was also known as Plateau.

The Cudjo Lewis Memorial Statue was placed in front of the Union Missionary Baptist Church in 1959, in recognition of his leadership in the community. In 1977 the Association for the Study of Afro-American Life and History, in cooperation with the Amoco Foundation, gave a bronze plaque to the City of Mobile to commemorate the life of Lewis. It was installed in Bienville Square downtown.

Africatown expanded as newcomers arrived to work in the paper mills of International Paper (IP) and Scott Paper. In this period, the population reached a peak of 12,000. But it declined later in the 20th century, following the closing of the major industries.

In 1997, descendants and friends founded the AfricaTown Mobilization Project to campaign for the community to be designated as an historic district and to promote its redevelopment. The Africatown Historic District was added to the National Register of Historic Places on December 4, 2012.

In 2010, Neil Norman of the College of William and Mary conducted an archeological excavation and preservation project in Africatown. It was funded by local and state agencies. He excavated three homesites of former enslaved people trafficked on the Clotilda: Peter Lee, Cudjo Kazoola Lewis, and Charlie Lewis. They identified some artifacts that may have been brought from Africa. In 2012, there was clean-up work in the newly designated historic district, and the cemetery was cleaned and restored. Also, a large historical marker has been installed outside the cemetery that explains its history and significance.

About 2,000 people live there in 2018, including 100 known descendants of survivors of Clotilda. Among the descendants of Charles Lewis and his wife Maggie, who was also born in Africa, is a great-great-great grandson Ahmir Khalib Thompson, the 21st-century drummer and music producer known as Questlove. Born in Philadelphia, Pennsylvania, he is descended from their son Joseph and his wife.

== Africatown Historic District ==
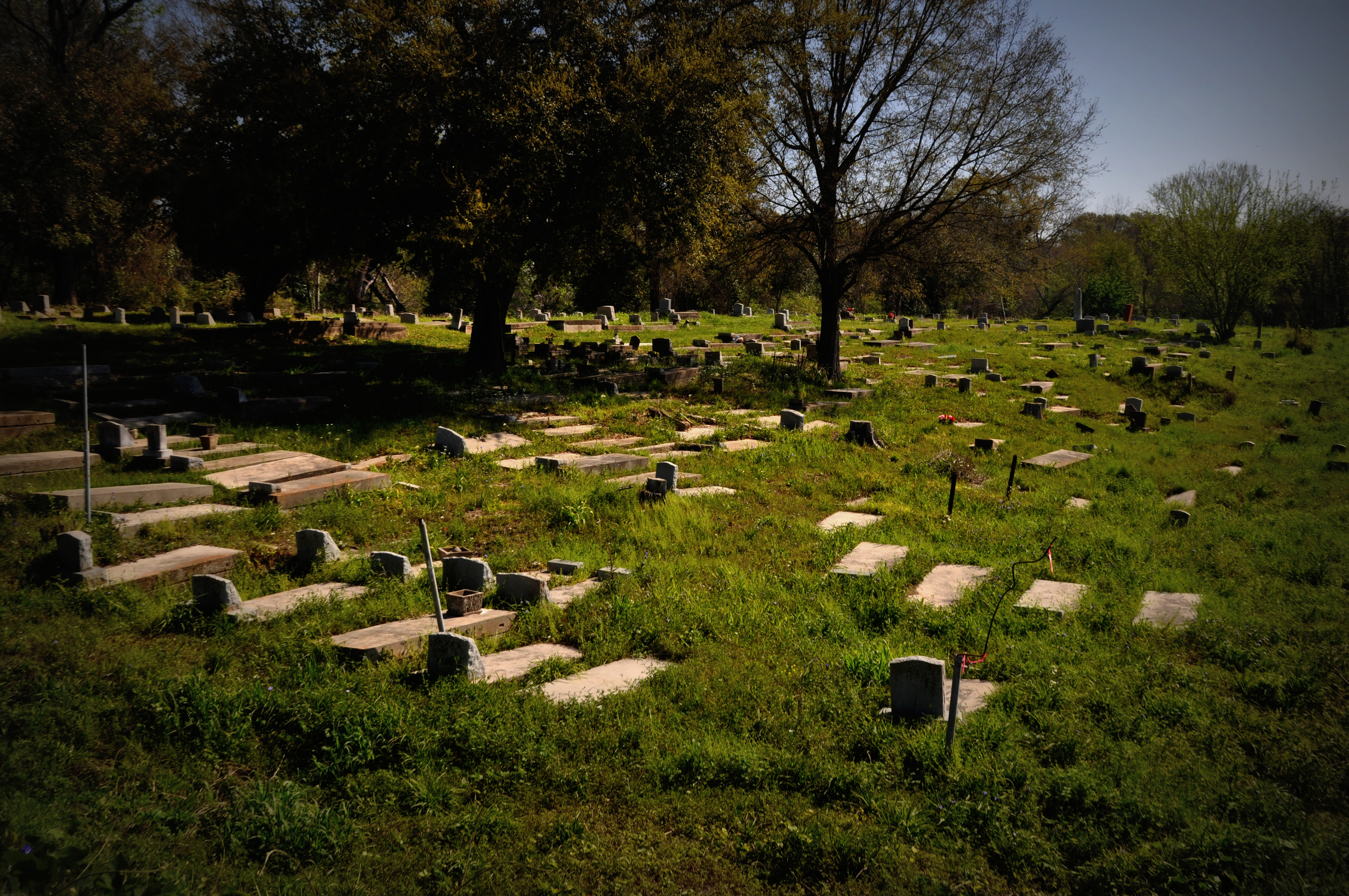
Old Plateau Cemetery, or Africatown Graveyard

Most of the community now lies within Mobile's city limits. Its people passed down the story of its founders and how they were brought to the United States, preserving their history through families, the church, and schools.

Part of the community's land was appropriated by the government for the development of the western approach of the Cochrane-Africatown USA Bridge, completed in 1992. In 1997, descendants and friends formed the Africatown Community Mobilization Project to seek recognition of an Africatown Historic District and encourage the restoration and development of the town site. In 2000 it submitted documentation as a Local Legacy Project to the Library of Congress, through Representative Sonny Callahan from Alabama's 1st congressional district. "Materials include[d] 16 pages of text, 11 color photographs, a map of the AfricaTown district, newspaper articles, information on the AfricaTown Mobilization Project, and a videotape, "AfricaTown, USA," made by a local news station."

Defined as roughly bounded by Jakes Lane, Paper Mill and Warren roads, and Chin and Railroad streets, the historic district was designated in 2009 as a site on Mobile's African American Heritage Trail. The Africatown Historic District was subsequently affirmed as significant by the state and the National Park Service, and it was listed on the National Register of Historic Places on December 4, 2012.

== 2017 pollution lawsuit ==
Given its location along waterways, this area was developed for mills and other industrial uses, especially in the early 20th century. A paper plant was built in 1928 and operated for decades on land first owned by A. Meaher Jr. on the edge of Africatown. Residents say they have a serious industrial pollution and public health problem, which has caused a high rate of cancer since the late 20th century.

In 2017, a group of about 1,200 residents launched a lawsuit against International Paper (IP), as this company had owned the now-shuttered paper plant. The environmental group claim that IP's improper handling of waste through the decades contaminated the land and water, and the company did not clean up the site as required after closing the plant.

== Discovery of the wreck of the Clotilda ==
In January 2018, reporter Ben Raines found the charred remains of a ship that he thought might prove to be the Clotilda. On March 5, 2018, Raines announced that the wreck he had discovered was likely not the Clotilda as the wreckage appeared to be "simply too big, with a significant portion hidden beneath mud and deep water".

A few weeks later, Ben Raines and a team from the University of Southern Mississippi returned to the river and performed the first ever modern survey of the 12 Mile Island section of the Mobile River. One week later, Raines and Monty Graham, head of Marine Sciences at the University of Southern Mississippi, explored several of the 11 wrecks identified in the survey, along with Joe Turner and a team from Underwater Works Dive Shop. On April 13, the team pulled up the first piece of Clotilda to see the light of day in 160 years. The coordinates and survey data were shared with the Alabama Historical Commission, which hired Search Inc., to verify the find. The discovery was kept secret for a year, until the verification process was complete. On May 22, 2019, the Alabama Historical Commission announced that the wreckage of the Clotilda had been found in the Mobile River near Africatown.

== Representation in other media ==
In 2020, Alabama author Beth Duke featured Africatown in her novel Tapestry, which won a Southern Fiction medal from Publishers Weekly. "Tapestry incorporates important African-American history everyone should learn and remember. I urge people to read this book and visit the places it introduces, testaments to the strength and resilience of our ancestors,” said Frazine Taylor, President of the Elmore County Association of Black Heritage, Chair of the Black Heritage Council of the Alabama Historical Commission and President of the Alabama Historical Association

- A local Mobile TV news program produced a program, "AfricaTown, USA", about the settlement and its history.
- In Henry Louis Gates Jr.'s Finding Your Roots, Season 4, Episode 9: "Southern Roots", December 12, 2017, he showed census data for Mobile and Captain William Foster's journal from the Clotilda, as part of explaining the family history of Questlove, a drummer and producer, head of The Roots. His 3× great-grandparents Charles Lewis (b. c. 1820) and his wife Maggie (b. 1830), listed in the 1880 census as born in Africa, were among the captives brought from West Africa on the slave ship Clotilda. Gates also discussed an article from The Tarboro Southerner, which reported on July 14, 1860, that 110 Africans had arrived in Mobile on Clotilda. A Pittsburgh Post article of April 15, 1894, recounted the "wager" that Captain Timothy Meaher made in 1859 – that he could smuggle in "a cargo" within two years, which he accomplished in 1860.
- Natalie S. Robertson's book The Slave Ship Clotilda and the Making of AfricaTown, U.S.A.: Spirit of Our Ancestors is the only comprehensive work that identifies the West African geographical and cultural origins of the Clotilda Africans. Robertson's book, which began as her doctoral dissertation entitled “The African Ancestry Of The Founders Of AfricaTown, Alabama" (published in 1996), is based upon 15 years of transatlantic research that was funded by the National Endowment for the Humanities, Stanley-UI Foundation, PASALA (Project for the Study of Art and Life in Africa), the CIC-Mellon Award, and the UNCF-Mellon Award (through Spelman College).
- Zora Neale Hurston's book Barracoon: The Story of the Last "Black Cargo", edited and with an introduction by Deborah G. Plant, New York: Amistad Press (HarperCollins), was published May 2018.
- On The Media produced a podcast episode where they interviewed residents of Africatown, descendants of captives of the slave ship Clotilda, and other historians.
- The Extinction Tapes, a 2019 documentary made for BBC Radio 4, argued that the discovery of the wreck of the Clotilda was only possible due to the 2006 extinction by pollution of the Alabama pigtoe river mussel (Pleurobema johannis), whose filter-feeding would have otherwise ensured the wreck remained buried in silt. The program's presenter, Rob Newman, also contended that the 20th century decline of the mussel should have been treated as a warning for the looming health crisis of Africatown's human population, due to filter-feeding species' status as barometers of water cleanliness.
- Descendant, a 2022 Netflix documentary, tells the story of activists in Africatown, a Black community in Alabama, as they fight to reclaim their history.

== See also ==
- Atlantic slave trade
- History of Mobile, Alabama
- National African American Archives and Museum
