= Africatown Heritage House =

Community building in Mobile, Alabama, US

Coordinates: 30°44′18″N 88°03′31″W

Africatown Heritage House is a community building in Mobile, Alabama, that houses "Clotilda: The Exhibition" about the survivors and descendants of slaves transported on the Clotilda, the United States' last known slave ship, many of whom established Africatown.

== History ==
The project began in 2020 by the History Museum of Mobile in consultations with the Africantown community after remnants of the Clotilda were discovered in 2019. With the partnerships of the Alabama Historical Commission, Mobile county and city, a new building was commissioned. In early 2023, it was named one of National Geographic UK's best new museums in the US. The exhibition opened to the public in July 2023.
