= Bienville Square =

City park in Mobile, Alabama

Coordinates: 30°41′32″N 88°02′33″W

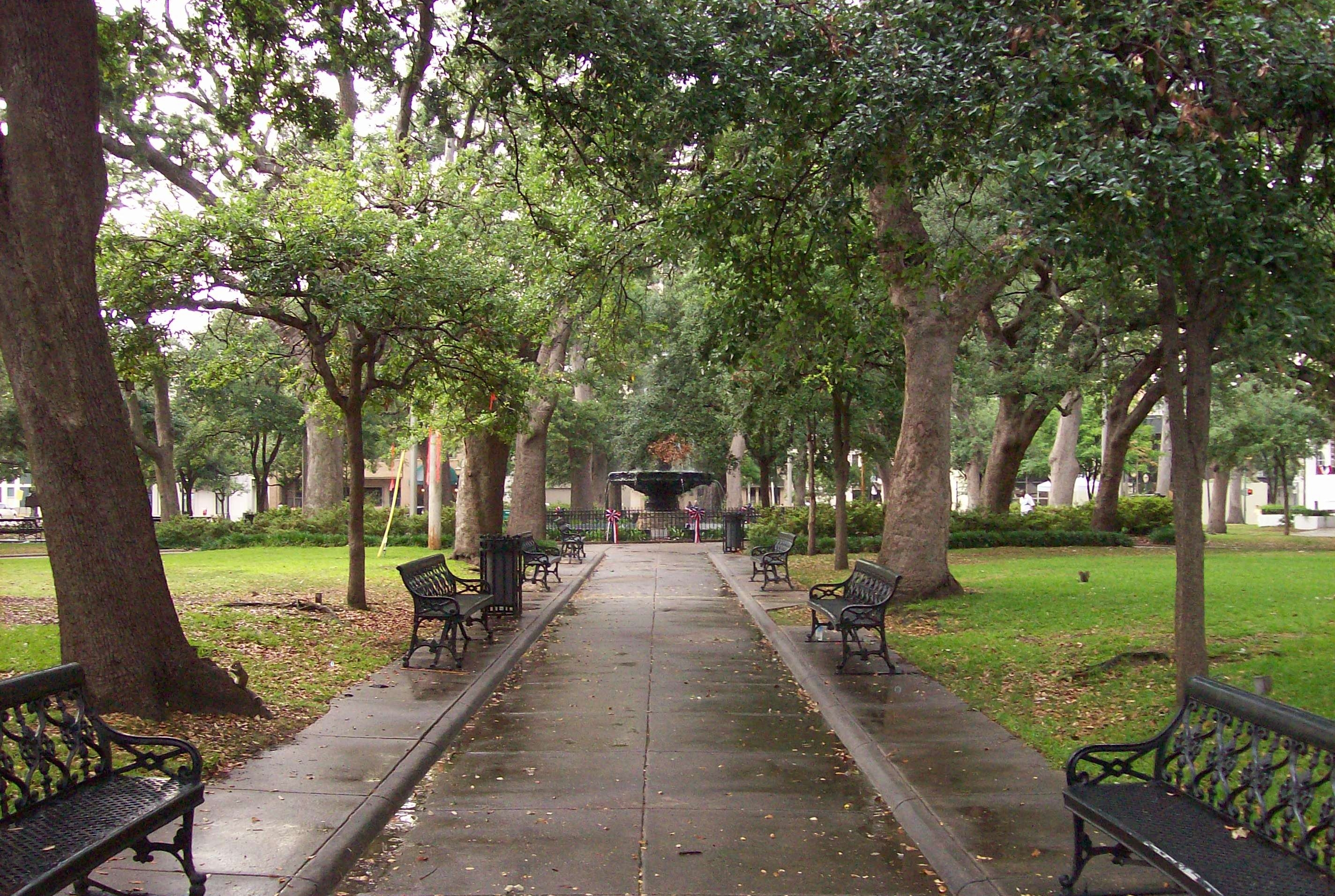
- Bienville Square from Dauphin Street in 2008.
- Interactive map of Bienville Square
- Type: Public park
- Location: Mobile, Alabama
- Area: 1 city block
- Created: 1850
- Operator: The City of Mobile
- Open: All year

Bienville Square is a historic city park in the center of downtown Mobile, Alabama. Bienville Square was named for Mobile's founder, Jean-Baptiste Le Moyne, Sieur de Bienville. It takes up the entire block bordered by the streets of Dauphin, Saint Joseph, Saint Francis, and North Conception.

== History ==
Bienville Square had its beginnings as a public park in 1824 when the United States Congress passed an act that transferred a large plot of land to the city of Mobile and specified that the property be forever used as a city park. This plot had been the site of the old Spanish Hospital on the southwestern corner of the block, at the corner of Dauphin Street and North Conception Street. The city began buying the other lots in the block in 1834 and, by 1849, held title to the entire block.

The May 30, 1869 edition of the Mobile Register gives a short history of the square:

For thirty years of more Bienville Square-- the public square as it was called for two thirds of that time-has had an existence, but in its neglected state, a receptacle of trash and a lair for vagabonds, it was an absolute nuisance until it was put into its present condition through the energy, good taste and liberal judgement of Lewis T. Woodruff. Bienville Square as it is, is his creation, and he never ceased to feel an interest in its being properly cared for.

The square was a primary gathering place for residents of the city from the 1850s to the 1940s. By the late 1960s, however, Bienville Square had become rundown as the city lost population to the suburbs in the postwar housing developments. With the revival of downtown starting in the 1980s, the city renewed the square and its popularity increased.

In September 2020, Hurricane Sally badly damaged a number of the large trees in the square, creating open sky, where a green, shady canopy once was.

== Notable events ==
Theodore Roosevelt spoke in the square in 1905 about the importance of the Panama Canal to the port of Mobile. It was the site of many mass meetings by shipyard workers from Alabama Drydock and Shipbuilding Company during World War II as the company experienced labor disputes.

== Features ==
In the 1850s walkways, a cast-iron fence (since removed), and benches were added here. Live oak trees were planted to provide shade. In the 1890s, the large cast iron fountain with an acanthus leaf motif was added to the center of the square. A new bandstand with public restrooms was donated to the park in 1941 by the Sears and Roebuck Company to replace one from the Victorian era.

In 1977 the Association for the Study of Afro-American Life and History, in cooperation with the Amoco Foundation, gave a bronze plaque to the City of Mobile to commemorate the life of Cudjo Lewis, the last survivor of Clotilda, the last known slave ship, and a founding resident of Africatown in north Mobile. The plaque was installed in Bienville Square.

A plaque is installed near the northwest corner of the park honoring the city's founder D’Iberville, the first governor of Louisiana and elder brother to Bienville.

An historic marker at the Square's Northwest corner commemorates the Salvation Army.

A large granite cross near the southern edge of the park honors Bienville, the younger of the two Le Moyne brothers who settled Mobile, and the second governor of Louisiana.

The Africatown Historic District was added to the National Register of Historic Places in 2012. (In January 2018, Ben Raines of al.com reported that he may have found the wreckage of Clotilda, which was burned and sunk in the river north of Mobile. Excavation and many studies will be required to confirm that.)

== Activities ==
The square is used for many of the city's cultural functions:

- Jazz in Bienville by the Gulf Coast Ethnic and Heritage Jazz Festival.
- The annual Lighting of the Trees celebration and the lighting of Mobile's official Christmas tree.
- Kids Day in Bienville Square.
- The square is the epicenter for Mobile's annual Bayfest Music Festival.
