= Meaher State Park =

State park in Baldwin County, Alabama, United States

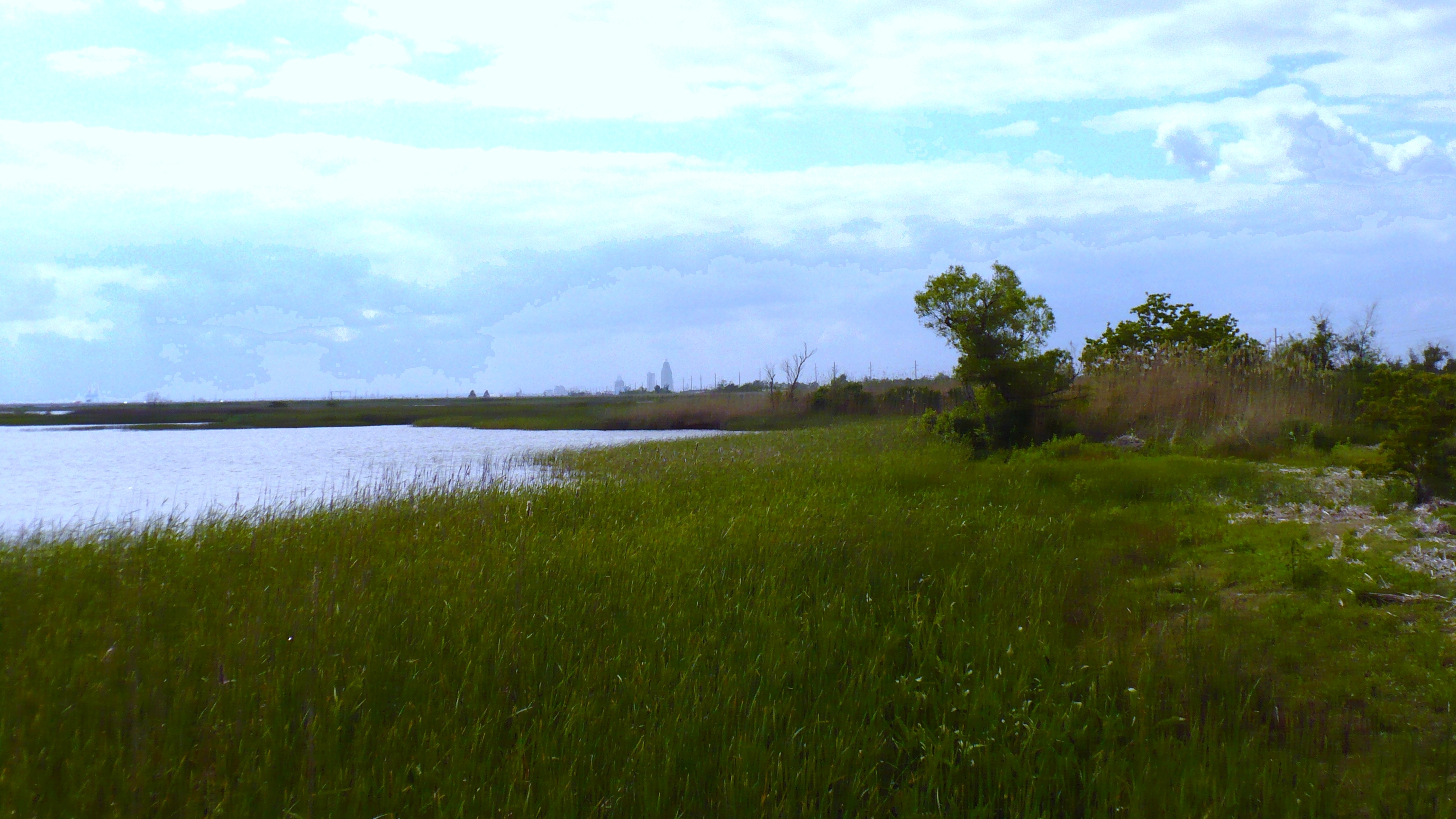
- Wetlands at Meaher State Park

- Location within Alabama
- Location: Spanish Fort, Alabama, United States
- Coordinates: 30°40′11″N 87°56′9″W
- Area: 1,327 acres (537 ha)
- Elevation: 3 ft (0.91 m)
- Established: 1989
- Administrator: Alabama Department of Conservation and Natural Resources
- Website: Official website

Meaher State Park is a public recreation area located on Big Island, an island at the north end of Mobile Bay that lies within the city limits of Spanish Fort, Alabama. The state park occupies 1,327 acres (537 ha) along the shoreline of Ducker Bay, at the junction of Mobile Bay and the Mobile-Tensaw River Delta. It is surrounded by wetlands of the Mobile Bay estuary. The park is accessed from Battleship Parkway, known locally as the "Causeway," and is managed by Alabama Department of Conservation and Natural Resources.

== History ==
The park opened in 1989. The land was donated to the state for public recreational use by Augustine Meaher, for whom the park is named. Augustine Meaher was a descendant of Timothy Meaher, who illegally smuggled 110 African men, women, and children into Mobile Bay on the schooner Clotilda in 1860. He was charged with smuggling but was not convicted.

== Awards ==
In September 2020, Meaher State Park was one of eleven Alabama state parks awarded Tripadvisor’s Traveler's Choice Award, which recognizes businesses and attractions that earn consistently high user reviews.

== Activities and amenities ==
The park features an interpretive boardwalk through the wetlands, picnic area, boat ramp, kayak launch, 300 foot fishing pier, eight cabins, and a camping area with 118 individual campsites.
