= HMS Saracen (1831) =

Brig-sloop of the Royal Navy

History

United Kingdom
- Name: HMS Saracen
- Builder: Plymouth Dockyard
- Launched: 30 January 1831
- Fate: Sold out of the service in 1862

General characteristics
- Class & type: Cherokee-class brig-sloop
- Tons burthen: 230 64/94 bm
- Length: 90 ft (27.4 m) (gundeck); 72 ft 3 in (22.0 m) (keel)
- Beam: 24 ft 8 in (7.5 m)
- Draught: 9 ft 6 in (2.9 m)
- Depth: 11 ft (3.4 m)
- Sail plan: Brig
- Complement: 52
- Armament: 2 × 6-pdr cannon; 8 × 18-pdr carronades

HMS Saracen was a Cherokee-class brig-sloop of the Royal Navy. Launched 30 January 1831 at the Plymouth Dockyard, at Plymouth, England, this vessel held a gun deck of eight 18-Pounder carronades and two 6-Pounder bow chasers. She also held a crew complement of 75. Henry Worsley Hill served as her commander starting on 15 March 1841.

Saracen was part of the West Africa Squadron, involved in anti-slavery operations against the Atlantic slave trade from west Africa to the Americas. A list of captures of slave trade ships include:

- 15 June 1839 The slaver Golupohick, under charge of Lieutenant Rowlett, and another slaver ship, one of which had 290 slaves on board, the other empty. Both were condemned.
- 31 March 1839 While patrolling the Rio Pongas, the Portuguese slave schooner Lavradora / Labradora, with 245 slaves on board, was sentenced to be condemned.
- 16 October 1839 Detained off Gallinas River, the Portuguese slave schooner Brilhante, was sentenced to be condemned.
- 1 March 1840 The slave schooner Sénégambie was detained and has been condemned by the Vice Admiralty Court, however she is reported to be unfit for H.M. service and was therefore unsuitable as a replacement ship.
- 21 July 1840 Detained off the Gallinas River, the Spanish slave brigantine Diana, which may also have been known as Anna, was condemned on 8 September 1840.
- 17 August 1840 Detained off the Gallinas River, the Spanish slave vessel Sirena, was condemned on 8 September 1840.
- October 1840 120 seamen and marines from the Wanderer and Saracen entered the village of Dombocorro with a view to obtaining, by treaty, the release of the slaves held by slavers in the district, under the control of Chief Siacca, and the burning of all eight slave factories.
- 9 December 1840 Detained off Seabar, River Sherbro, the Spanish slave schooner Boa Uniao, was condemned on 1 February 1841.
- 11 December 1840 Detained off Seabar, River Sherbro, the Spanish slave schooner San Paolo de Loando, was condemned on 1 February 1841.
- 19 January 1841 Detained off Seabar, River Sherbro the United States slave schooner Urraca, was condemned on 23 February 1841.
- 7 February 1841 Detained in the slave vessel Augusta, was condemned on 31 March 1841.
- 22 February 1841 Detained after a brief resistance off Sea Bar, Sherbro Island the Spanish slave brig Republicano, was condemned on 6 April 1841.
- 24 February 1841, Lieutenant Henry Worsley Hill, at anchor off Sea Bar, had been advised by a "Krooman" named Sea Breeze that he had been beaten, put in irons, and confined in a barracoon. Two barracoons, capable of containing 500 Africans, indicated an extensive slave trading establishment. Slaves, hoping to take advantage of the opportunity of going to Sierra Leone, brought with them a canoe from a nearby creek, containing women and children, making a total of 51 persons. They set fire to the barracoon, and requested Lieutenant Hill protect them.
- 19 April 1841 The slaver Goluptchick, was captured again on the coast of Africa, this time under the name of Augusta.

The Saracen was later remembered in a postage stamp from Ascension Island.
