= Cudjoe Lewis =

One of the last known survivors of the Atlantic slave trade (d. 1935)

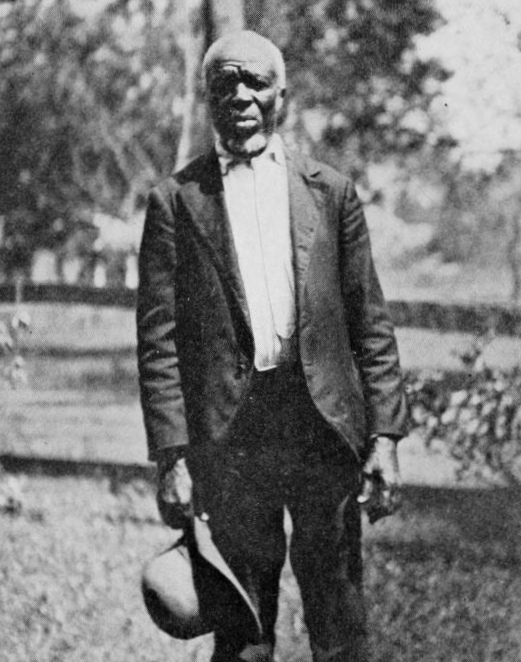
- Lewis c. 1914
- Born: Oluale Kossola c. 1841; Bantè, current-day Benin
- Died: July 17, 1935 (aged 94/95); Africatown, Mobile, Alabama, US
- Occupations: Farmer, laborer, church sexton
- Known for: survivor of the Atlantic slave trade between Africa and the Americas

Cudjoe Kazoola Lewis (c. 1841 – July 17, 1935), born Oluale Kossola, and also known as Cudjo Lewis, was the third-to-last adult survivor of the Atlantic slave trade between Africa and the Americas. (Note: Redoshi, another captive on the Clotilda, was sold to a planter in Dallas County, Alabama, where she became known also as Sally Smith. She married, had a daughter, and lived to 1937 in Bogue Chitto. She is considered the last survivor of the Clotilda.) Together with 115 other African captives, he was brought to the United States on board the ship Clotilda in 1860. The captives were landed in backwaters of the Mobile River near Mobile, Alabama, and hidden from authorities. The ship was scuttled to evade discovery, and remained undiscovered until May 2019.

After the Civil War and emancipation, Lewis and other members of the Clotilda group became free. A number of them founded a community at Magazine Point, north of Mobile, Alabama. They were joined there by others born in Africa. Now designated as the Africatown Historic District, the community was added to the National Register of Historic Places in 2012.

In old age Kossola preserved the experiences of the Clotilda captives by providing accounts of the history of the group to visitors, including Mobile artist and author Emma Langdon Roche and author and folklorist Zora Neale Hurston. He lived to 1935 and was long thought to be the last survivor of the Clotilda, until historian Hannah Durkin identified two longer-lived Clotilda survivors, who made the voyage as children: Redoshi, who died in 1937, and Matilda McCrear, who died in 1940.

== Early life and enslavement ==
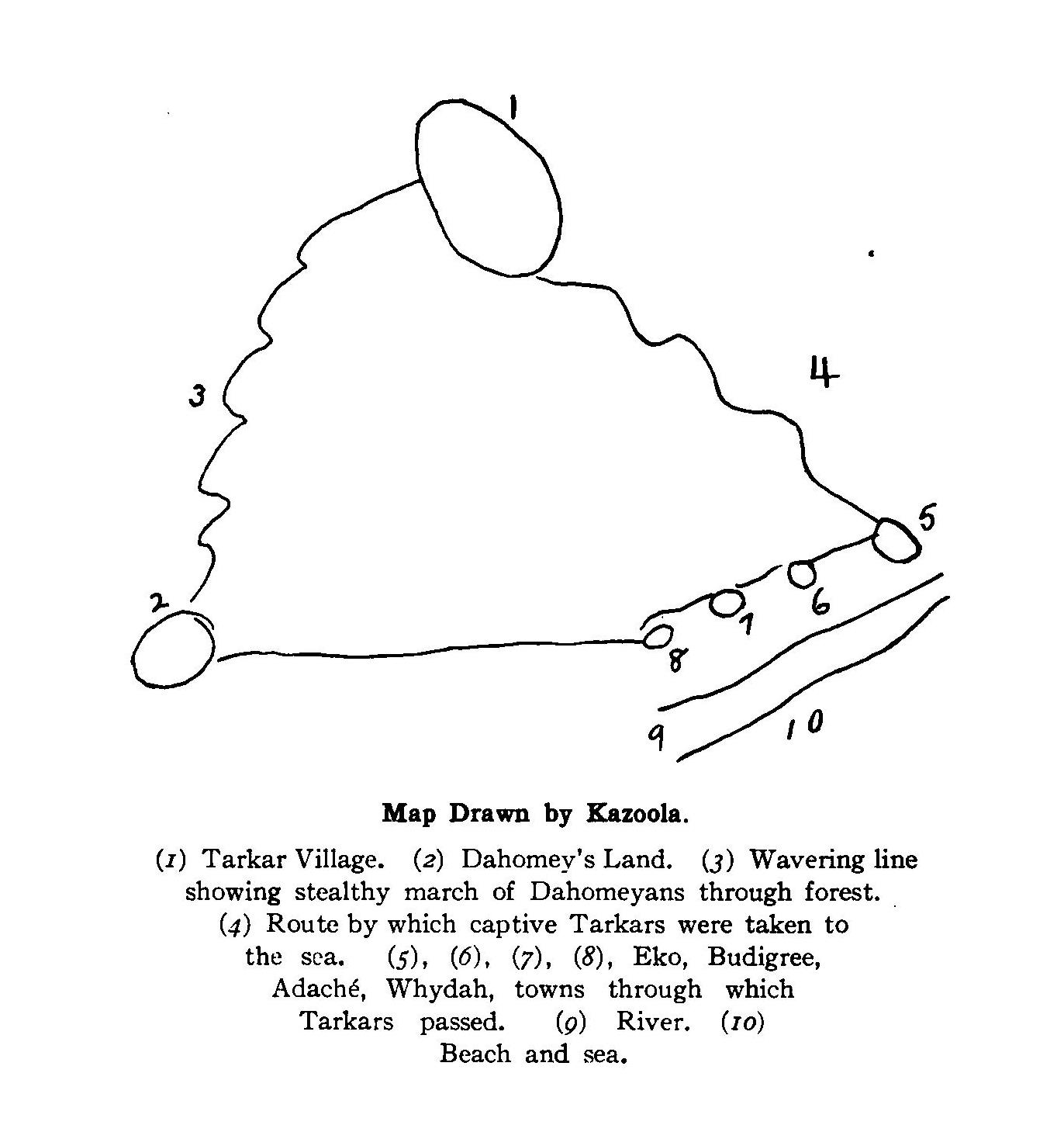
A map drawn by Lewis to illustrate his capture

He was born as Kossola or Oluale Kossola (Americans would later transcribe his given name as "Kazoola"), around 1841 in West Africa. Analyzing names and the other words attributed to the Africatown founders, historian Sylviane Diouf has concluded that he and most other members of the Africatown community belonged to the Yoruba people from the Banté region of Benin. Lewis's father was Oluwale (or Oluale) and his mother Fondlolu; he had five full siblings and twelve half-siblings through his father's other two wives.

Interviewers Emma Langdon Roche and Zora Neale Hurston, and those who used their work, referred to Lewis and his fellow-captives as "Tarkars," based on his account. Diouf believes that the term "Tarkar" might have come from a misunderstanding of the name of their local king, or the name of their village.

In April or May 1860, his village was attacked and Lewis was taken prisoner by female warriors led by King Glele of Dahomey, during an annual dry-season raid for slaves. Along with other captives, he was taken to the slaving port of Ouidah and sold to Captain William Foster of the Clotilda, an American ship recently built in Mobile, Alabama, and owned by businessman Timothy Meaher. The importation of slaves into the United States had been illegal since 1808, but slaves were still routinely smuggled in from Spanish Cuba.

Some reports allege that Meaher fully intended to break the law, and that he had bet a businessman $1,000 that he could successfully evade the prohibition on the Atlantic slave trade. In a similar situation, the owners of the Wanderer, which had illegally brought enslaved people to Georgia in 1858, were indicted and tried for piracy in a U.S. Federal court in Savannah in May 1860, but were acquitted by the jury.

By the time the Clotilda reached the Mississippi coast in July 1860, the United States Federal Government had been alerted to its activities, and Timothy Meaher, his brother Burns, and their associate John Dabney were arrested and charged with illegal possession of the captives. However, there was a gap of almost five months between the end of July 1860, when summonses and writs of seizure were issued against the Meahers and Dabney, and mid-December when they received them. During the intervening period the captives were dispersed and hidden, and without their physical presence as evidence, the case was dismissed in January 1861.

Until the end of the Civil War (1861–65), Lewis and his fellows lived as de facto slaves of Meaher, his brothers, or their associates. Lewis was purchased by James Meaher, for whom he worked as a deckhand on a steamer. During this time he became known as "Cudjo Lewis." He later explained that he suggested "Cudjo," a day-name commonly given to boys born on a Monday, as an alternative to his given name when James Meaher had difficulty pronouncing "Kossola."

The name "Cudjo" sounds similar to "Kodjoe", a popular name in Ghana, where it is also given to those born on Monday. Cudjoe or Kudzo is the alternative name, besides Kodzo, given to male children among the Gbe-speaking tribes stretching from southeastern Ghana to southwestern Nigeria. His captors were Fon, a branch of that language cluster. Historian Diouf posits that the surname "Lewis" was a corruption of his father's name Oluale, sharing the "lu" sound; in his homeland, the closest analog to what speakers of American English understood as a surname would have been a patronymic.

== Life in Africatown ==
=== Establishment of Africatown ===
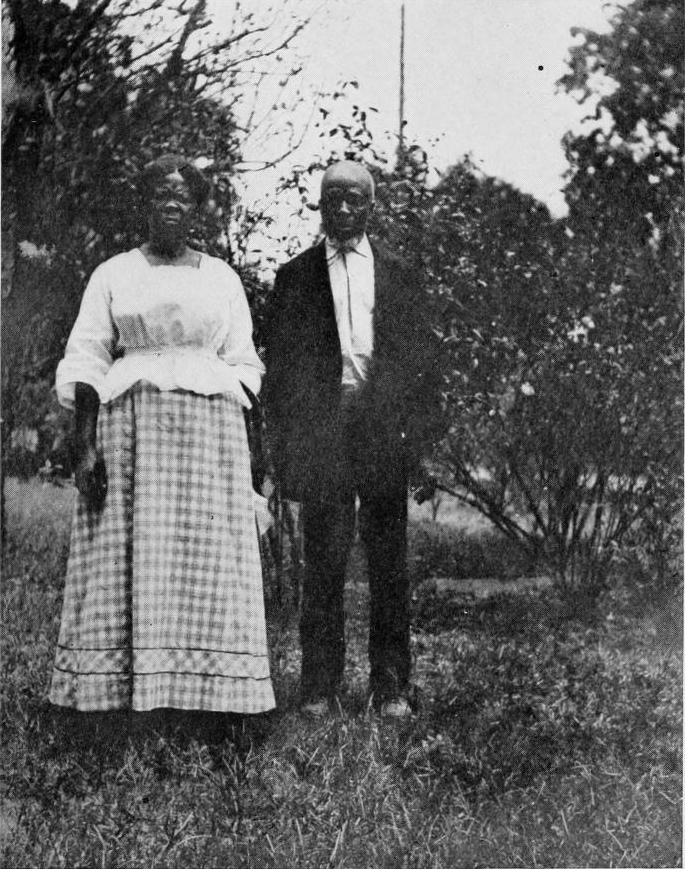
Lewis and fellow Clotilda survivor Abaché (Clara Turner) c. 1914. By then there were eight surviving members of the Clotilda group.

During their time in slavery, Lewis and many of the other Clotilda captives were located at an area north of Mobile known as Magazine Point, the Plateau, or "Meaher's hammock," where the Meahers owned a mill and a shipyard. Although only three miles (five kilometers) from the town of Mobile, it was isolated, separated from the city by a swamp and a forest, and easily accessible only by water.

After the abolition of slavery and the end of the Civil War, the Clotilda captives tried to raise money to return to their homeland. The men worked in lumber mills and the women raised and sold produce, but they could not acquire sufficient funds. After realizing that they would not be able to return to Africa, the group deputized Lewis to ask Timothy Meaher for a grant of land. When he refused, the members of the community continued to raise money and began to purchase land around Magazine Point. On September 30, 1872, Lewis bought about 2 acres (0.8 hectares) of land in the Plateau area for $100.00 (~$2,688 in 2025).

They developed Africatown as a self-contained, independent black community. The group appointed leaders to enforce communal norms derived from their shared African background. They also developed institutions including a church, a school, and a cemetery. Diouf explains that Africatown was unique because it was both a "black town," inhabited exclusively by people of African ancestry, and an enclave of people born in another country. She writes, "Black towns were safe havens from racism, but African Town was a refuge from Americans."

Writing in 1914, Emma Langdon Roche noted that the surviving founders of Africatown preferred to speak in their own language among themselves. She described the English of adults as "very broken and not always intelligible even to those who have lived among them for many years." However, the residents also adopted some American customs, including Christianity. Lewis converted in 1869, joining a Baptist church.

=== Marriage and family life ===
During the mid-1860s Lewis established a common-law relationship with another Clotilda survivor, Abile (Americanized as "Celia"). They formally married on March 15, 1880, along with several other couples from Africatown. They remained together until Abile's death in 1905.

They had six children, five sons and a daughter, to each of whom they gave both an African name and an American name. Their eldest son, Aleck (or Elick) Iyadjemi (which translated from Yorùbá means "I suffered"), became a grocer; he took his wife to live in a house on his father's land. Diouf describes this arrangement as a Yorùbá -style "family compound." Another son, Cudjoe Feïchtan, was fatally shot by a black sheriff's deputy in 1902. Lewis outlived his wife and all of his children. He allowed his daughter-in-law Mary Wood Lewis, his grandchildren and eventually her second husband Joe Lewis (no relation) to remain in their house in the compound.

Lewis worked as a farmer and laborer until 1902, when his buggy was damaged and he was injured in a collision with a train in Mobile. As he was unable to work at heavy labor, the community appointed him as sexton of the church. In 1903 it took the name of the Union Missionary Baptist Church.

=== Participation in American institutions ===
Although native-born American former slaves became citizens upon the passage of the Fourteenth Amendment to the United States Constitution in July 1868, this change in status did not apply to the members of the Clotilda group, who were foreign-born. Cudjo Kazoola Lewis became a naturalized American citizen on October 24, 1868.

Lewis used the American legal system in 1902 after being injured in the buggy-train collision. When the Louisville and Nashville Railroad refused to pay damages, he hired an attorney, sued the railroad, and won a significant settlement of $650.00. The award was overturned on appeal.

== Role as storyteller and historian ==
In the first quarter of the 20th century, Lewis began to serve as an informant for scholars and other writers, sharing the history of the Clotilda Africans, and traditional stories and tales. Emma Langdon Roche, a Mobile-based writer and artist, interviewed Lewis and the other survivors for her 1914 book Historic Sketches of the South. She described their capture in Africa, enslavement, and lives in Africatown. They requested that she use their African names in her work, in the hope that it might reach their homeland "where some might remember them."

By 1925, Lewis was thought to be the last African survivor of the Clotilda; he was interviewed by educator and folklorist Arthur Huff Fauset of Philadelphia. In 1927 Fauset published two of Lewis' animal tales, "T'appin's magic dipper and whip" and "T'appin fooled by Billy Goat's eyes," and "Lion Hunt," his autobiographical account about hunting in Africa, in the Journal of American Folklore.

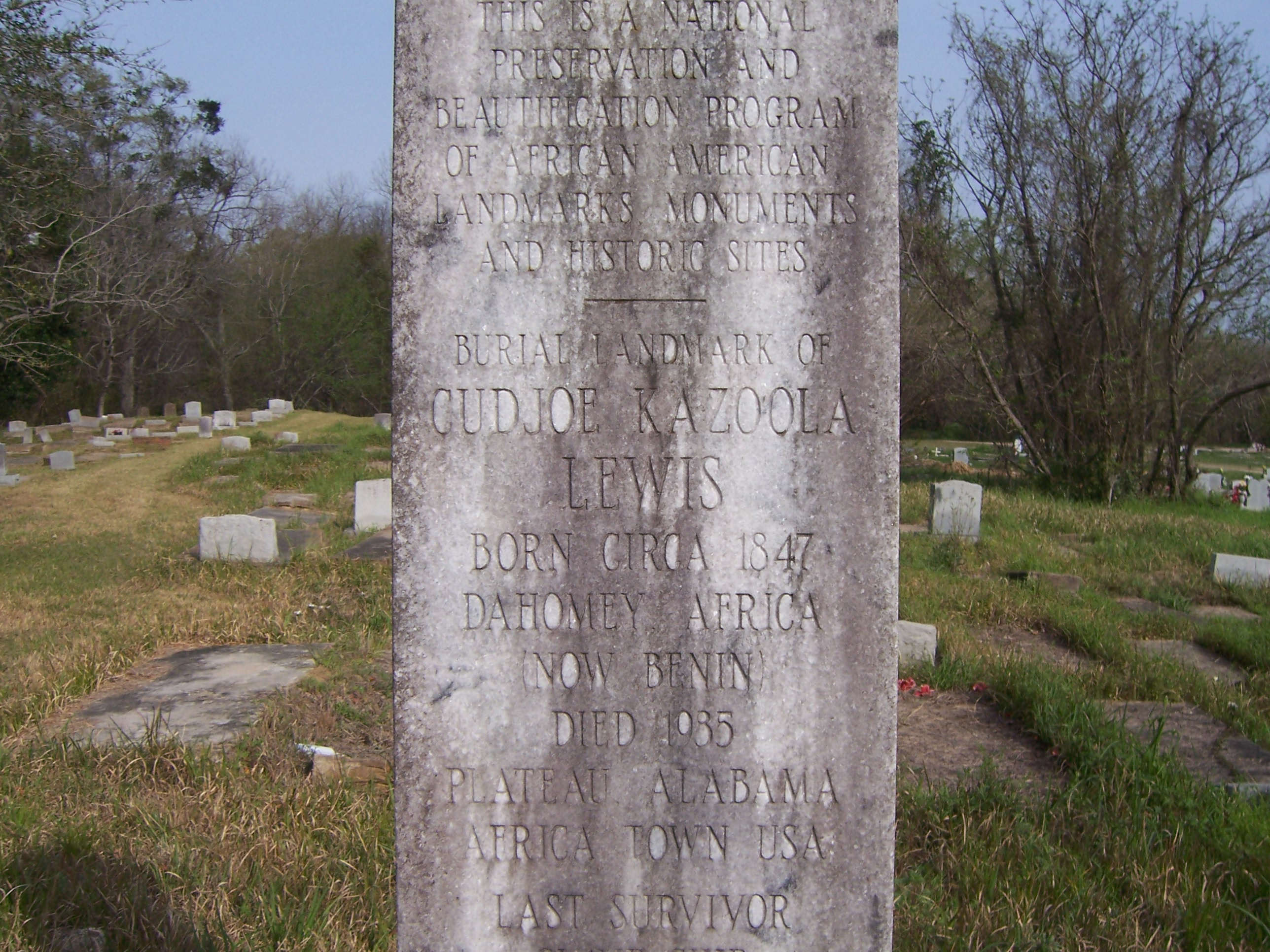
Lewis' commemorative marker in Plateau Cemetery, Africatown

In 1927 Lewis was interviewed by Zora Neale Hurston, then a graduate student in anthropology who became a folklorist. The next year she published an article, "Cudjoe's Own Story of the Last African Slaver" (1928), published in the Journal of Negro History. According to her biographer Robert E. Hemenway, this piece largely plagiarized Emma Roche's work, although Hurston added information about daily life in Lewis's home village of Banté.

In 1928 Hurston returned with additional resources; she conducted more interviews with Kossula, took photographs, and recorded what was thought to be the only known film footage of an African who had been trafficked to the United States through the slave trade (though one other Clotilda survivor, who outlived him, has also been filmed briefly). Based on this material, she wrote a manuscript, Barracoon, which Hemenway described as "a highly dramatic, semifictionalized narrative intended for the popular reader."

After this round of interviews, Hurston's literary patron, philanthropist Charlotte Osgood Mason, learned of Lewis and began to send him money for his support. Lewis was also interviewed by journalists for local and national publications.

Hurston's book Barracoon: The Story of the Last "Black Cargo" was not published until 2018, in an annotated edition.

== Legacy ==
Cudjo Lewis died on July 17, 1935, and was buried at the Plateau Cemetery in Africatown. Since his death, his status as one of the last survivors of the Clotilda, and the written record created by his interviewers, have made him a public figure of the history of the community.

- In 1959 a memorial bust of Lewis was erected in front of Africatown's Union Missionary Baptist Church atop a pyramid of bricks that had been made by the Clotilda captives. It was made on behalf of the Progressive League of Africatown.
- In 1977 the Association for the Study of Negro Life and History (now the Association for the Study of African American Life and History) commemorated Lewis and the Clotilda group.
- Around 1990 the City of Mobile and Mobile alumnae chapter of Delta Sigma Theta sorority erected a commemorative marker for Lewis in the Plateau Cemetery.
- In 2007 two African filmmakers donated a bust of Lewis to the Africatown Welcome Center. It was severely damaged by vandalism in 2011.
- In 2010, archaeologists from the College of William and Mary excavated Lewis' homesite in Africatown, along with those of two other residents, to search for artifacts and evidence of African practices in the founders' daily lives in the United States.
- Barracoon: The Story of the Last "Black Cargo", Zora Neale Hurston's account of Lewis' life, was published for the first time in 2018.
- In 2016, Kazoola Eatery & Entertainment opened in downtown Mobile. The jazz and blues venue serves not only as a tribute to Lewis, but a symbol of cultural unity in the downtown area.

== See also ==
- List of slaves
- List of the last surviving American slaves
- Yoruba Americans
