= Admiral Hill =

Admiral Hill may refer to:

- Harry W. Hill (admiral) (1890–1971), U.S. Navy admiral
- Henry Hill (Royal Navy officer) (1772–1849), British Royal Navy vice admiral
- J. Richard Hill (1929–2017), British Royal Navy rear admiral
- John Hill (Royal Navy officer) (c. 1774–1855), British Royal Navy rear admiral
- Jon A. Hill (born 1963), U.S. Navy vice admiral
- Virgil L. Hill Jr. (born 1938), U.S. Navy rear admiral

== See also ==
- Nicholas Hill-Norton (born 1939), British Royal Navy vice admiral
