= Descendant (2022 film) =

- Netflix release poster
- Directed by: Margaret Brown
- Written by: Margaret Brown; Kern Jackson
- Produced by: Margaret Brown; Kyle Martin; Essie Chambers
- Cinematography: Justin Zweifach; Zac Manuel
- Edited by: Michael Bloch; Geoffrey Richman
- Music by: Ray Angry; Rhiannon Giddens; Dirk Powell
- Production companies: Participant; Night Tide Production; Take One Five Entertainment
- Distributed by: Netflix
- Release dates: January 2022 (Sundance); October 21, 2022
- Running time: 109 minutes
- Country: United States
- Language: English

Descendant is a 2022 American historical documentary film directed by Margaret Brown, chronicling the story behind Africatown in Alabama, and the descendants of the last known enslaved Africans brought to the United States aboard the Clotilda. The film premiered at the 2022 Sundance Film Festival, where it was picked up for wider distribution by Higher Ground Productions and Netflix. It received a theatrical release on October 21, 2022, and was available to stream on Netflix that day as well.

== Synopsis ==
In 1808, the United States passed an act of Congress that abolished the international slave trade, making it illegal to bring slaves across the Atlantic Ocean and back to America. However, in 1860, Timothy Meaher sailed his ship Clotilda to Africa and purchased well over one hundred slaves. On July 9, 1860, 110 African men, women, and children, survived that voyage and were dropped off at the Mobile Bay in Mobile, Alabama. William Foster, the captain, burned the ship and tried to destroy any traces of evidence pertaining to this illegal expedition.

Centuries later, the descendants of the slaves on the Clotilda reside in an area near Mobile now known as Africatown. They have fought for justice and worked to find the Clotilda in the river. The wreckage of the Clotilda was found in 2019 in the Mobile River.

This film explores the community of Africatown and the descendants of some of the last known enslaved Africans that were brought to the United States aboard her 40 years after slave trading had already been made a capital offense.

== Production and release ==
After the wreckage of the Clotilda was discovered, director Margaret Brown spent four years with the residents of Africatown examining how the discovery impacted the lives of descendants of the last known slaves brought to the US. Brown also produced the film alongside Kyle Martin and Essie Chambers for Participant and Take One Five Entertainment. The film premiered at the 2022 Sundance Film Festival, after which it was picked up by Higher Ground Productions and Netflix for theatrical and streaming distribution. It continued on the festival circuit at the SXSW Festival as a Festival Favorite. The film was released to select theaters and on Netflix on October 21, 2022.

== Reception ==
On Rotten Tomatoes the film has an approval rating of 100%, with an average score of 8.4/10, based on 69 reviews. The website's critical consensus reads, "Descendant serves as a fantastically compelling example of how history can be reclaimed -- and a stirring tribute to a resilient community." On Metacritic, it has a weighted average score of 88 out of 100 based on 12 critic reviews, indicating "universal acclaim". Jake Coyle called it "One of the best films of the year" in his review for the Associated Press. In June 2025, IndieWire ranked the film at number 61 on its list of "The 100 Best Movies of the 2020s (So Far)."

=== Accolades ===
Award	Date of ceremony	Category	Recipient(s)	Result	Ref.
Sundance Film Festival	January 30, 2022	US Documentary Special Jury Award: Creative Vision	Descendant	Won	
Critics' Choice Documentary Awards	November 13, 2022	Best Documentary Feature	Descendant	Nominated	
Critics' Choice Documentary Awards	November 13, 2022	Best Historical Documentary	Descendant	Won	
Critics' Choice Documentary Awards	November 13, 2022	Best Director	Margaret Brown	Nominated	
National Board of Review	December 8, 2022	Top 5 Documentaries	Descendant	Won	
Washington D.C. Area Film Critics Association	December 12, 2022	Best Documentary	Descendant	Nominated	
Chicago Film Critics Association	December 14, 2022	Best Documentary Film	Descendant	Nominated	
Florida Film Critics Circle	December 22, 2022	Best Documentary Film	Descendant	Nominated	
Alliance of Women Film Journalists	January 5, 2023	Best Documentary	Descendant	Nominated	
National Society of Film Critics	January 7, 2023	Best Non-Fiction Film	Descendant	Runner-up	
Austin Film Critics Association	January 10, 2023	Best Documentary	Descendant	Nominated	
Austin Film Critics Association	January 10, 2023	Best Austin Film	Descendant	Won	
Cinema Eye Honors	January 12, 2023	Outstanding Direction	Margaret Brown	Nominated	
Cinema Eye Honors	January 12, 2023	Outstanding Original Score	Ray Angry, Rhiannon Giddens and Dirk Powell	Nominated	
Georgia Film Critics Association	January 13, 2023	Best Documentary Film	Descendant	Runner-up	
Black Reel Awards	February 6, 2023	Outstanding Documentary Feature	Descendant	Nominated	
Satellite Awards	February 11, 2023	Best Motion Picture – Documentary	Descendant	Nominated	
Producers Guild of America Awards	February 25, 2023	Outstanding Producer of Documentary Theatrical Motion Pictures	Margaret Brown, Kyle Martin, and Essie Chambers	Nominated	

== Cast ==
[edit]

- Theodore Arthur
- Gary Autrey
- Chris Davis
- Joycelyn Davis
- Willomina Davis
- James Delgado
- Bobby Dennison
- Mary Elliot
- Vivian Davis Figures
- Karlos Finley
- Mike Fitzgerald
- Shiela Flanagan
- Anderson Flen
- Michael Foster
- Patricia Frazier
- Vernetta Henson
- Fredrik T. Hiebert
- Herndon Inge
- Kern Jackson
- Cleon Jones
- Lisa Jones
- Mae Jones
- Annah Lewis
- Ayanna Lewis
- Emmett Lewis
- Rayla Lewis
- Robert Lewis
- Garry Lumbers
- Ralphema Lumbers

== Producers ==
[edit]

- Louis Black as associate producer
- Margaret Brown as producer
- Essie Chambers as producer
- Shawn Gee as executive producer
- Kate Hurwitz as executive producer
- Kern Jackson as co-producer
- Kristen Mann as line producer
- Kyle Martin as producer
- Christine Mattsson as co-executive producer
- Questlove as executive producer
- Jeff Skoll as executive producer
- Tariq Trotter as executive producer
- Diane Weyermann as executive producer
- Zarah Zohlman as executive producer
