= Henry Worsley Hill =

English sailor and administrator (1799–1868)

Henry Worsley Hill (21 May 1799 – 14 October 1868) was a captain in the Royal Navy and Governor of the Gold Coast. He was the eldest son of Vice-Admiral Henry Hill (1775–1849) and Ann Worsley (1779–1805).jou ma

== Biography ==
Hill was born in the village of Freshwater, Isle of Wight, England. Hill was the eldest son of Vice-Admiral Henry Hill (1775–1849) and Ann Worsley (1779–1805). He entered the Royal Navy on 24 March 1810. Promoted to lieutenant on 13 July 1824, he served under his father on HMS Superb starting on 20 December 1825. On 31 March 1826, he remained as a lieutenant under his father on HMS Melville. In January 1828, he was posted to HMS Tribune, serving on the Royal Navy's South American station, and remained in this assignment until December 1831. From 21 September 1833 to 1 January 1834 he was an officer on HMS Andromache, under the command of Henry Ducie Chads, in the East Indies.

In December 1834 Hill returned to HMS Melville, now the flagship of John Gore, in the East Indies for twelve months. Promoted to lieutenant commander, he was assigned to the command of HMS Saracen, a Cherokee-class brig-sloop, at the Cape of Good Hope and coast of Africa, from 14 April 1837 to 1841.

During his tenure of command of HMS Saracen, Hill captured the Spanish slave-holding schooner Labradora on 31 March 1839 and emancipated its cargo of 248 slaves. After an investigation, it was learned that Labradora was to convey up to 300 slaves to the Island of Cuba. On 7 February 1840, Hill seized the schooner Sénégambie in the port of St. Mary's, on the River Gambia, while it underwent repairs. Sénégambie "was equipped in some respects for the slave trade." Its owner, M. Jacques Marbeau, was ordered to trial by the Vice-Admiralty Court for aiding and abetting the slave trade.

On 6 March 1843 Hill was appointed the first 'proper' Governor of the British colony of the Gold Coast, a position he retained until 8 March 1845. One of the highlights of Hill's governorship was the signing of the Bond of 1844. This treaty, signed by several chiefs, established British law in the area, including the abolition of human sacrifice and panyarring.

On 1 July 1845 Hill married Amelia Jane Boyce (1821–1895), eldest daughter of Henry Pytches Boyce (1786–1858) and Lady Amelia Sophia (née Spencer), daughter of George, third Duke of Marlborough. The couple would go on to have ten children. He died on 14 October 1868.
