= The Negro Farmer =

1938 film by the US Department of Agriculture

The Negro Farmer: Extension Work for Better Farming and Better Living is a 1938 educational film made by the United States Department of Agriculture with assistance from the Tuskegee Institute. It features music, entitled "Negro Melodies", from the Tuskegee Institute Choir directed by African American composer William L. Dawson. Through commentary from a white male narrator using racial innuendo implying African American inferiority in farming practices, the film is a condescending, "paternalistic portrait of black rural life", intended to "halt a mass migration to the urban north by black people".

With a 23-minute runtime, the film features Redoshi (c. 1848 – 1937) (renamed Sally Smith by her enslaver, Washington Smith), a West African woman taken to Dallas County, Alabama in 1860. Redoshi is considered one of the two last surviving victims of the transatlantic slave trade.

The Negro Farmer (1938)

The film is held by the National Archives. It was part of a U.S. governmental effort to promote agricultural improvements guided by the USDA's guidance, emphasizing that "blacks should stay on Southern farms".

This film is viewable at the U.S. National Archives online catalogue.

== Crew ==
- Raymond Evans - Director, producer. Directed Poor Mrs. Jones! (1926) and Hemp for Victory (1943)
- George G. Farrington - Narrator
