= Barracoon =

Historic barracks used for enslaved or criminals

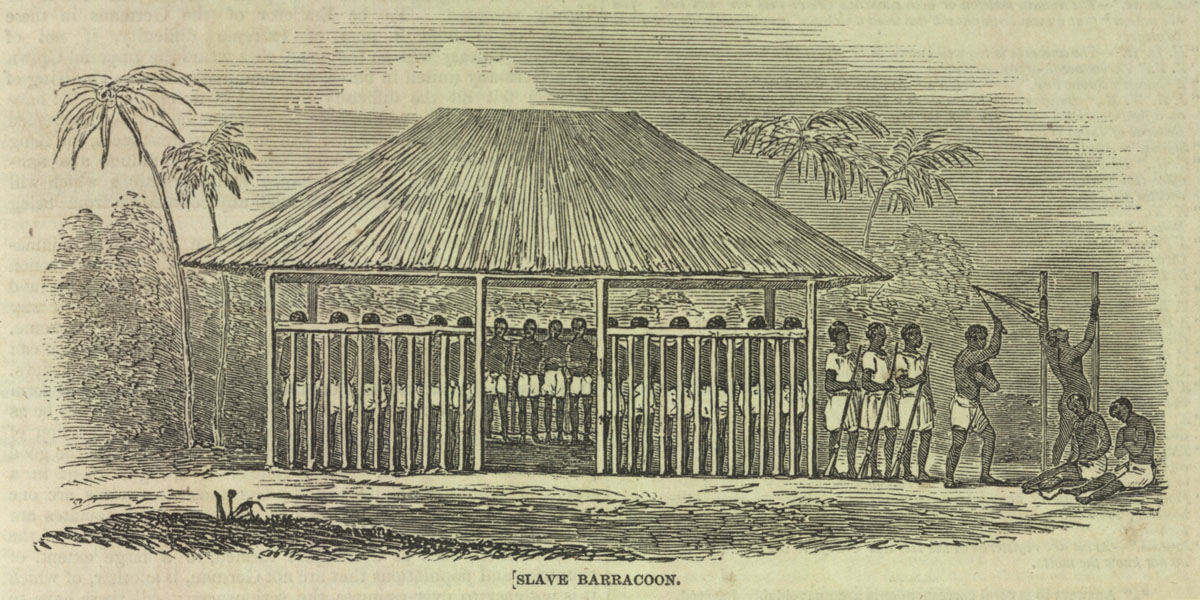
Slave baracoon, Sierra Leone, 1849

A barracoon is a type of barracks used historically for the internment of enslaved or criminal human beings. (The term is an adaptation of Portuguese barracão, an augmentative form of the Catalan loanword barraca ('hut') through Spanish barracón.)

In the Atlantic slave trade, captured individuals were temporarily transported to and imprisoned at barracoons along the coast of West Africa, where they awaited forced transportation across the Atlantic Ocean. A barracoon simplified the slave trader's job of keeping the people destined for slavery alive and in captivity, with the barracks being closely guarded and the captives being fed and allowed exercise.

The barracoons varied in size and design, from small enclosures adjacent to the businesses of European traders to larger protected buildings. The amount of time enslaved persons spent inside a barracoon depended on their health as well as the availability of slave ships. Many captive enslaved individuals died in barracoons, some as a consequence of the hardships they experienced on their journeys and some as a result of their exposure to lethal European diseases.

== See also ==
- Barracoon: The Story of the Last "Black Cargo", a non-fiction work by Zora Neale Hurston based on her interviews in 1927 with Cudjoe Lewis
- Seasoning (slavery)
- Signare
- Atlantic Creole
- House of Slaves
