= Justly Hill =

English anglican priest (1781–1853)

Justly Hill (bapt. 16 December 1781 – 18 March 1853) was the Archdeacon of Buckingham from 1825 until 1853.

He was born at St Boniface parish, Bonchurch, Isle of Wight, the youngest son of Col. William Hill, who served as aide-de-camp to Count de Lipp in the Seven Years' War, and Elizabeth Popham (1744–1809), great-granddaughter of MP Alexander Popham. He was the younger brother of Capt. Henry Hill. He was educated at Winchester College and New College, Oxford and ordained in 1806. He was Rector of Tingewick before being appointed Archdeacon of Buckingham on 7 September 1825. He died on 18 March 1853.

== Marriage and issue ==
Hill married Jane Helen Shute, daughter of Samuel Shute in 1820 and had issue:

- Elizabeth Anne Hill (1828–1867), married Captain Charles Henry Douglas-Hamilton RN, and had issue:
  - Alfred Douglas-Hamilton, 13th Duke of Hamilton, married Nina Poore
  - Helena Augusta Charlotte Constance Sidney
  - Isabel Frances Ulrica Iris
  - Flora Mary Ida, married Robert Poore

Church of England titles
Preceded by Luke Heslop	Archdeacons of Buckingham; 1825–1853	Succeeded by Edward Bickersteth
