= Bogue Chitto, Alabama =

Unincorporated community in Alabama, United States

- Unincorporated community
- Location within the state of Alabama Bogue; Chitto (the United States)
- Coordinates: 32.366°N 87.304°W
- Country: United States
- State: Alabama
- County: Dallas
- Elevation: 151 ft (46 m)
- Time zone: UTC-6 (Central (CST))
  - Summer (DST): UTC-5 (CDT)
- Area code: 334

Bogue Chitto /boʊɡ ˈtʃɪtə/ is an unincorporated community in Dallas County, Alabama. It was named for the nearby creek of the same name, which in the Choctaw language means "big stream."

== History ==
In the early 1900s, the population consisted of black landowners whose ancestors had been enslaved on the cotton-producing plantations and had bought land there after the American Civil War ended. Almost every man was registered to vote and did vote, from Reconstruction until their rights were taken away. A spirit of independence, caused by landownership, prevented even the Ku Klux Klan from infringing upon their rights: "Local lore had it that the Klan came calling one night, looking for a Bogue Chitto man who had refused to doff his hat to a white man and say 'Yessir'. They were met by a spray of bullets and did not come back".

Inoculations against typhoid in 1930 were administered to over 900 people in Bogue Chitto. Amelia Platts, a "black home demonstration agent" ("community clubs" had been opened throughout Dallas County to help improve the lives of African-American farmers and their families) who attended the county nurse during the process, noted an active community spirit. It was one of the first places to welcome voter registration classes a decade later. Later, the Student Nonviolent Coordinating Committee got four volunteers from Bogue Chitto and a minister from a church just south of the community to help with voter registration efforts in the area.

== Geography ==
Bogue Chitto is located at 32.366°N 87.304°W and has an elevation of 151 feet (46 m).

== Notable residents ==
- Redoshi, aka as Sally Smith, woman originally from Benin, West Africa, was kidnapped in 1860, transported on the Clotilda, and sold to a Dallas County planter.
- Amelia Boynton Robinson, Civil Rights activist, based in Bogue Chitto
