= Twelvemile Island Ship Graveyard Historical and Archaeological District =

Shipwreck site near Mobile, Alabama

- U.S. National Register of Historic Places
- U.S. Historic district
- Location within Alabama Location within the United States
- Location: Mobile River, Alabama
- Coordinates: 30°47′30″N 87°59′32″W
- NRHP reference No.: 100007203
- Added to NRHP: December 6, 2021

The Twelvemile Island Ship Graveyard Historical and Archaeological District is a shipwreck site in the Mobile River near Mobile, Alabama, United States. The collection of five wrecks – one large, potentially three-masted ship; three barges; and an unidentified ship – are part of a ship graveyard.

The main wreck was discovered in January 2018 by journalist Ben Raines during an extreme low tide. Believing the wreck to be that of the Clotilda, the last known slave ship to arrive in the United States, an archaeological survey was performed on March 1–4, 2018. The wreck was determined not to be the Clotilda, as it was longer (approximately 158 feet (48 m) long, compared to the Clotilda's 86 feet (26 m)) and constructed of pine rather than oak. A later survey determined the ship to be constructed of Douglas fir, suggesting it was built on the Pacific coast and sailed around South America to Mobile.

The site was listed on the National Register of Historic Places in 2021.
