= Emma Langdon Roche =

American writer and artist (1878–1945)

Emma Langdon Roche (March 26, 1878 – April 5, 1945) was an American writer and artist, best known for her work Historic Sketches of The South (1914).

She was the first writer to publish a book based on interviews with Cudjoe Lewis, also known as Kossola, a survivor of the Middle Passage. He was a captive on the last known slave ship, Clotilda, which a group of Americans used to illegally import slaves to Alabama in 1860 from present-day Benin, decades after the 1807 prohibition of the Atlantic trade. Her book included an original photograph of Lewis and his wife, as well as her drawings of him and other of the survivors.

== Background ==
Emma Langdon Roche was born in 1878 in Mobile, Alabama as the third of four surviving children of Thomas T. and Annie Laura (James) Roche. Her father was born in Ireland and had been brought to the US at the age of two in 1845 by his immigrant parents, to escape the Great Famine. He became a funeral director in Mobile. Her mother was born in Alabama, where her parents had moved from Virginia. (Emma's maternal grandmother was born in Vermont.)

Emma had three surviving brothers, Edward J. (born 1872, who also became a funeral director), Frank L. (born 1875) and the younger Thomas Sheppard Roche (born 1883). Two other children had died young. Their maternal aunt, Margaret James, also lived with the family.

== Historic Sketches of The South ==
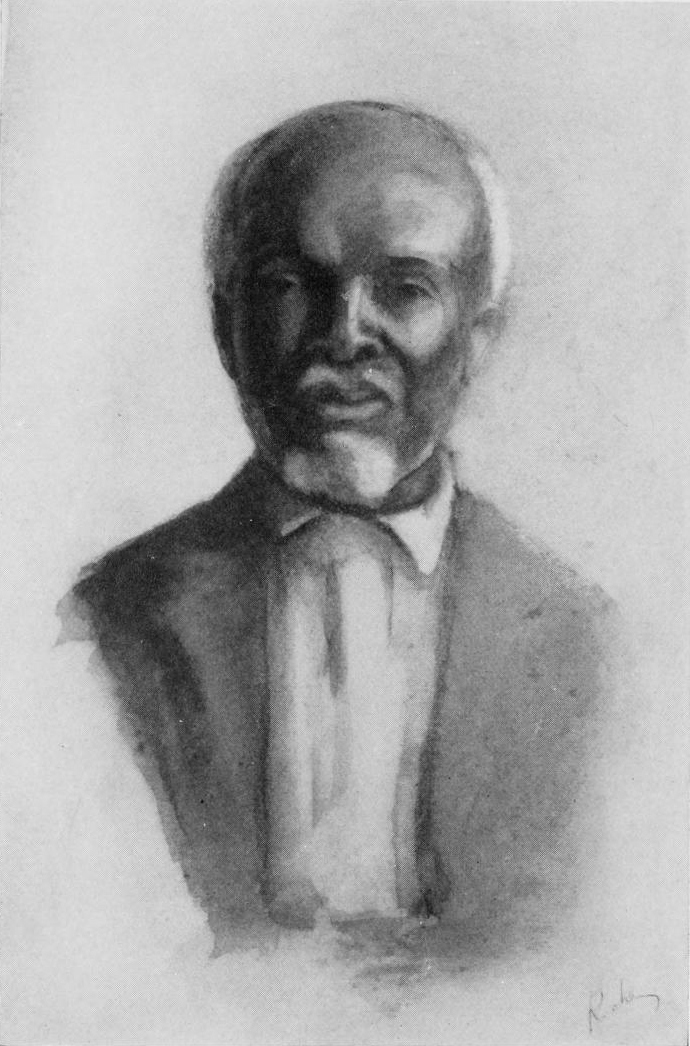
Roche’s drawing of Cudjoe Lewis, included in Historic Sketches of The South.

Visits to nearby Africatown prompted Roche to interview the residents, most of whom were freedmen. Here, Roche met Cudjoe (Kazoola) Lewis, one of the founders of Africatown. He was born in Africa and had been taken captive, sold into slavery and transported to Alabama onboard the Clotilde (or Clotilda), the last known illegal Atlantic slaver to bring slaves to the United States. Roche wrote and published a two-volume work known as Historic Sketches of The South (1914). It includes Roche's original drawings and photographs of the residents of Africatown.

The book features Roche's discussion of the development of slavery in the United States from the colonial period. It also features material from her interviews with Cudjoe (Kazoola) Lewis, who was among the survivors of Africans taken captive and sold into slavery in 1860, and brought to Alabama on board the Clotilda. Lewis recounted elements of his village life in Africa, among the Tarkar people. His village was attacked by the Dahomey people, and he and other captives were sold into slavery. Roche included a drawing of a map indicating where his village was in relation to other settlements. It also showed the path the captives were forced to take to the coastal city where they were sold and put on the Clotilda.

== Legacy ==
Roche's book is part of the collection of the Mobile Historical Society. It has been used by later researchers and writers as a resource about the residents of Africatown and the history of the Clotilde. For instance, Zora Neale Hurston, then a student in anthropology, interviewed Cudjo Lewis and other Africans in Alabama as part of her research. She published an article in 1927, “Cudjo’s Own Story of the Last African Slaver,” purportedly based on her interviews with Lewis. It was found to consist mostly of plagiarized portions of Roche's text, whom Hurston did not credit. At the time, Hurston had to acknowledge her failure in writing her own work with her adviser, Dr. Franz Boas. While he did not condone her action, he gave her another chance and supported her continuing her studies.

In 1972 another scholar publicly noted the plagiarism in Hurston's article. In 1980, Robert E. Hemenway's biography of Hurston addressed this issue further, and he compared the texts at length, giving full credit to Roche for her account. Scholar Genevieve Sexton has also noted Hurston's plagiarism, and that in places, "Hurston removed Roche's racist hand, and replaced it with her empowering one."
