= Frazine Taylor =

American genealogist (1945–2024)

Frazine K. Taylor
- Born: Frazine Kennett Jones; March 21, 1945; Wetumpka, Alabama, US
- Died: July 24, 2024 (aged 79); Montgomery, Alabama, US
- Education: Knoxville College (BCom); Atlanta University (MLIS)
- Occupations: Librarian, genealogist, historian. archivist

Frazine K. Taylor (March 21, 1945 – July 24, 2024), née Frazine Kennett Jones, was a librarian, archivist, historian, genealogist, and author, known for her work in African American genealogy, particularly during her time as the first coordinator of the Researching African American Ancestry track at the Institute of Genealogy and Historical Research at the Alabama Department of Archives and History, and afterwards as a freelance genealogist, lecturer, and mentor and as a part-time archivist at Alabama State University. She was renowned for her ability to trace enslaved people for their descendants, and helped over 10,000 individuals find their ancestors over the course of her career.

== Early life and education ==
Frazine Kennett Jones was born March 21, 1945, in Wetumpka, Alabama, and she was the second child and only daughter of Professor John L. and Martha Odessa Jones.

She graduated from Southern Normal High School in Brewton, Alabama.

She earned a bachelor's degree in Business Commerce (BCom) from the historically black Knoxville College in Knoxville, Tennessee, and received a Master of Library and Information Science (MLIS) degree from Atlanta University in 1984.

== Career ==
In 1967 Taylor started volunteering for the Peace Corps, including living in the Fiji Islands and travelling extensively in the South Pacific, before returning to work at the Peace Corps Headquarters in Washington, D.C. from 1970 to 1976 where she was in charge of sending peace corps volunteers to overseas posts.

In 1984 Taylor became an assistant cataloguer at the Tuskegee University library, and in 1985 she was chosen for a six-month internship at the National Agricultural Library in Beltsville, MD.

After completing her master's degree, Taylor became a ready-reference librarian at the Alabama Department of Archives and History (ADAH) in 1985. She rose to co-head of ready reference for genealogy before retiring from the ADAH in 2010.

In 2010, following her retirement from the Alabama Department of Archives and History, Taylor began working part-time as an archiver at Alabama State University, and eventually at the university's Levi Watkins Learning Center.

She was a member of the Afro-American Historical and Genealogical Society, and served on the editorial board of its journal. She was the president of the Elmore County Association of Black Heritage, chair of the Black Heritage Council of the Alabama Historical Commission, a member of the Black Belt African American Genealogical and Historical Society (BBAAGHS) and a member of the Society of Alabama Archivists. She served on the board of directors of the Alabama Historical Association and in 2019 became its first African American president.

She served on the board of the Patrons for the Study of Civil Rights and African-American Culture at Alabama State University, was a member of the Alabama Cemetery Preservation Alliance, served on the Alabama Governor's Mansion Authority, and was president of the Friends of the Alabama Archives.

From 2004 to 2018 Taylor coordinated the African American Course for the Institute of Genealogy and Historical Research (IGHR) at Samford University, Birmingham, Alabama.

Taylor researched family roots and ties to Alabama for the two Henry Louis Gates Jr. PBS series African American Lives 2 (2008) and Finding Your Roots (2012), for Tom Joyner, Linda Johnson Rice, and Condoleezza Rice.

In 2016, along with Donna Cox Baker, she co-founded the Beyond Kin Project to serve as a platform to encourage, facilitate, and enable the documentation of enslaved populations in the United States, particularly through encouraging the descendants of slaveholders to share the records they hold, recognizing how the lives the enslaved and slaveholders were intertwined and that the fullest accounting of an enslaved person's life required awareness of the circumstances of the slaveholders.

== Personal life ==
While she was at the Peace Corps Headquarters in Washington D.C. from 1970 to 1976, Frazine met and married Donald Taylor, a graphic designer and father of five. Donald and Frazine had no children together. Donald Taylor died of cancer in 1994.

Frazine died at the age of 79 on July 24, 2024, in Montgomery, Alabama.

== Honors and legacy ==
- Employee of the Year from the Alabama State Employee Association
- In 2019, she was awarded the Hamilton Award from the AHA given "for significant contributions to Alabama history, which encourage joint endeavours and mutual understanding between non-professional and professional historians."
- The Frazine K. Taylor African American Research IGHR Scholarship was established in 2019 by the Institute of Genealogy and Historical Research of the Georgia Genealogical Society, Inc in her honour upon her retirement as the coordinator of the "Researching African American Ancestors" course at the institute. The award is open to both professional librarians and archivists who help their patrons with African American research and to anyone committed to expanding their knowledge of African American research. It is administered by Deborah A. Abbott, PhD.
- In 2020 she was awarded the prestigious Dorothy Porter Wesley Award by the Information Professionals of the Association for the Study of African American Life and History (ASALH) for her contributions to the field.

== Selected publications ==
- Taylor, Frazine. Researching African American Genealogy in Alabama: A Resource Guide. ISBN 978-1-603-06094-3
