= Henry Hill (Royal Navy officer) =

British naval officer

Vice-Admiral Henry Hill (23 May 1772 – 7 June 1849) was a Royal Navy officer.

== Early life ==
He was born in St Boniface parish, Bonchurch, the second son of Col. William Hill, who served as aide-de-camp to Count de Lipp in the Seven Years' War, and Elizabeth Popham (1744–1809), great-granddaughter of MP Alexander Popham. His younger brother was Archdeacon Ven. Justly Hill.

== Career ==
Hill entered the Royal Navy 10 November 1787 as a volunteer on board HMS Vestal, commanded by Sir Richard John Strachan. In August of 1791 he was transferred as a midshipman to HMS Phoenix. On his return to England in the autumn of 1793 Hill joined HMS Boyne, commanded by Sir John Jervis. He was promoted to lieutenant on 17 December 1793. In 1794 he participated in the capture of Fort Royal, Martinique. He was promoted to the rank of commander on 24 July 1796. In the spring of 1798 he was appointed to the Sea-Fencibles in the Isle of Wight, England. From 27 June 1799 until 1 January 1801 he commanded HMS Gorgon in the Mediterranean Sea and also HMS Megaera. After various other appointments, he later commanded HMS Naiad, successfully blockading the French ports on their coast and destroying much of their coastal trade. After further appointments he was promoted to rear-admiral on 22 July 1830 and further promoted to vice-admiral on 23 November 1841. Reportedly "In every ship commanded by the Vice-Admiral when afloat he won the approbation of the Admiralty. On HMS Melville he was particularly fortunate in eliciting that of H.R.H. the Lord High Admiral (William IV)". On 26 February 1845 he was granted the Good Service pension.

== Family ==
He married, first, Anne, daughter of the late Reverend James Worsley, of Gatcombe, Isle of Wight, England; and secondly, Caroline, daughter of the late Joseph Bettesworth, Esquire, of Ryde, Isle of Wight, England. He had four daughters and six sons. The eldest being a captain and later a governor of the Gold Coast, Henry Worsley Hill.
