= Barracoon: The Story of the Last "Black Cargo" =

Book by Zora Neale Hurston

- Hardcover edition
- Author: Zora Neale Hurston
- Language: English
- Subject: Biography of the last known survivor of the Atlantic slave trade
- Genre: Nonfiction
- Publisher: Amistad Press
- Publication date: May 8, 2018
- Publication place: United States
- Pages: 208
- ISBN: 9780062748201

Barracoon: The Story of the Last “Black Cargo” is a non-fiction novel written by acclaimed author Zora Neale Hurston. Hurston centers the work around Oluale Kossola, also known as Cudjoe Lewis, and his experiences on the Middle Passage. Lewis is believed to be one of the last known survivors of the voyages who could recall clear memories. Originally from West Africa, he was captured from his home and sold in the Atlantic Slave Trade in 1860, making him just a teenager when he arrived in Alabama to begin working. He was placed on the ship Clotilda. Lewis was held as an enslaved man for 5 and half years in Plateau-Magazine, AL, enduring intensive work. Hurston interviewed Lewis, documenting his accounts for her book. She began her interviews with Lewis in 1927, but all his accounts date back to the late 1800’s, in the post Civil War era.

== Background ==
=== Lewis ===
Spanning from 1841 to July 17, 1935, Cudjoe Lewis led a complex life. Lewis grew up in the Bantè region of Benin, West Africa. He was a trained soldier by the age of fourteen. This training gave him a vast variety of survival skills. With this, he was soon inducted into a society called the oro. It was from this town that he was forcibly removed from his home and put on the Middle Passage. This event would completely change his life. He was assumedly in his late teens to early twenties when captured. Now without his family, Lewis describes how he navigates being an enslaved man alone.

Prior to being shipped to Alabama, Lewis had no real interaction with people outside of his environment. He did not recognize the significance between races prior to relocating. This lack of socialization allowed Lewis to be ignorant. It wasn't until he was relocated and subjected to the effects of skin color that he began to realize. Lewis describes his experiences as "traumatic" due to the labels, such as “Black Cargo”, inflicted on him. This all in addition to the expectations that were put on him during his enslavement due to his race.

In reference to the interviews, Lewis was more than willing. He expresseed excitement about the idea of people in Africa knowing his name. He spoke to Hurston on multiple occasions. At each meeting they shared gifts between each other as a sign of respect for the process and friendship.

=== Hurston ===
Zora Neale Hurston, born January 7, 1891, is a female author of many progressive works, most of which are still circulating today. Aside from writing, she is also described as a cultural anthropologist, ethnographer, and folklorist. At the time, she was eager to speak to Lewis. She wanted to get as many details to document his life as she could. In 1927 she traveled from New York to Mobile, Alabama to meet him for initial interviewing. She continued traveling and interviewing Lewis for three months after their first meeting.

Hurston went on to live until January 28, 1960.

=== Publication ===
When Hurston wrote Barracoon, it was not as widely accepted as it is now. She finished writing almost a century before publication. When Hurston presented her work to publishers in the 1930s, they rejected it. Many believed that the novel was too alienating, as well as containing too much dialect. As a direct source from the Middle Passage, he could give real, specific accounts of his time on it, making the novel unfavorable. Publishing outlets made offers to Hurston if she changed her wording. She believed that the narrative she wrote was vital, that the language used was authenticating, and that the value of the accounts would significantly decrease if she removed Lewis’ dialect. Due to this, she refused all offers. Her writing was dismissed for a long period, it was not until 2018 that Amistad Press published Hurston’s book.

== Central Themes ==
The novel is a timeline of Lewis’ entire life. The reader gets insight on what it was like for an average person to be enslaved. Barracoon gives Lewis’ perspective showing how he was flourishing in a thriving society before being captured and relocated.

=== Reality of Slavery ===
Barracoon displays a unique perspective on the true experience of those enslaved, as well as post emancipation. Lewis’ capture story begins with a recollection of soldiers coming to his town. They killed and captured as they pleased. Neither hiding nor escape seemed to have worked. He describes the scene as gruesome. Lewis and countless others were tied together and forced to walk day and night for multiple days to get to Dahomey, the coast where they would soon be loaded onto Clotilda.

=== Importance of Culture ===
While living in Africatown (or Plateau), Alabama, Lewis felt extremely disconnected from his culture. He described a sense of distress due to his distance from home. His displacement caused him to lose not only his family, but community, traditions, and sense of social structure as well. In the interviews, Lewis yearns for his culture back.

== See also ==
- Barracoon
- Clotilda (slave ship)
