= Matilda McCrear =

Last living survivor of the transatlantic slave trade

- Born: Àbáké c. 1857; West Africa
- Died: January 13, 1940 (aged 82–83); Selma, Alabama, U.S.
- Other name: Matilda Creagh
- Occupation: Farmer (1865–?)

Matilda McCrear (c. 1857 – January 13, 1940), born Àbáké, was the last known survivor in the United States of the transatlantic slave trade and the ship Clotilda. She was a Yoruba who was captured and brought to Mobile, Alabama at the age of two with her mother and older sister.

The girls were sold away from their mother and never reunited. Together with other American slaves in territory not occupied by the Union in the South, Matilda was granted freedom by the Emancipation Proclamation of 1863. She and her family did not achieve freedom until after the de jure abolition of slavery in 1865. She continued to be a sharecropper as an adult and had a family of fourteen children with a white German-born American common-law husband. She died in Selma, Alabama.

McCrear's life became publicly known through research by Hannah Durkin of Newcastle University, published in 2020.

== Life ==
McCrear was captured as a young child in West Africa with her mother and sister by the army of the West African kingdom of Dahomey, which had attacked their home. The Dahomeyans transported their prisoners to Ouidah, a coastal port for slave trading. Captain William Foster of the Clotilda, the last known slave ship to have carried captives from Africa to the United States, later arrived in Ouidah and transported 110 enslaved Africans including McCrear to the United States illegally (the U.S. prohibited the Atlantic slave trade in 1808 with the Act Prohibiting Importation of Slaves). The raid that led to her capture was part of a bigger system in which the Kingdom of Dahomey participated in the Atlantic slave trade by capturing and selling slaves.

Writing in his journal in 1860, Foster described how the enslaved prisoners came aboard his ship:

from thence I went to see the King of Dahomey. Having agreeably transacted affairs with the Prince we went to the warehouse where they had in confinement four thousand captives in a state of nudity from which they gave me liberty to select one hundred and twenty-five as mine offering to brand them for me, from which I preemptorily [sic] forbid; commenced taking on cargo of negroes, successfully securing on board one hundred and ten.

McCrear was a member of the Yoruba people. She received traditional facial scars which were visible for the rest of her life. When she was two years old, McCrear, her mother Gracie, and sister Sallie (as they were named in the U.S.) were captured and bought by a planter, Memorable Creagh. They were among more than 100 Africans transported in 1860 on the Clotilda. She had two other sisters whose names are not known, and a stepfather, Guy. The girls were later sold apart from their mother and never reunited. Family separation in the American slave trade was common, as enslaved individuals were often sold without regard for their family and relationships. These separations often resulted in permanent loss of parents, children, and siblings, as we see with McCrear’s experience. The psychological and emotional impact of these separations goes beyond emancipation and shaped the lives of formerly enslaved people for many generations to come.

After the abolition of slavery in 1865, McCrear (who first took the surname of Creagh) continued to work as a sharecropper in Alabama with her relatives. Sharecropping emerged after the Civil War and it often kept formerly enslaved individuals in cycles of debt and economic dependency. Although African Americans were technically free, many were unable to gain wealth or gain financial stability due to certain sharecropping rules. McCrear’s experience as a sharecropper reflects these challenges faced by African Americans in the South after emancipation. She never married, but, according to her grandson, had 14 children with a white German-born man. She changed her name from Creagh to McCrear.

In her seventies, McCrear made a legal claim for compensation for her enslavement, which was dismissed. She reportedly traveled long distances in an effort to pursue the claim, demonstrating determination to fight the conditions of her enslavement even decades after emancipation. According to Durkin, she appears to have continued to have worn her hair in a traditional Yoruba style all her life.

In January 1940, McCrear fell ill after a stroke. She died January 13 in Selma, Alabama, aged 83.

== Historiography ==
McCrear’s life received public attention following research by historian Hannah Durkin, published in 2020, who identified her as the last known survivor of the transatlantic slave trade. Many news outlets used her story to document the impact and recency of the slave trade.

Prior to the publication of Durkin's research in 2020, McCrear's contemporary Redoshi (c. 1848 – 1937) was thought to be the last living survivor of the Clotilda and of the transatlantic slave trade.

== See also ==
- List of the last surviving American slaves
