= Timothy Meaher =

American slaver, businessman, and landowner

- Born: 1812; Bowdoinham, Maine or Gardiner, Maine, U.S.
- Died: March 3, 1892 (aged 79–80); Mobile, Alabama, U.S.
- Occupation: Slave trader

Timothy Meaher (1812 – 3 March 1892) was an American slave trader, son of an Irish immigrant father, James Meaher, and an Anglo-Irish American mother, Susannah Millay [Millea]. He was one of eight children and he was raised in rural Whitefield, Maine. In 1835, Timothy and his brother James left Maine for Mobile, Alabama. In that same year, Timothy had worked on a steamboat named the Wanderer. Meaher worked on nine different ships before he owned his own steamboat and a large sawmill in the 1840s. In 1855, Timothy married Mary C. Waters. Mary C. Waters was the niece of Edward Kavanagh, who was active in local politics and briefly the Governor of Maine, 1843–1844. Meaher and three of his brothers had plantations, sawmills, timberlands, and steamboats. Meaher was a wealthy human trafficker, businessman, and landowner. He purchased the slave-ship Clotilda and was responsible for the last known slave voyage to the United States after the banning of the importation of slaves.

== The Slave Voyage of the Clotilda ==
In 1860, Timothy Meaher made a bet that he would be able to commission a slave voyage to Africa and back to Alabama without being caught by local authorities in order to avoid the 1807 Act Prohibiting Importation of Slaves. Meaher hired Captain William Foster to complete the slave voyage for him aboard the Clotilda. On March 3, 1860, the Clotilda left Mobile Bay, Alabama, for the West African port of Ouidah. Captain Foster purchased 110 enslaved Africans to bring back to Alabama, but only 108 survived the voyage. The voyage lasted a total of 126 days. When the Clotilda arrived back in Mobile Bay, Alabama, Foster and Meaher had to work late into the first night to unload the enslaved Africans off of the ship without getting caught by the authorities. The enslaved Africans were put onto small boats and were taken to John Dabney's property, one of Meaher's friends, where they would be concealed for multiple days to avoid suspicion.

Meaher sold some of the slaves but took the rest to work for his brother and himself. Meaher had its captain, William Foster (1825–1901), burn and scuttle Clotilda in Mobile Bay, attempting to destroy evidence of their joint lawbreaking. The wreck was located in 2019.

The enslaved Africans brought to the US aboard the Clotilda were enslaved for five years until the 13th Amendment to the Constitution was passed in 1865. After slavery was abolished, the Africans who were enslaved on Meaher's plantation were freed, but Meaher refused to help them return home or provide reparations. Thirty-two formerly enslaved Africans purchased land from Meaher, where they established a town they named 'Africatown', which still exists to this day in Mobile Alabama. The United States government attempted to charge Meaher with "failing to pay dues on his cargo," but due to factors such as difficulty proving the crime and the Civil War, he was never prosecuted. However in 1890, two years before his death, Meaher bragged in a newspaper interview about his slave trading.

== Death and legacy ==
Timothy Meaher died on March 3, 1892, in Mobile, Alabama. He is buried at the Catholic Cemetery in Toulminville, Alabama.

Meaher's grandson, Augustine Meaher Jr., leased a portion of his family's land to a paper mill in 1926. The land that Augustine leased to the paper mill was already home to hundreds of houses that his family had leased for nearly 100 years to Africatown residents, some of whom were descendants of the enslaved Africans aboard the Clotilda. The building of the International Paper Mill displaced Africatown residents and created a negative environmental impact on the community.

The Meaher family is still prominent in Alabama, with Meaher State Park bearing the name, as well as a Meaher Street running through Africatown. The family has refused to make any statement "about their sinister ancestor's crime" or release his personal papers. Some of the family members composed a letter with a public statement in October 2022 expressing disapproval of their ancestor's actions. Meaher's descendants stated that, "Our family has been silent for too long on this matter. However, we are hopeful that we — the current generation of the Meaher family — can start a new chapter." They also acknowledged that Meaher’s actions "had consequences that have impacted generations of people."
