= Clotilda (slave ship) =

Last known U.S. slave ship, used in 1860

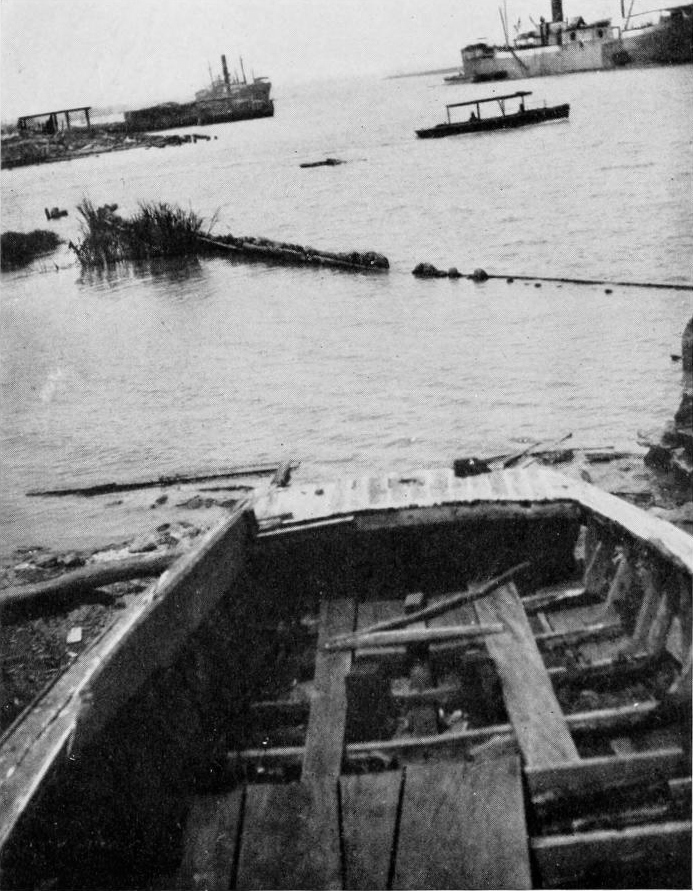
- Wreck of the slave ship Clotilda; photograph from Historic Sketches of the South by Emma Langdon Roche, 1914

History

United States
- Name: Clotilda
- Owner: Timothy Meaher
- Launched: c. 1855–56
- Fate: Scuttled in July 1860
- Notes: Last known U.S. slave ship to bring captives from Africa to the United States

General characteristics
- Class & type: lumber trade
- Length: 86 ft (26 m)
- Beam: 23 ft (7.0 m)
- Sail plan: Schooner

The schooner Clotilda (often misspelled Clotilde) was the last known U.S. slave ship to bring enslaved individuals from West and Central Africa to the United States, arriving at Mobile Bay, in autumn 1859 or on July 9, 1860, with 110 African men, women, and children. The ship was a two-masted schooner, 86 feet (26 m) long with a beam of 23 ft (7.0 m).

U.S. involvement in the Atlantic slave trade had been banned by Congress through the Act Prohibiting Importation of Slaves enacted on March 2, 1807 (effective January 1, 1808), but the practice continued illegally. In the case of the Clotilda, the voyage's sponsors were based in the South and planned to buy Africans in Whydah, Dahomey. After the voyage, the ship was burned and scuttled in Mobile Bay in an attempt to destroy the evidence.

After the Civil War, Oluale Kossola, also known as Cudjo Lewis, and 31 other formerly enslaved people founded Africatown on the north side of Mobile, Alabama. They were joined by other continental Africans and formed a community that continued to practice many of their West African traditions and Yoruba language for decades.

A spokesman for the community, Kossola lived until 1935 and was one of the last survivors from the Clotilda. Redoshi, another captive on the Clotilda, was sold to a planter in Dallas County, Alabama, where she became known also as Sally Smith. She married, had a daughter, and lived until 1937 in Bogue Chitto. She was long thought to have been the last survivor of the Clotilda. Research published in 2020 indicated that another survivor, Matilda McCrear, lived until 1940.

Some 100 descendants of the enslaved people carried by the Clotilda still live in Africatown, and others are around the country. After World War II, the neighborhood was absorbed by the city of Mobile. A memorial bust of Lewis was placed in front of the historic Union Missionary Baptist Church. The Africatown historic district was listed on the National Register of Historic Places in 2012. In May 2019, the Alabama Historical Commission announced that remnants of a ship found along the Mobile River, near 12 Mile Island and just north of the Mobile Bay delta, were confirmed as the Clotilda. The wreck site was listed on the National Register of Historic Places in 2021.

== History ==
Captain William Foster was captain of the schooner Clotilda, working for Timothy Meaher, a wealthy Mobile shipyard owner and steamboat captain. In 1855 or 1856, Meaher had built Clotilda, a two-masted schooner 86 feet (26 m) long with a beam of 23 feet (7.0 m) and a copper-sheathed hull, designed for the lumber trade.

The schooner had been refitted as a slave ship with a false deck. Foster obtained papers with the false claim he was delivering lumber. Disrupting the compass was 9,000 dollars in gold (containing magnetic metal impurities), which led the vessel off course. A hurricane off the Bermuda coast damaged the ship. While repairing, the crew of 11 who did not know the real mission purpose, discovered the hidden deck. To persuade them not to alert authorities, Foster agreed to pay them double, which ultimately he did not.

Meaher had learned that West African tribes were at war and that the King of Dahomey (now Benin) was willing to sell enemy prisoners as slaves. Dahomey's forces had been raiding communities in the interior, bringing captives to the large slave market at the port of Ouidah. Meaher was said to have wagered another wealthy gentleman from New Orleans, that he could successfully smuggle Africans into the US despite the 1807 Act Prohibiting Importation of Slaves.

Departing on March 4, 1860, Foster sailed from Mobile with a crew of 12, including himself, arriving in Whydah on May 15, 1860, where he had the ship outfitted to carry Africans, using materials he had transported. He offered to buy 125 Africans in Whydah for $100 each. said to be mostly of the "Tarkbar" tribe, taken in a raid near Tamale in present-day Ghana. Research in the 21st century suggests that they were actually Takpa or Tapa people, the northern Yoruba name for the neighboring Nupe people from the interior of present-day Nigeria.

He described meeting an African prince and being taken to the king's court, where he observed some religious practices. Foster wrote in his journal in 1860, "Having agreeably transacted affairs with the Prince we went to the warehouse where they had in confinement four thousand captives in a state of nudity from which they gave me liberty to select one hundred and twenty-five as mine offering to brand them for me, from which I preemptorily [sic] forbid; commenced taking on cargo of negroes, successfully securing on board one hundred and ten."

As the captives were being loaded, Foster saw two steamers off the port and, fearing capture, ordered the crew to leave immediately, although only 110 Africans had been secured on board, leaving behind the last 15. They saw a man o' war during the ocean passage, but escaped notice when a squall came up and they outran the ship, reaching Abaco lighthouse at the Bahama banks by June 30. As they neared the United States, they disguised the schooner by taking down the "squaresail yards and the fore topmast", hoping to pass as a "coaster" carrying African captives within the US in the domestic coastal trade.

Foster's journal recorded that he anchored Clotilda on July 9 off Point of Pines in Grand Bay, Mississippi (likely referring to Point Aux Pins on Grand Bay in Alabama, near the Mississippi state line). He traveled overland by horse and buggy to Mobile to meet with Meaher. Fearful of criminal charges, Captain Foster brought the schooner into the Port of Mobile at night and had it towed up the Spanish River to the Alabama River at Twelve Mile Island. He transferred the African captives to a river steamboat, then burned Clotilda "to the water's edge" before sinking it. He paid off the crew and told them to return North.

The African captives were mostly distributed to the financial backers of the Clotilda venture, with Timothy Meaher retaining 30 captives on his property north of Mobile, including Cudjo (aka Cudjoe) Lewis, known as Kossoula or Kazoola. Despite the racial hierarchy of the Deep South, the Africans from Clotilda could not be legally registered as slaves because they were smuggled in; however, they were treated as chattel. Some of the captives were sold farther away, including Redoshi (later known also as Sally Smith) and a man later known as William or Billy, whom she was forced to marry on board the ship. They were sold to Washington Smith, a planter in Dallas County, Alabama.

In 1861, the federal government prosecuted Meaher and Foster in Mobile for illegal slave importation, but the case was dismissed for lack of evidence from the ship or its manifest, and perhaps because of the outbreak of the Civil War.

Because Captain Foster reported he burned and sank Clotilda in the delta north of Mobile Bay, archaeological searches have continued into the 21st century for the wreck. Several visible wrecks have been referred to by locals as the slave ship. Wreckage from Clotilda was allegedly found in 2018, but the Alabama Historical Commission ruled out the findings because of "major differences between the two vessels," and apparent lack of any fire damage. In May 2019, the Alabama Historical Commission announced the wreck had finally been found by researcher Ben Raines, showing "physical and forensic evidence [that] powerfully suggests that this is the Clotilda."

=== Africatown ===
The Africans of the Clotilda were effectively emancipated at the end of the Civil War. As did many freedmen, Redoshi and William stayed with their daughter at the plantation in Bogue Chitto and continued to work there.

Many of Meaher's former enslaved people returned to Magazine Point, and to land owned by Meaher on the Mobile-Tensaw River Delta just north of Mobile and on the west bank of the Mobile River. They founded the all-black community of Africatown, and attracted other ethnic Africans to join them in the independent community. They adopted community rules based on mostly "Takpa/Tapa" (Nupe) customs, and chose leaders. Some maintained the use of the Yoruba language and cultural traditions into the 1950s.

Children born in the community began to learn English, first at church, and then in schools that were founded in the late nineteenth century. Cudjo Lewis lived until 1935 and was long thought to be the last survivor of the Clotilda. In 2019, a new study established that Redoshi (Sally Smith) lived until 1937 in Bogue Chitto, and she was thus considered the last survivor. But in 2020 it was announced that Matilda McCrear had survived until 1940, when she died in Selma, Alabama.

The community of Africatown grew to 12,000 as new industry attracted workers to the upper river, including paper mills built after World War II. But with closing industries and job losses, the population has declined to about 2,000 in the early twenty-first century. In the postwar period, the area was mostly absorbed into a neighborhood of Mobile, with part in the neighboring town of Prichard. In 2012 the Africatown Historic District was recognized and listed on the National Register of Historic Places. Their cemetery is also listed.

== Finding the wreck ==
External videos
- Q&A interview with Ben Raines on his book The Last Slave Ship: The True Story of How Clotilda Was Found, Her Descendants, and an Extraordinary Reckoning, January 30, 2022, C-SPAN

In January 2018, reporter Ben Raines identified what was originally believed to be the wreckage of the Clotilda in the lower Mobile–Tensaw Delta, a few miles north of the city of Mobile. Record low tides, caused by a storm system that produced a blizzard, had left parts of a wreck visible above the mud. People in Africatown began to discuss what should be done with the wreckage if it was the Clotilda, and how best to tell their story.

However, by March 2018, researchers determined that the wreckage discovered by Raines was not Clotilda. The National Park Service did designate the wreck that Raines discovered (of a ship almost twice as large as the Clotilda) as the Twelvemile Island Ship Graveyard Historical and Archaeological District.

A few weeks later, Raines and a team from the University of Southern Mississippi returned to the river and performed the first survey of the 12 Mile Island section of the Mobile River. A week later, Raines and Monty Graham, head of Marine Sciences at the University of Southern Mississippi, explored several of the 11 wrecks identified in the survey, along with Joe Turner and a team from Underwater Works Dive Shop. On April 13, Ben Raines pulled up the first piece of Clotilda to see the light of day in 160 years. The coordinates and survey data were shared with the Alabama Historical Commission, which hired Search Inc., to verify the find. The discovery was kept secret for a year, until the verification process was complete.

On May 22, 2019, the Alabama Historical Commission announced that the wreckage of the Clotilda had been found.

== Representation in media ==
The Clotilda has been frequently portrayed in the media. Margaret Brown's 2008 documentary film The Order of Myths revealed that the queens of the two major, segregated Mardi Gras organizations in 2007 had a poignant link: the ancestors of the MCA queen had smuggled the ancestors of the MAMGA queen into Mobile Bay as slaves on the Clotilda. Brown followed up in 2022 with Descendant, a documentary film that looks into the Africatown community today, including the environmental and societal inequities still present after 160 years, and the impact the Clotilda's 2019 discovery had on the area. Produced by Netflix, it premiered at the 2022 Sundance Film Festival. Henry Louis Gates Jr.'s Finding Your Roots, Season 4, Episode 9 (December 12, 2017), showed census data for Mobile, and Captain William Foster's journal from the Clotilda, during a segment explaining the family history of Questlove, a drummer and music producer, joint frontman of the hip hop group The Roots. His great-great-great-grandparents Charles Lewis (born c. 1820) and his wife Maggie (born 1830) were among the slaves brought from West Africa on the Clotilda. Gates found an article in The Pittsburgh Post of April 15, 1894 recounting the wager that Captain Timothy Meaher had made in 1859 that he could smuggle in slaves within two years, and one from The Tarboro Daily Southerner of July 14, 1860 that 110 Africans had arrived in Mobile on Clotilda.

In 2018, Zora Neale Hurston's book Barracoon was published, after lacking a publisher since its completion in 1931. An account of Cudjo Lewis' life story, it also discusses her feelings as an African-American researcher interviewing and getting to know him. It is an example of a "testimonial text". The song "Clotilda's on Fire," on Shemekia Copeland's 2020 album Uncivil War, deals with the vessel and her human cargo.

== See also ==
- List of slave ships
- Wanderer, a slave ship that arrived November 1858
