= Hannah Durkin =

British historian

Hannah Durkin is a British historian and academic, specialising in the transatlantic slave trade and African diaspora. Having been a Leverhulme Trust early career fellow at the University of Nottingham from 2013 to 2016, she became a lecturer in literature and film at Newcastle University. She was awarded the 2025 Wolfson History Prize for her book Survivors: The Lost Stories of the Last Captives of the Atlantic Slave Trade. She has twice rediscovered the last surviving enslaved person brought from Africa to the United States in the 19th Century: Redoshi Smith (died 1937) and then Matilda McCrear (died 1940).

== Selected works ==
- Bernier, Celeste-Marie; Durkin, Hannah, eds. (2016). Visualising slavery: art across the African diaspora. Liverpool: Liverpool University Press. ISBN 978-1781382677.
- Durkin, Hannah (2019). Josephine Baker and Katherine Dunham: dances in literature and cinema. Champaign, IL: University of Illinois Press. ISBN 978-0252042621.
- Durkin, Hannah (2 July 2020). "Uncovering The Hidden Lives of Last Clotilda Survivor Matilda McCrear and Her Family". Slavery & Abolition. 41 (3): 431–457. doi:10.1080/0144039X.2020.1741833.
- Bernier, Celeste-Marie; Rice, Alan; Himid, Lubaina; Durkin, Hannah (2019). Inside the invisible: memorialising slavery and freedom in the life and works of Lubaina Himid. Liverpool Studies in International Slavery: 14. Liverpool: Liverpool University Press. ISBN 978-1789620948.
- Durkin, Hannah (2024). Survivors: the lost stories of the last captives of the Atlantic slave trade. London: William Collins. ISBN 978-0008446512.
