= List of last survivors of American slavery =

Slavery existed in the United States from its inception in 1619 to its abolition with the passage of the Thirteenth Amendment to the United States Constitution on December 6, 1865, under which it was abolished nationally. The last known survivors who were born into legalized slavery or enslaved prior to the passage of the amendment are listed below. The list also contains the last known survivors in various states which abolished legal slavery prior to 1865. Some birth dates are difficult to verify due to lack of birth documentation for most enslaved individuals.

== List of last survivors of American slavery ==
Name	Image	Birth	Death	Notes and references
Elizabeth Cash Green		June 2, 1862	February 20, 1975	Per surviving family, was born in Midland, Georgia in 1862, moved to Arkansas in 1882, and died Helena, Arkansas in 1975.
Peter Mills		October 26, 1861	September 22, 1972	Born in Prince George's County, Maryland, and died after a pedestrian accident in Pittsburgh, Allegheny County, Pennsylvania.
Sylvester Magee		May 29, 1841?	October 15, 1971	Said to have died at the age of 130 years old in Columbia, Marion County, Mississippi.
William Casby		January 19, 1857	August 17, 1970	Photographed on March 24, 1963, by Richard Avedon in Algiers, New Orleans, Orleans Parish, Louisiana, with multiple generations of his family.
Mary Hardway Walker		May 6, 1848?	December 1, 1969	Said to have lived to 121 years old. She moved from Union Springs, Bullock County, Alabama, to Chattanooga, Hamilton County, Tennessee, where a newspaper article was published about her learning to read in 1966 at age 116.
Anna J. Cooper		August 10, 1858	February 27, 1964	Anna Cooper was a notable academic and activist who was born in slavery Raleigh, Wake County, North Carolina.
Josephus		pre-1865	after August 28, 1963	Listed in a bulletin for Martin Luther King Jr.'s 1963 March on Washington. At the time, believed to be the last surviving American slave.
Jeff Doby	This is Jefferson Doby, a former enslaved man who was born in 1858 and was interviewed by the Camden Chronicle at age 103. He would live 2 more years. He was blind by this age hence why his eyes are closed.	February 6, 1858	March 26, 1963	Believed to be the oldest living person in South Carolina at the time of 1961 and one of the last living former slaves in South Carolina. Jeff was born in Camden, Kershaw County, and died at the age of 105 in 1963. He was featured in the local newspaper after his 103rd birthday and photographed. Two of his sons would also live to be nearly 100 years old.
Fountain Hughes		1859	July 4, 1957	Former slave freed in 1865 after the American Civil War. Descendant of Betty Hemings, slave matriarch at Thomas Jefferson's plantation Monticello. Hughes was interviewed in June 1949 about his life by the Library of Congress as part of the Federal Writers' Project of oral histories of former slaves persons. The recorded interview is available online through the Library of Congress and the World Digital Library.
Alfred "Teen" Blackburn		April 26, 1842	March 8, 1951	Received a Confederate pension in 1929 for accompanying his owner during the Civil War; resided in North Carolina.
John Wesley Washington		c. 1843	May 15, 1951	Said to be the last surviving former slave living in Washington, D.C.
John Thomas Moore		c. 1843	February 26, 1950	Born in Huntsville, Alabama, said to have served on the side of the Union in the American Civil War, specifically in a battle between Joseph Wheeler and Gordon Granger.
Eliza Moore		1843	January 21, 1948	One of the last verified surviving American slaves; resided in North Carolina.
William Andrew Johnson		February 8, 1858	May 16, 1943	Believed to be the last surviving person enslaved by a U.S. President (Andrew Johnson); visited FDR at the White House in 1937.
Adeline Dade		1853	December 1941	Possibly one of the last living former slaves in New York.
Harriet Wilson Whitely		March 15, 1855	April 26, 1941	The last living former slave in Fairmont, Fairmont County, West Virginia.
Matilda McCrear		1857	January 1940	The last known survivor of the Clotilda in 1859–1860, the last trans-Atlantic slave ship to arrive in America from Africa.
Redoshi		1848	1937	The next to last known survivor of the Clotilda, the last slave ship to arrive in America.
Delia Garlic		1837	1937 at the earliest	Born in Virginia; was purportedly 100 years old during an interview with Margaret Fowler in the late 1930s. Date of death is unclear.
Cudjoe Lewis		1841	July 17, 1935	One of the last survivors of the Clotilda, the last slave ship to arrive in America.
Perry Lockwood		ca. 1844	1929	Said to be one of the last living former slaves in lower Delaware; died aged 87.
Reuben Freeman		c. 1835	c. 1915	One of the last slaves in Somerset County, New Jersey; lived in Somerville; was enslaved to William Annin of Liberty Corner. Likely other later survivors because final slaves were not emancipated until 1865 in New Jersey.
Julius Lemons		c. 1850	after 1915	Said to be the last survivor of the Wanderer
David Hendrickson		1799	1900	Said to be the last living former slave sold "on the block" in New Jersey. Likely other later survivors because final slaves were not emancipated until 1865 in New Jersey.
Louise Tritton		ca. 1780	1891	One of the last living former slaves in Connecticut, and oldest person in New Haven, New Haven County.
Adjua D'Wolf		1794	1868	Said to be the last surviving slave in Rhode Island. Adjua was enslaved in Africa, brought to Bristol, Bristol County, Rhode Island, in 1803 and sold to the D'Wolf family, a family of slave traders, after new enslavement was made illegal in Rhode Island. Her death in 1868 was noted in several newspapers around the country, including in the South. James Howland (1758–1859) was also one of Rhode Island's last legal former slaves, and was enslaved until 1842. D'Wolf and Howland are likely not the last slaves, due to RI's gradual emancipation with several legally slaves still listed in the 1840 census, and likely enslaved until the 1843 RI Constitution banned all slavery.
Hannah Kelley		ca. 1760	January 15, 1864	Died at 103 years old in Cross Creek, Cross Creek Township, Washington County, Pennsylvania, as possibly the last living former slave in Pennsylvania, formerly enslaved by John Gardner of Jefferson, Jefferson County.
Margaret Pint		1778	1857	Purportedly the last living former slave in New York; she was born into slavery in Westchester County. Likely not the last living former slave, because final emancipation in New York did not occur until July 5, 1827.
Venus Rowe		ca. 1754	1844	Purportedly one of the last living former slaves in Massachusetts, resided in Burlington, Middlesex County.

== Discredited ==
Name	Image	Birth	Death	Notes and references
Charlie Smith		1842 (claimed) or 1874 or 1879	October 5, 1979	Allegedly born in Liberia or United States of America, claimed to be the last Civil War veteran and slave, among other false claims. Discredited and died in Florida in 1979.
Mary Duckworth		1861 (claimed), likely between 1874 and 1880	April 20, 1983	Allegedly born into slavery, but discredited due to census and social security records reporting other later birth dates.

== See also ==
- List of slaves
- Peter Fossett – Former slave (1815–1901), said to be the last survivor of enslavement by Thomas Jefferson
