= Sylvester Magee =

Claimed last surviving American slave

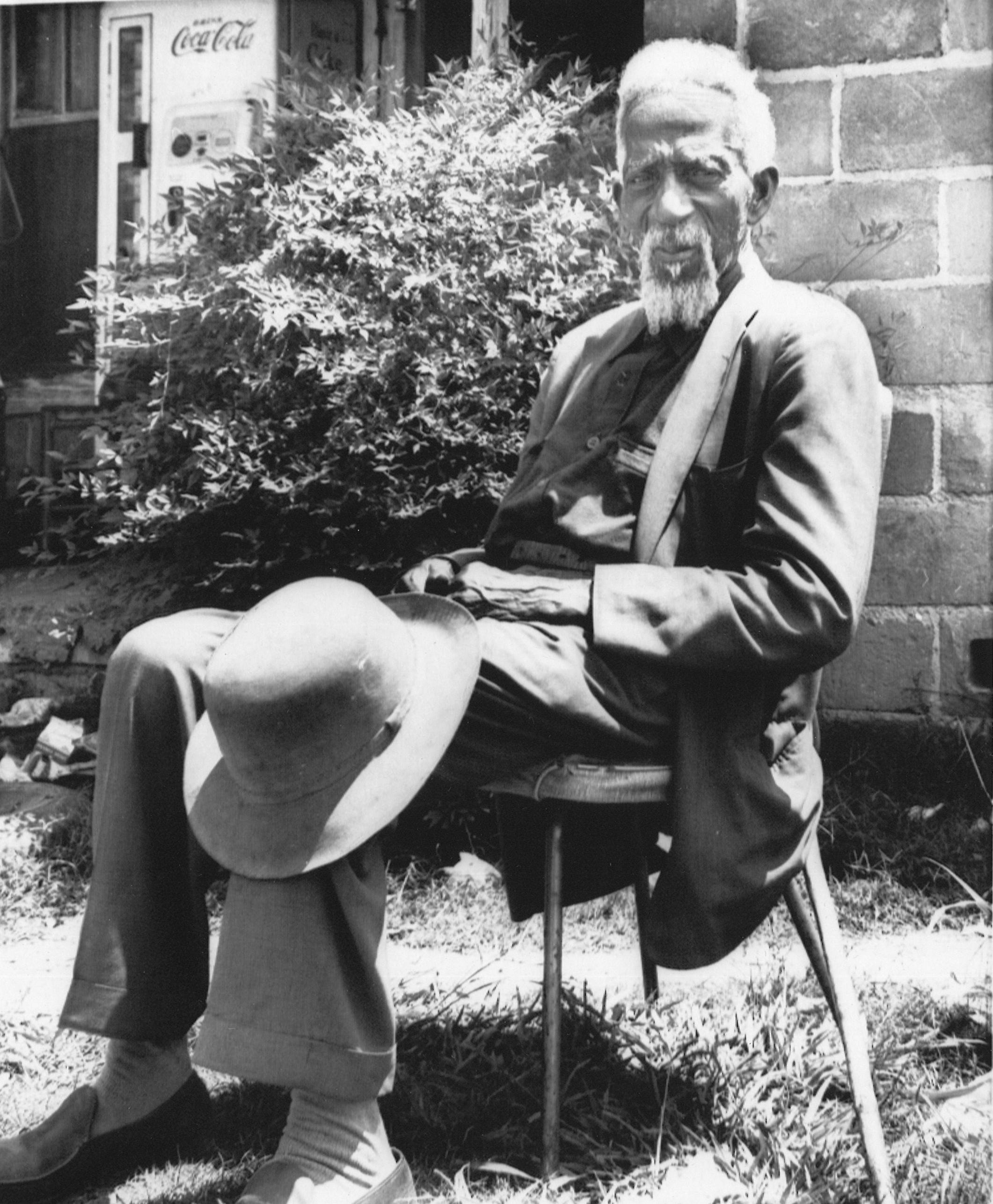
- Magee in 1967
- Born: Sylvester Magee; May 29, 1841 (allegedly); North Carolina, U.S.
- Died: October 15, 1971 (supposedly aged 130); Columbia, Mississippi, U.S.
- Known for: Claimed to be the last surviving American slave and the last surviving American Civil War Veteran
- Children: 7 children
- Parents: Ephraim (father); Jeanette (mother)

Sylvester Magee (allegedly born May 29, 1841 – died October 15, 1971) was an American man who received much publicity as the last living former American slave. He was accepted for treatment by the Mississippi Veterans Hospital as a veteran of the American Civil War.

== Life ==
According to Magee, he was born in North Carolina in 1841 to two enslaved people named Ephraim and Jeanette, who were held and worked on the J.J. Shanks plantation. He said that at the age of 19, just before the American Civil War, he was purchased at a slave market in Enterprise, Mississippi by Hugh Magee, the owner of a plantation in Covington County, Mississippi. Sylvester reportedly adopted the Magee surname, a common practice among enslaved people at the time. Shortly afterwards, as recounted by Magee, he was sold again to Victor Steen of Rankin County, Mississippi, but ultimately ran away in 1863 and was enlisted in the Union Army, taking part in the assault on Vicksburg, Mississippi. Magee later stated that he had been forced to serve in both the Confederate and Union armies as a servant and laborer, though no documentary evidence for this has been found.

After interviewing him in 1964, Alfred P. Andrews, an amateur historian and founder of the Jackson Mississippi Civil War Round Table, helped draw public attention to Magee's story, having become convinced of its veracity. He stated that Magee talked with "rare intelligence and seldom rambled" in recounting his participation in the Civil War. Andrews helped Magee be classified as a Civil War veteran, although no service records for him could be found. In March 1966, when Magee was suffering from pneumonia, Andrews helped him obtain treatment from the Mississippi Veterans Hospital.

On Magee's purported 124th birthday, the citizens of Collins, Mississippi held a party at a country grocery store, complete with a five-layer cake and 124 candles. Governor Paul B. Johnson, Jr. declared it "Sylvester Magee Day". Many national news articles reported on Magee's life and longevity, including the magazines Time and Jet. He appeared on the Mike Douglas Show and was flown to Philadelphia, Pennsylvania for another televised appearance. He was proclaimed as the oldest living United States citizen by a life insurance company and received a birthday card from President Lyndon B. Johnson, and was also recognized by President Richard M. Nixon.

Jet reported that "some historians have stated it would have been impossible for a person who neither reads nor writes to have related the stories of the Civil War in such detail as Magee without having served in the conflict". Magee told the Philadelphia Daily News that he had four wives, three of whom he outlived, and fathered 7 children, the last at the purported age of 109. He also said that his father lived to 123 and his mother to 122. However, in a later interview he stated that he had only ever had one wife, with whom he had 14 children and that his father had died at 108.

In a 1966 interview, he stated that he had never drunk alcohol, nor uttered a swear word, although he smoked cigarettes for 108 years. In his later years, he made a living selling automated needle threaders and digging graves. In 1966, he divorced his wife Marie.

== Death and age ==
On October 15, 1971, Sylvester Magee died in Columbia, Mississippi. His funeral was held at John the Baptist Missionary Church on October 19, 1971. He was buried in an unmarked grave in the Pleasant Valley Church Cemetery in nearby Foxworth, Mississippi. In 2011, the Marion County Historical Society provided a marker.

Magee's purported age of 130 has never been verified, as persons born into slavery typically lacked birth certificates. History professor Max Grivno, who has studied Magee's life, characterized the claimed age as "possible ... but extremely unlikely", noting that there was "only one documented case of a person living into their 120s."

== See also ==
- Longevity claims
- Slavery in the United States
- List of the last surviving American slaves
- Alfred "Teen" Blackburn (died 1951), one of the last surviving enslaved Americans
- Cudjoe Lewis (died 1935), one of the last survivors of the trans-Atlantic slave trade
- Maria do Carmo Gerônimo (died 2000), last surviving enslaved Brazilian
- Eliza Moore (died 1948), one of the last living African Americans proven to have been born into slavery in the United States.
- Charlie Smith (died 1979), another individual who claimed to be a supercentenarian born into slavery, who died later than Magee

== Sources ==
- Bobbie E. Barbee and Leahmon L. Reid, "Why 125-Year-Old Husband Sues for Divorce", Jet Magazine, March 30, 1967, pp. 46–49
- "Gerontology: Secret of Long Life", Time Magazine, 14 July 1967
- "Funeral Services Held Tuesday For The Last American Slave", Columbian-Progress obituary, October 21, 1971
- "America's Oldest Citizen Dies in Mississippi at 130", Jet, 4 November 1971, p. 10, reprinted in Magee, Kenneth F. (April 1994). The Magee Family History; As I Found Them. Copy in State of Mississippi Archives: Self Published, 1994. p. 44.
