= Aaron James (American football) =

American football coach (born 1979)

Biographical details
- Born: September 14, 1979 (age 47); Prichard, Alabama, U.S.
- Education: Tuskegee University (2002)

Playing career
- 1998–2001: Tuskegee
- 2004: Alabama Lightning
- Position: Quarterback

Coaching career (HC unless noted)
- 2002–2003: Tuskegee (GA)
- 2004: Bullock County HS (AL) (AHC/OC)
- 2005–2008: Clark Atlanta (QB)
- 2009–2010: Lane (QB)
- 2011–2014: Miles (WR)
- 2015–2017: Miles (QB)
- 2018–2020: Miles (OC/QB)
- 2021: Bethune–Cookman (OC)
- 2022: Tuskegee (OC)
- 2023–2026: Tuskegee

Head coaching record
- Overall: 18–20

Accomplishments and honors

Awards
- All-SIAC (2001)

Aaron James (born September 14, 1979) is an American college football coach. He served as the head football coach for Tuskegee University from 2023 to 2026, and previously played quarterback for the school.

He also coached for Bullock County High School, Clark Atlanta, Lane, Miles, and Bethune–Cookman.

== Early life and playing career ==
James was born in Prichard, Alabama, and played high school football for Mattie T. Blount High School in Eight Mile, Alabama, as a quarterback. As a senior he compiled a 14–0 record and won an Alabama state championship.

James played college football for Tuskegee University from 1998 to 2001. During his career he compiled a 42–5 record as a starter including back-to-back black college football national championships in 2000 and 2001.

In 2004, James signed with the Alabama Lightning of the North American Football League (NAFL).

== Coaching career ==
James began his coaching career following his graduation from Tuskegee as a graduate assistant for two years. Following his stint with the Alabama Lightning he became the assistant head coach and offensive coordinator for Bullock County High School.

In 2005, James was named as the quarterbacks coach for Clark Atlanta University. He stayed in that position until 2008. In 2009, he was hired by Lane College as the team's quarterbacks coach.

In 2011, James was hired by Miles College as the team's wide receivers coach. After four years he was promoted to quarterbacks coach before being promoted again in 2018 to offensive coordinator while maintaining his role as quarterbacks coach.

In 2021, James was hired by Bethune–Cookman University as offensive coordinator under head football coach Terry Sims.

=== Tuskegee ===
In 2022, James returned to his alma mater, Tuskegee, as the offensive coordinator under Reginald Ruffin who he had previously worked under while at Miles.

Following the conclusion of the 2022 season, Ruffin announced his retirement and James was hired as his replacement on January 10, 2023.

In James's first season, Tuskegee started the year projected to finish third in the Southern Intercollegiate Athletic Conference (SIAC). In the season opener, Tuskegee defeated Fort Valley State 37–31 in the Red Tails Classic. The following week, the Golden Tigers visited Kentucky State and won 36–10 in the first week of SIAC play. In the home-opener and Hall of Fame Game, Tuskegee hosted Central State and won 27–21. On September 30, 2023, Tuskegee visited Division I FCS opponent Alabama A&M and lost 3–58. In the annual Morehouse Tuskegee Classic, Tuskegee outlasted Morehouse 40–28 to win back-to-back years and their tenth win all-time. On homecoming, Tuskegee hosted Edward Waters and lost 38–41. The Golden Tigers finished the year by playing in the Turkey Day Classic against Alabama State. They lost 3–41 and it was their fourth-consecutive loss to ASU. In his inaugural season as a head coach, James lead the Golden Tigers to a 7–4 record and finished tied second in the conference.

Despite the successful first season, the Golden Tigers suffered consecutive losing seasons in 2024 and 2025. After the 2026 campaign began with a 2–3 start, James was fired on October 7. His last game was a 30–28 loss to Morehouse.

== Personal life ==
James is married to Rosie and they have two daughters.

== Head coaching record ==
Year	Team	Overall	Conference	Standing	Bowl/playoffs
Tuskegee Golden Tigers (Southern Intercollegiate Athletic Conference) (2023–present)
2023	Tuskegee	7–4	6–2	T–2nd	
2024	Tuskegee	5–6	5–3	5th	
2025	Tuskegee	4–7	3–5	T–7th	
2026	Tuskegee	2–3 (Note: Tuskegee fired James after five games.)	2–1		
Tuskegee:		16–17	14–10		
Total:		16–17			
