= Foster House (Union Springs, Alabama) =

Historic house in Alabama, United States

- U.S. National Register of Historic Places
- Alabama Register of Landmarks and Heritage
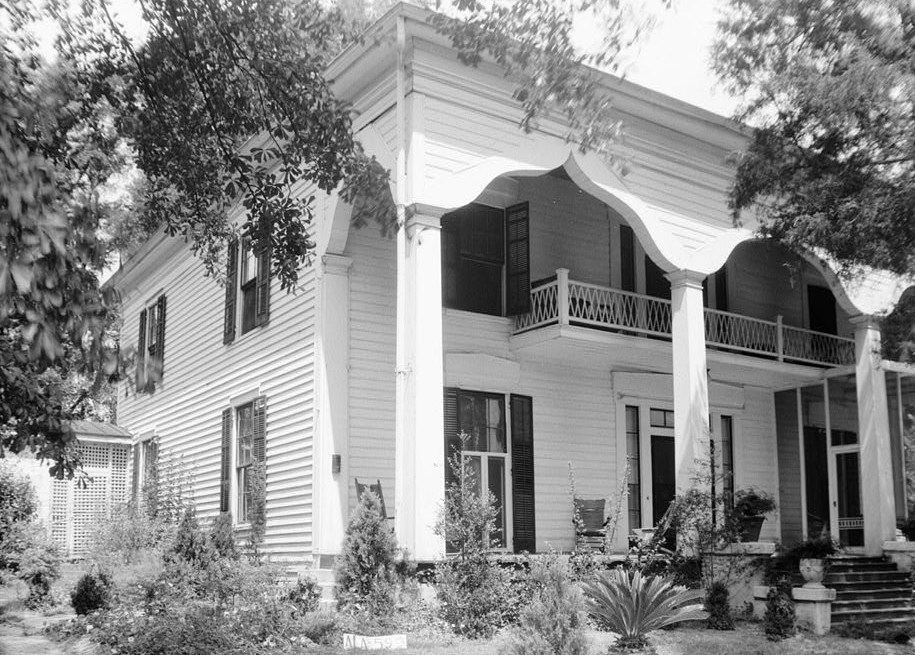
- The Foster House as photographed by the Historic American Buildings Survey in 1935

- Location within Alabama Location within the United States
- Location: 201 Kennon St., Union Springs, Alabama
- Coordinates: 32°8′41″N 85°43′17″W
- Area: 1 acre (0.40 ha)
- Built: 1854
- Architect: Sterling J. Foster
- Architectural style: Greek Revival, Exotic Revival
- NRHP reference No.: 98001021

Significant dates
- Added to NRHP: August 14, 1998
- Designated ARLH: September 14, 1977

The Foster House in Union Springs, Alabama, United States, is the best example of Moorish Revival architecture in Alabama. The house was built by Dr. Sterling J. Foster, a physician, who built the house over five years from 1854. The house remained in the Foster family until 1947.

The two-story wood-frame house is capped by a low-slope hipped roof. Its chief distinguishing feature is a two-story three-bay front porch with a deep spandrel at the top. The spandrel is cut out with ogee arches. A small balcony spans the upper level over the center-hall entrance. Double doors at the main entrance and off the balcony open into a center hall. There are two rooms on either side of the hall on both levels. A half-octagonal addition from 1896 houses bathrooms on both levels. Interior woodwork is mainly the house's original Greek Revival trim.

The Foster House was placed on the National Register of Historic Places on August 14, 1998.
