= William Andrew Johnson =

Formerly enslaved American pastry chef (1858–1943)

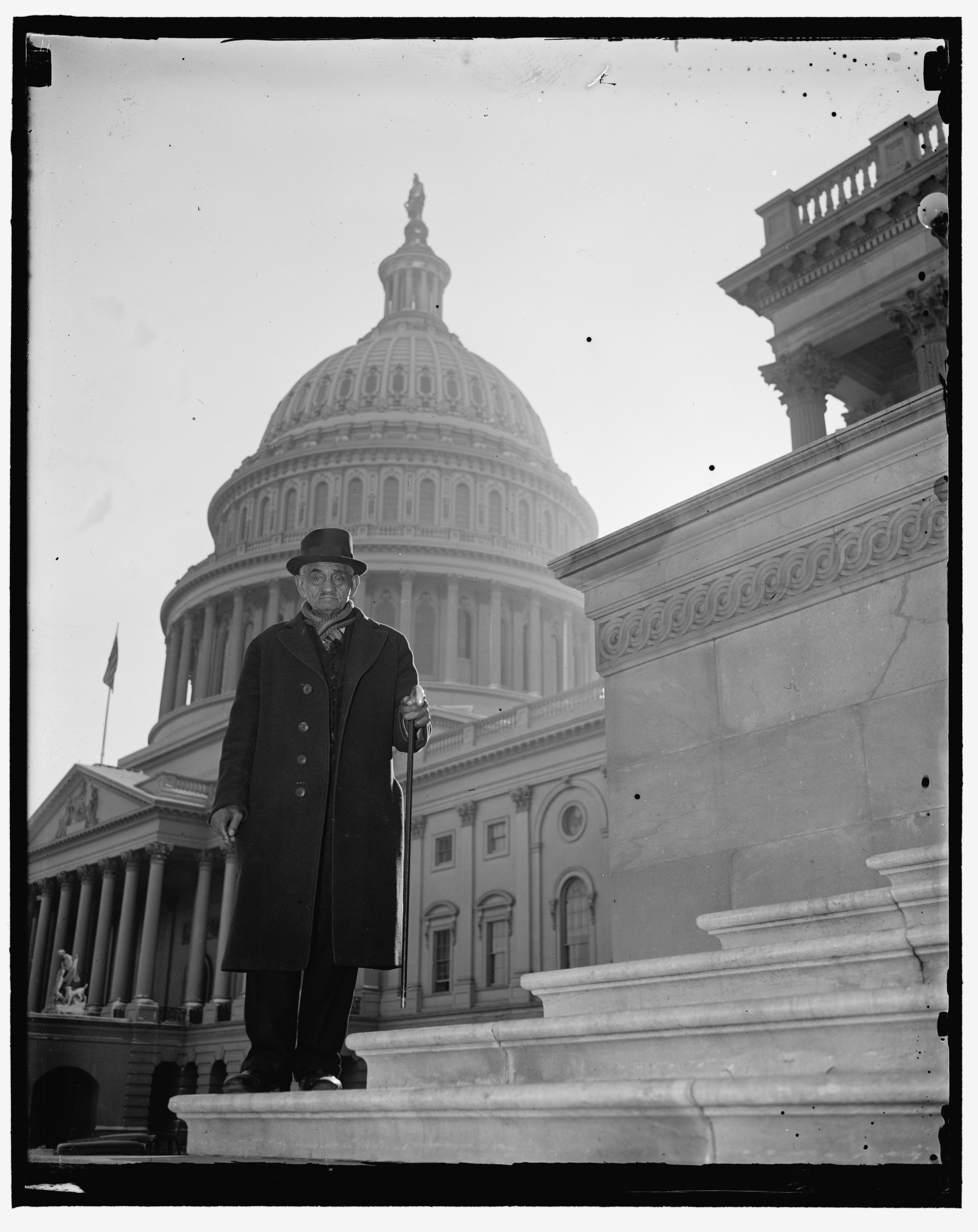
- Johnson at the U.S. Capitol during his 1937 trip to Washington, D.C., by Harris & Ewing
- Born: February 8, 1858; Greeneville, Tennessee, U.S.
- Died: May 16, 1943 (aged 85); Knoxville, Tennessee, U.S.
- Mother: Dolly Johnson
- Relatives: Florence Johnson Smith (sister); Elizabeth Johnson Forby (sister); Sam Johnson (uncle)

William Andrew Johnson (February 8, 1858 (Note: In 1938, a newspaper reported that Johnson would be celebrating his birthday on October 8 and that he thought he was 81. His age varies continuously in news reports. February 8, 1858 is the birthday that appeared on his death certificate; the year, at least, matches reports of William A. Johnson's age at the time of Andrew Johnson's succession to the presidency and his death.) – May 16, 1943) was a lifelong Tennessean who was primarily employed as a restaurant cook. He was described as a "quiet, bright-eyed" man, a "great favorite" in Knoxville, and (per the Indianapolis Recorder in 1941) he was "regarded by many as the best pastry chef in East Tennessee." William Andrew Johnson was believed to be the last surviving American to have been enslaved by a U.S. president. Johnson, his two sisters Florence and Elizabeth, his mother Dolly and his Uncle Sam were all once legally the property of Andrew Johnson, who became the 17th President of the United States following the assassination of Abraham Lincoln in 1865. In later years, when describing his lifelong relationships with Johnson's children, grandchildren, and great-grandchildren, Johnson said "They treat me just like I was one of the family."

Local media covered Johnson and his recollections of the late President with some regularity beginning in the 1920s, although the coverage often described Johnson in fairly patronizing terms. William A. Johnson made national headlines in 1937 when he visited the White House at the invitation of President Franklin D. Roosevelt, who gave him a silver-handled cane engraved with both of their names. Meeting Roosevelt one-on-one had been a dream of Johnson's since at least 1934, when he told a local reporter, "I feel like he's one of my kin folks, since I used to stay in the White House, too."

== Biography ==
=== Early life ===
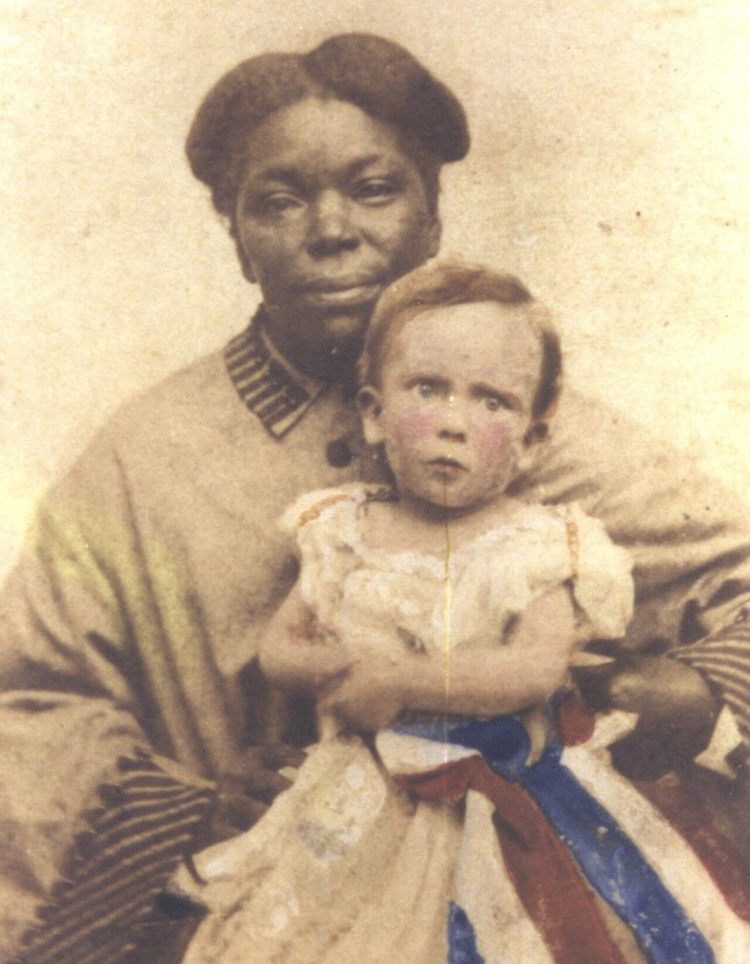
Johnson's mother, Dolly Johnson, holding Andrew Johnson Stover, ca. 1861

William A. Johnson was born at the home of Andrew Johnson in Greeneville, Tennessee in 1858 during the waning days of the Old South. He was born enslaved due to an antebellum American legal principle called partus sequitur ventrem, which meant that since his mother was a slave, he was one, too. He was Dolly Johnson's only son, born roughly a decade after his older sisters Liz and Florence. Per Jesse J. Holland in The Invisibles: The Untold Story of African American Slaves in the White House, this child received two Johnson family names. William was the first name of Andrew Johnson's "beloved brother," and Andrew was, of course, the first name of former Tennessee governor Andrew Johnson, just then the newly elected junior U.S. Senator from Tennessee. In 1932, reporter Bert Vincent quoted Johnson as saying, "Massa named hisself. He called me William Andrew."

Andrew Johnson's great-granddaughter Margaret Johnson Patterson stated in 1943 that William Andrew Johnson was the only one of Dolly's children to be born in Greeneville, where Andrew and Eliza Johnson had their family home. The father of William Andrew Johnson is identified on his death certificate as Andrew Johnson's fourth-born child with Eliza, Robert Johnson, making him Andrew Johnson’s grandson. (Note: However, although Robert Johnson was indeed identified on William Andrew Johnson's death certificate as his father, multiple historians have also speculated that Andrew Johnson was the actual father.) In a 1927 interview, a newspaper account stated that "[William Johnson's] dearest playmate was a grandson of the president, and no great distinction was made between the two small boys, the white boy claiming as ancestors his grandfather, the chief leader of the nation, and his grandmother the first lady of the land, while the other little boy was a slave, born in bondage, the property of the little white boy's grandfather." The little white boy in question is most likely Andrew Johnson Patterson, born 1857 to David T. Patterson and his wife Martha Johnson, oldest daughter of Andrew and Eliza Johnson. One of Andrew Johnson's granddaughters gave William A. Johnson piano lessons at 10 a.m. daily. Eliza McCardle Johnson and Martha Johnson Patterson also helped teach William A. Johnson some of the cooking skills that sustained him in later life. After one of his regular lunches with Andrew Johnson's granddaughter, (Note: Margaret Patterson was actually a granddaughter-in-law, by way of marriage to Andrew Johnson Patterson, son of U.S. Senator David T. Patterson and Andrew Johnson's oldest daughter, Martha Patterson.) he told a reporter in 1936: "Her own mammy and her grandmammy, too, taught me how to make pies and chicken dumplings and corn muffins. Miss Johnson sure did like her good cookin' and Miss Patterson did too."

In the late 1920s, William Johnson recalled living on Cedar Street in Nashville when Andrew Johnson was military governor of Tennessee amidst the ongoing American Civil War. He told a reporter a story of that era: "He was trying to keep Tennessee in the Union, and as he spoke on the capitol grounds, two shots were fired at him by secessionists. The bullets entered trees near him...My mother had me with her near Marse Andrew when the shots were fired. She took me and ran as fast as she could, not stopping until she got to the basement of the house, which was on Cedar Street."

Andrew Johnson is said to have freed his personal slaves on August 8, 1863, although, as William Johnson told it some 70 years later, it was actually Eliza Johnson who broke the news: "Mrs. Johnson called us all in and said we were free now. She said we were free to go or could stay if we wanted to. We all stayed."

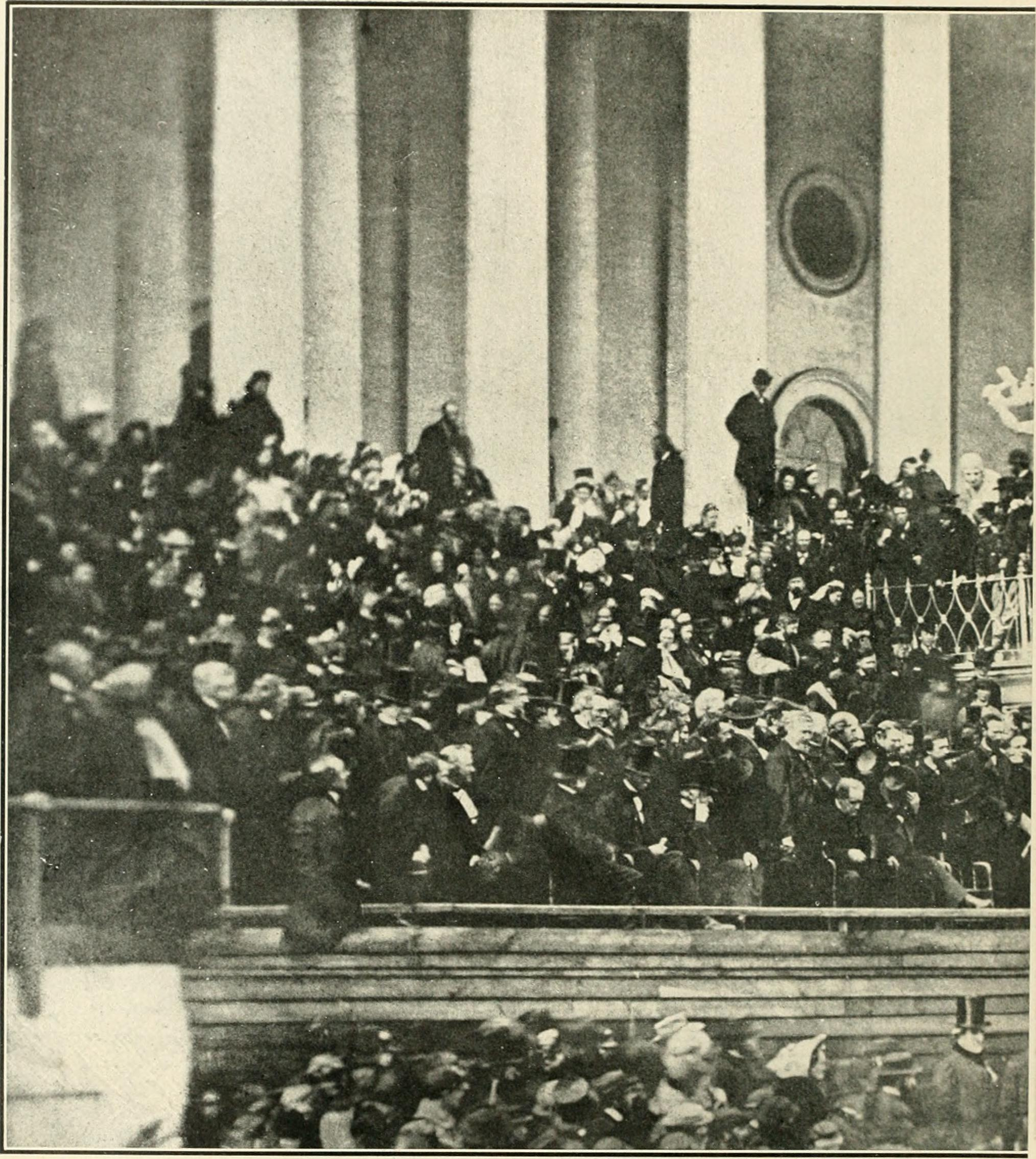
Alexander Gardner took this photo of Lincoln's second inauguration at the U.S. Capitol. Andrew Johnson was quite drunk for his own swearing-in earlier in the morning; he is the individual in the front row, far right, holding his hat over his face. Lincoln was assassinated 42 days later and Johnson succeeded him as President of the United States. (The Photographic History of the Civil War, 1911)

According to Andrew Johnson's great-granddaughter Margaret Johnson Patterson in 1943, William and his mother Dolly stayed in Tennessee while most of the rest of the family moved to the White House in Washington, D.C. in 1865. According to a 1929 interview with William Johnson, he was living with Andrew Johnson's family in Nashville when Lincoln was assassinated; he recalled how "the missus," Eliza McCardle, was "horror-stricken." Per William Johnson, he did go to Washington when Johnson was installed in the White House, "There Marse Andrew made me his body servant, and I was with him until he died...When his suits needed pressing he would order me to heat the big flat iron and he would do his pressing. I guess it was the same iron he used to press suits with when he was a tailor in Greeneville...I used to sleep by the door of his bedroom. He would go to bed generally about 9:30, but every night about 12 he would get up and walk the floor for half an hour or more. Seemed like he was thinking. Sometimes he would mutter things out loud. Then he would go back to bed and sleep soundly." Johnson also recalled, "My ol' missus used to make good cakes. Missus Johnson, when she was here in the White House, she go back in the kitchen and do her own danged way." In the late 1930s, Johnson recalled some of his work in service to the Johnsons:

William Andrew told something of how he used to serve way back yonder in the days of hoop skirts, bustles, side whiskers and mustache cups. Back in the old days when eating was sure enough eating. ¶ "I always served a drink with each course" he said. "Claret cup was the favorite. Course if church folks minded we wouldn't have that here." ¶ ...He said serving then wasn't like it is now. He said when guests sat down all the food was on the table. Said the meat then was removed to carving table to one side and that meats were served on individual plates and carried and placed on the plates at the table. "Had lots of small dishes around each plate," he said. "A waiter served sauces into these little dishes just as they were needed." ¶ William said there was a little bell on the table. Said the hostess would set her foot on a little lever beneath the table and ring the bell for a waiter when guest looked like he wanted something. ¶ The coffee, though, William said he'd put that on in style. Said they had a coffee pot shaped like a locomotive. Said it had little whistle on it. Said it rolled around by guests' plates and whistled and stopped and the guest held his cup just in front of the cowcatcher to catch the coffee that came from a little spigot hole. ¶ William said everything was removed from the table for dessert, even the tablecloth. He said too that each guest used three or four new plates in eating. He said washing dishes was a sure big job in the old days.

Per the younger Johnson, "After he came back from Washington I was with him all the time. I slept right in the same room with him." William A. Johnson "became Andrew Johnson's personal servant—we were together on many trips and I usually slept on a cot in his room when we were away from the home at Greeneville."

Andrew Johnson mentioned William Andrew and his sister Elizabeth in the last letter he ever wrote, which was sent to his daughter Mary Johnson Stover ahead of a visit to her house in Carter County, Tennessee: "William is very anxious to come and perhaps I may bring him as he is...desirous to see Liz and the children." William A. Johnson stayed in Andrew Johnson's room after the former president and recently elected U.S. Senator suffered a stroke at his daughter Mary Johnson Stover Brown's home in 1875. William Andrew Johnson was with Johnson through his final illness, hardly sleeping over the course of the former President's decline, and was with him when he died.

I used to sit by the side of his bed day and night. He was paralyzed on one side. He would reach over with his good arm and take hold of his wrist and say, 'Is that your hand, William?' And I'd say, 'No, Mr. Andrew, that's your own hand.' You see he couldn't feel his own hand.

— William A. Johnson, as told to Ernie Pyle, 1937

A contemporary neurologist credits William with astute observation skills and his clinically valuable description of Johnson experiencing "one of the earliest known cases" of the medical condition asomatognosia. Neither William A. Johnson, nor Liz and her children (who were also likely present in the home) were mentioned in newspaper accounts of Johnson's final hours, which otherwise listed the presence of three doctors, Eliza, Martha, Mary, Mary's three children, and Frank.

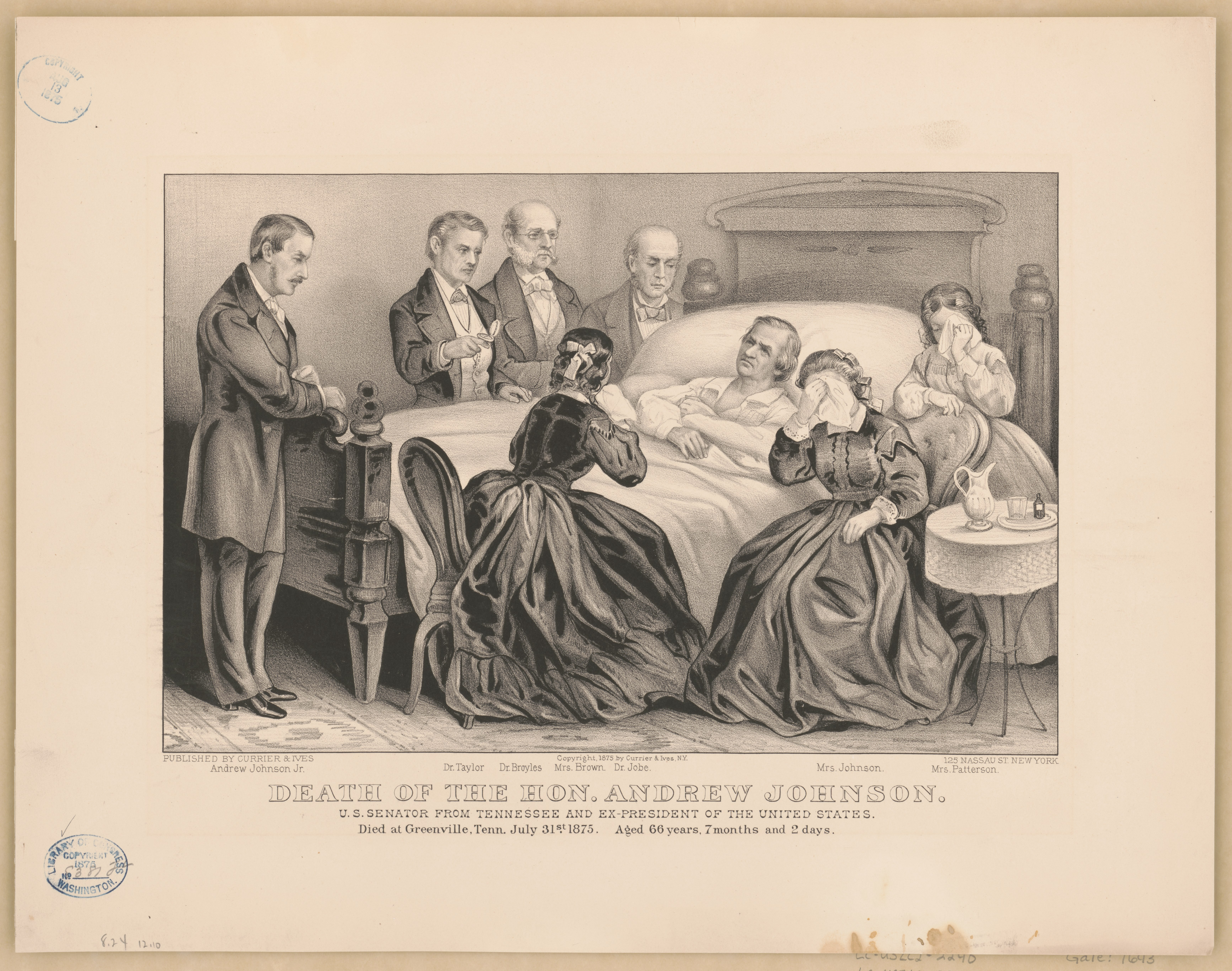
Contemporary newspaper accounts of Johnson's decline and death made no mention of Liz and William Andrew, thus they were also not included in this Currier & Ives lithograph (LOC 91794971)

In 1881, a visitor to Greeneville reported that "some colored people" were living in the old Andrew Johnson tailor shop and were taking good care of the building; this is likely William and his mother Dolly. In the 20th century a Greeneville newspaper stated, "Older citizens will remember the elaborately decorated and delicious cakes that occupied the place of honor at the big parties which the late Col. and Mrs. J. H. Doughty gave, which were baked by William Johnson."

The death date of Johnson's mother, Dolly Johnson, is unknown, but the National Park Service (which administers the Andrew Johnson National Historic Site in Greeneville) estimates that she died between 1890 and 1892. Her children seem to have all departed Greeneville for Knoxville after her death; in 1891, there is an entry in the Knoxville city directory for Johnson, Wm, c, pastry cook Hotel Hattie.

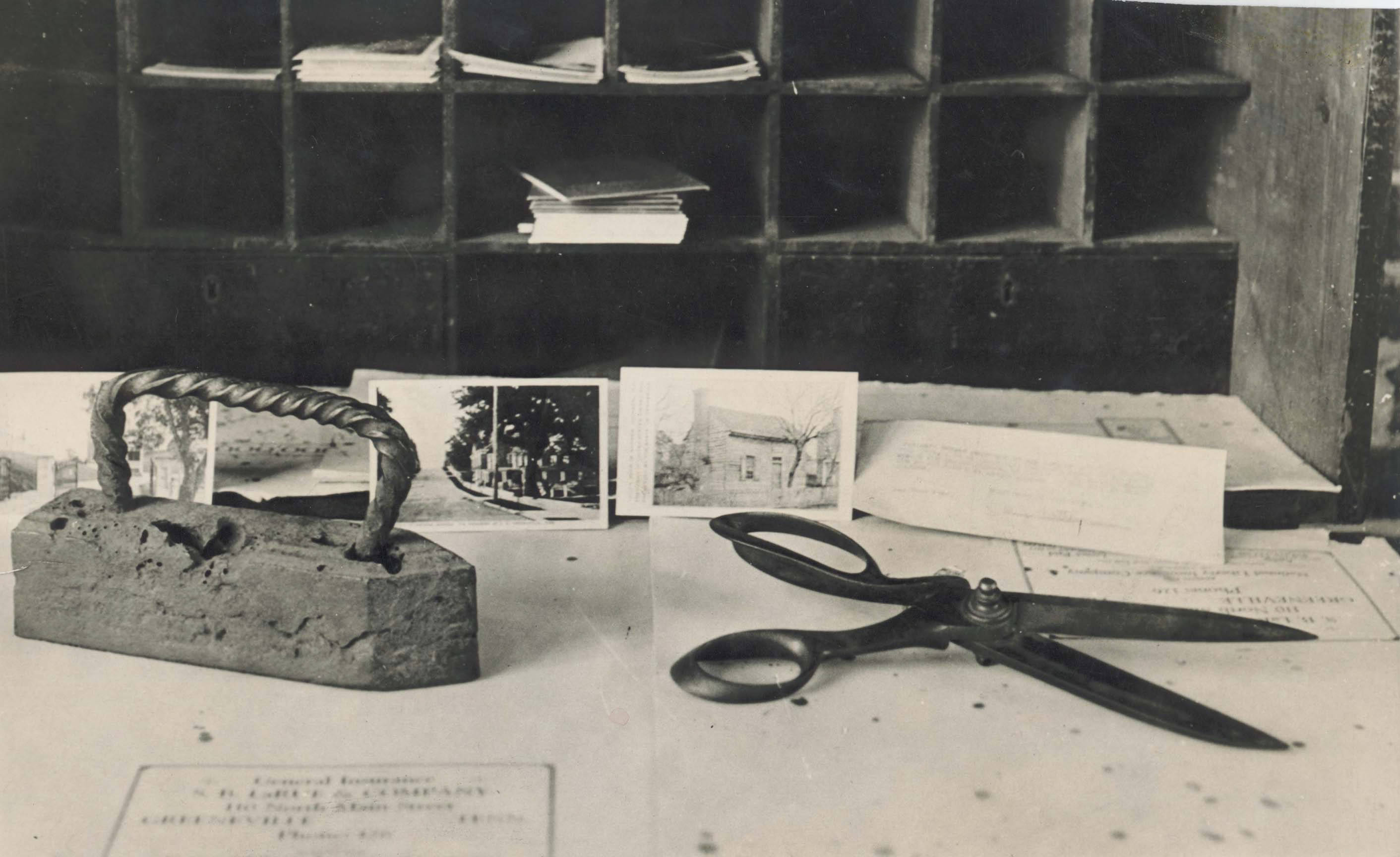
"Shears and goose" are traditional symbols of the tailoring profession; William Andrew Johnson recalled warming up a flat iron, like the one pictured, for pressing Johnson's suits (Andrew Johnson, Plebeian and Patriot, 1928)

=== Turn of the century ===
In the early 1900s, Johnson worked baking cakes and pies at a Tennessee business called Hattie House. Later in life he recalled that U.S. President Theodore Roosevelt stayed at the Cumberland Hotel when he visited East Tennessee. In 1910 he was living in the household of his sister Florence Johnson Smith and his niece Mabel Smith at the corner of McGhee and Dora in Knoxville and working as a cook at a hotel.

=== 1920s ===
William A. Johnson never married. The last member of immediate family, his older sister Florence Johnson Smith, died in 1920. Beginning in the 1920s, William A. Johnson became a minor celebrity in East Tennessee. He lived at 325 Douglas Street in Knoxville, and was interviewed a number of times for newspaper articles and radio programs. He was sometimes included in events commemorating Andrew Johnson. For instance, in 1923 he was present for a ceremony in which Andrew Johnson's descendants donated the President's "old tailor shop" building to the state of Tennessee.

William Andrew Johnson, baker for Herbert's Dairy lunch, and the only surviving body servant of President Andrew Johnson has been invited to attend the celebration in Greeneville, Tenn., May 30, when the old tailor shop of the President will be presented to the State of Tennessee by his great-granddaughter Miss Margaret Johnson Patterson. ¶ The old slave appears on the program and will be introduced by Andrew Johnson Patterson, a grandson of the President. He will be expected to make a short talk about the President as he knew him. The negro was valet to the President and was with him at the time of his death. He has several pieces of furniture at his home here which belonged to the president.

Similarly, in 1925 a Nashville paper reported that William A. Johnson was to appear at a Memorial Day celebration at Rutledge, Tennessee, along with former Tennessee governor Alf A. Taylor. After the fact a Knoxville newspaper reported that a Congressman attended, that the old Johnson Tailor Shop building was celebrated, and that "A silver dollar [that] belonged to President Johnson was on exhibition. His slave was introduced to the audience and spoke briefly." A couple of days later the same paper reported, "The stage was decorated with cut flowers, and on a table belonging to Andrew Johnson there was a huge cake, baked by William Andrew Johnson, a slave of President Johnson, the cake being donated by Andrew Johnson Patterson, a grandson of Andrew Johnson." In 1927, Johnson was hired as the cook at the Rutledge Inn in Rutledge, Tennessee, and spoke to a newspaper about his history with Andrew Johnson, about whom he spoke with "tender regard." There was another burst of publicity centered on William A. Johnson in 1929, when was he was hired to be a doorman at Knoxville's Andrew Johnson Hotel. A reporter from the Columbia Record of Columbia, South Carolina visited the hotel and recorded some of Johnson's reminiscences:

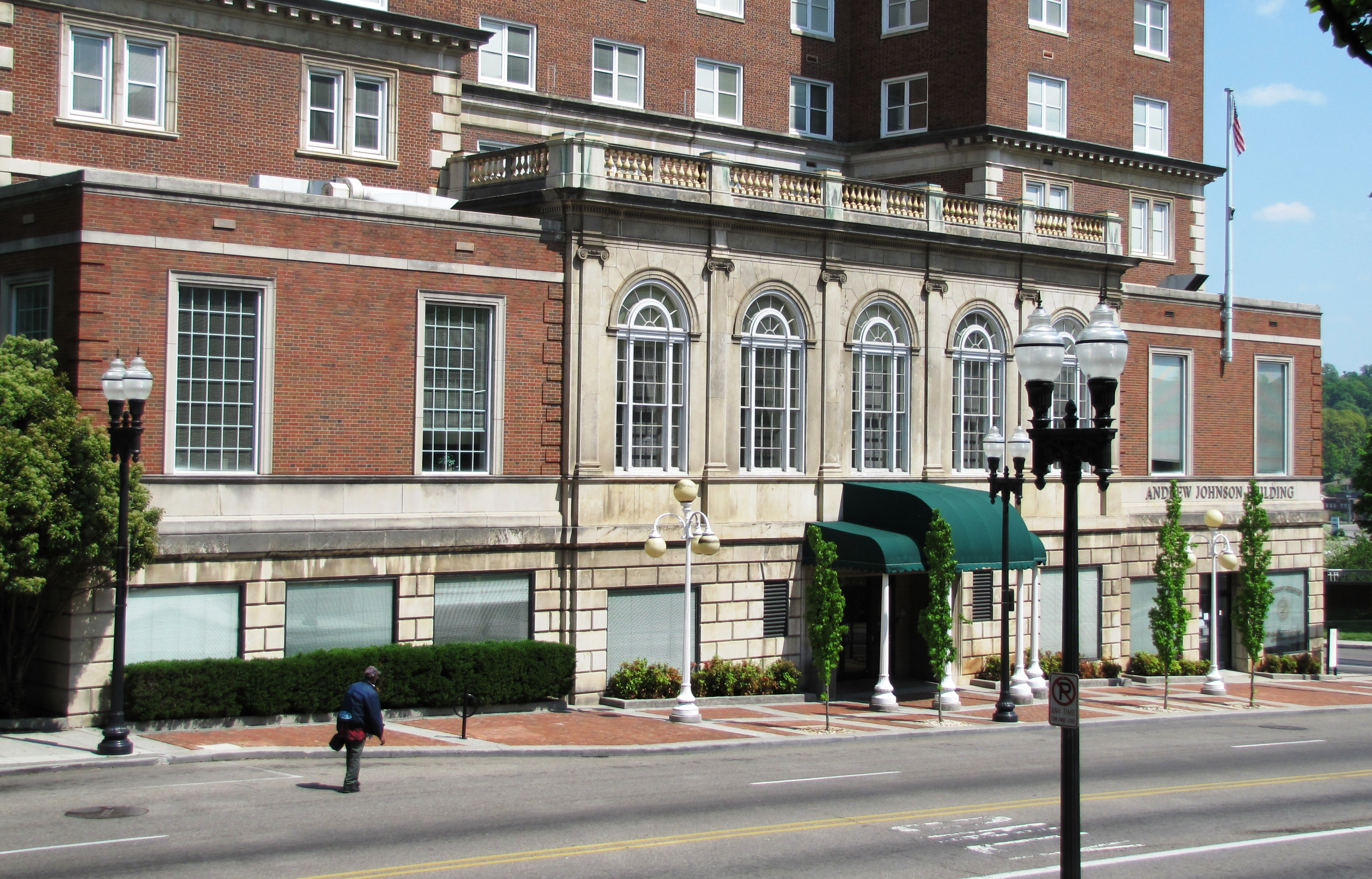
Façade of the former Andrew Johnson Hotel, photographed 2010

[He] would rather tell of "Marse Andrew" than do anything else in the world. His name is William Andrew Johnson, but to hundreds he is known as "Uncle William." ¶ "Anybody would have known Marse Andrew was a tailor in his younger days," he says. "He always did mend his own clothes, even when he was President. He'd sew his buttons on, and press his own clothes." ¶ "Marse Andrew was a real brave man. One time I saw him making a speech in Nashville, and somebody took two shots at him. A lot of 'em chunked rocks. But he went right on talking." ¶ "That man sure enjoyed eating. He liked, best of all, oven baked light bread with butter and syrup made of white sugar. He was crazy about medium broiled steak. And he liked buttermilk, too." ¶ And on for hours will talk "Uncle William" if given a chance.

During another interview that year he recalled that Andrew Johnson once traveled overseas and visited Napoleon's redoubt at St. Helena. The elder Johnson brought back cuttings of willows growing on the island that he planted at the house in Greeneville. Around Christmastime 1929, William A. Johnson solved the "case of the stolen drapes" at the Andrew Johnson Hotel when he noticed a woman leaving with curtain fabric hanging out of the back of her suitcase. The assistant manager chased her down and found she was also carrying towels, a coffee pot, and spoons from other regional hotels.

=== 1930s ===
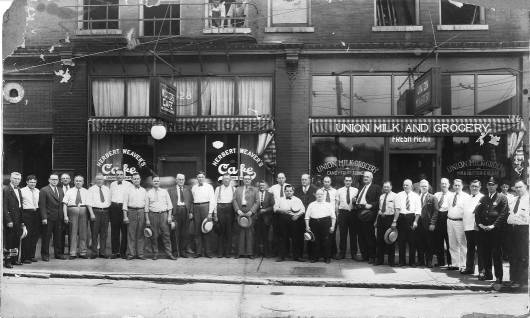
William A. Johnson baked cakes and pies at Herbert Weaver's Café beginning in 1930; photographed here in 1931, the cafe was located on the ground floor of the now-demolished Sprankle Building on Knoxville's Union Avenue. (McClung Historical Collection at Lawson McGhee Library, Knox County Public Library system)

By fall 1930, Johnson had left his job as a doorman and returned to cooking and baking; he prepared 5,000 donuts for the grand opening of a 24-hour coffee shop on Union Avenue, which was run by Herbert Weaver and Harry O'Neil. Johnson worked every day but Sunday from about 5 a.m. to 1 p.m. "or when I get my pies and pastries baked." Herbert Weaver and his wife Frances (Curtis) Weaver were Johnson's friends and often helped him with transportation and advocated for him. Apparently at some point early in the Great Depression, "it looked as if William would have to go the poorhouse" but upon hearing this news, Mrs. Weaver "threw a fit." Per Johnson's telling, she said, "Do you think I'd ever let that old man go to the poorhouse? William needn't worry about the poorhouse as long as I'm here." Johnson also worked at one point for Mr. and Mrs. Frank Weaver (Frank and Herbert being brothers), who owned a separate restaurant on Knoxville's main commercial thoroughfare, Gay Street.

In 1934, Herbert Weaver told the Knoxville News-Sentinel that he hoped local Democratic leaders would cooperate with him in devising a plan to introduce William A. Johnson to Franklin D. Roosevelt. Roosevelt visited East Tennessee on November 17, 1934, to promote the Tennessee Valley Authority projects of his New Deal program, specifically the Norris Dam. However, the 1934 introduction did not occur and the paper published a photo of a forlorn-looking Johnson with a "WELCOME" ribbon pinned to his jacket. Two years later, in 1936, William Andrew Johnson and Johnson's great-granddaughter Margaret Johnson Patterson were guests on a WNOX radio program called Strolling in East Tennessee with Bert Vincent. The program notes for the episode state: "A dramatic sketch presented a slave auction of early days, and later portrayed President Johnson on his deathbed, still accompanied by the faithful William Andrew. The old former slave now works in a Knoxville restaurant."

=== 1937: Ernie Pyle, Franklin Delano Roosevelt, and national radio ===
In 1937, nationally syndicated Scripps Howard newspaper columnist Ernie Pyle visited Knoxville on his "rambling reporter" tour of America. He and local columnist Bert Vincent interviewed each other, and Vincent introduced Pyle to William A. Johnson. The two "sat in the back of a Knoxville restaurant" and had a long conversation about Johnson's work, his family, and his lifelong connection to the Andrew Johnson family. Pyle's interview with Johnson, originally datelined February 3, 1937, has become an oft-cited 20th-century source on the later life of President A. Johnson and on his personal ownership of slaves before the Civil War and Emancipation. They discussed Johnson's childhood memories of the elder Johnson—"Mr. Andrew Johnson would hold me on one knee and my sister on the other, and he'd rub our heads and laugh"—and how William Andrew nursed Andrew Johnson for the final six days of his life, as he suffered from a series of debilitating and ultimately fatal strokes, as well as the younger Johnson's disappointment at not getting to meet Franklin D. Roosevelt on his trip to Norris Dam.

Pyle's column likely caught the attention of White House Press Secretary Stephen Early, who thought it might be a human-interest story that could generate positive publicity for Roosevelt. Early arranged for William Andrew Johnson to travel to Washington, D.C., to visit Roosevelt at the White House, and then "leaked" the meeting to the press. An U.S. Secret Service man (alternately described as a "G-man from Louisville, Kentucky") was sent to chaperone him and the two traveled by train to D.C. "You know, my folks used to live here," Johnson told a Knoxville reporter tagging along. Roosevelt conversed with Johnson for half an hour in the Oval Office and/or the Red Room. Per Johnson, "He wanted to know all about my white folks—that was President Johnson and his family. I brought him all the pictures I had of Mr. Johnson, and his granddaughter Mrs. Margaret Patterson, and my sister, who was a slave in his family, too." At the end of the meeting, Roosevelt presented Johnson with a silver-handled cane engraved with both their names. Johnson was then taken on a Secret Service-chaperoned tour of the U.S. Capitol, where he was introduced to Vice President John Nance Garner, the Washington Monument, the Lincoln Memorial, Arlington National Cemetery (including the Tomb of the Unknown Soldier), and Mount Vernon. He may have also been interviewed for the radio. Johnson called the visit with FDR and the trip generally "the finest thing that's ever happened." Later in the year Johnson told a reporter, "When I called on Mr. Roosevelt in Washington I hadn't been to the White House in 62 years. I told Mr. Roosevelt that his makeup was more like President Johnson's than any man I had ever seen. They were both grand men, and they both talked so nice and grand to me." Pyle said his role in prompting the meeting was the "happiest I've ever inadvertently made anybody."

Johnson wrote thank you notes to Roosevelt and Pyle after the meeting. Bert Vincent reported that Johnson hoped the visit prestaged better relations between "white folks and colored folks" in the American South. The week after Johnson's visit to D.C., Mrs. Herbert Weaver drove Johnson to Greeneville to visit Mrs. Andrew J. Patterson, Andrew Johnson's granddaughter-in-law and the wife of his childhood companion, and her daughter Mattie Patterson. The visit made the front page of the Greeneville Sun newspaper. In March, Johnson allowed his Roosevelt cane to be used as a prop in a school play.

In early December 1937, U.S. Senator George L. Berry submitted legislation to provide Johnson with a US$30 (equivalent to $671.87 in 2025) a month federal pension. Berry's legislation likely did not pass as six years later U.S. Senator Kenneth McKellar requested the same, at which time Johnson was said to be in the "alms house."

Johnson was invited to be a guest on Gabriel Heatter's We the People radio show on the CBS network between Christmas and New Year's. Producers paid travel expenses for Johnson and a companion (termed a "guardian" by the newspaper), as well as a US$5 (equivalent to about $110 in 2025) per diem for both. Johnson was accompanied to New York by Mrs. Herbert Weaver; Johnson was still working as a pastry chef at Weaver's Grill on Union Avenue. The trip was said be Johnson's second out-of-state travel since the American Reconstruction era, the first being his trip to D.C. to visit with Roosevelt. While in New York, Johnson visited the headquarters of the NAACP and was interviewed by the United Press. He said that despite his age, "I feel good because I never lived a rowdy life. I've smoked in late years and I take a toddy now and then, but I don't overdo either." Johnson's guest stint on the We the People radio program could be heard in Knoxville via "WBT 1080 kilocycles or WHAS 810 kilocycles," broadcasters out of Charlotte, North Carolina, and Louisville, Kentucky, respectively. At the time the December 30, 1937 episode aired from 6:30 to 7 p.m. on the Columbia Broadcasting System radio network, William Andrew Johnson was the only Knoxvillian who had ever been interviewed on We the People.

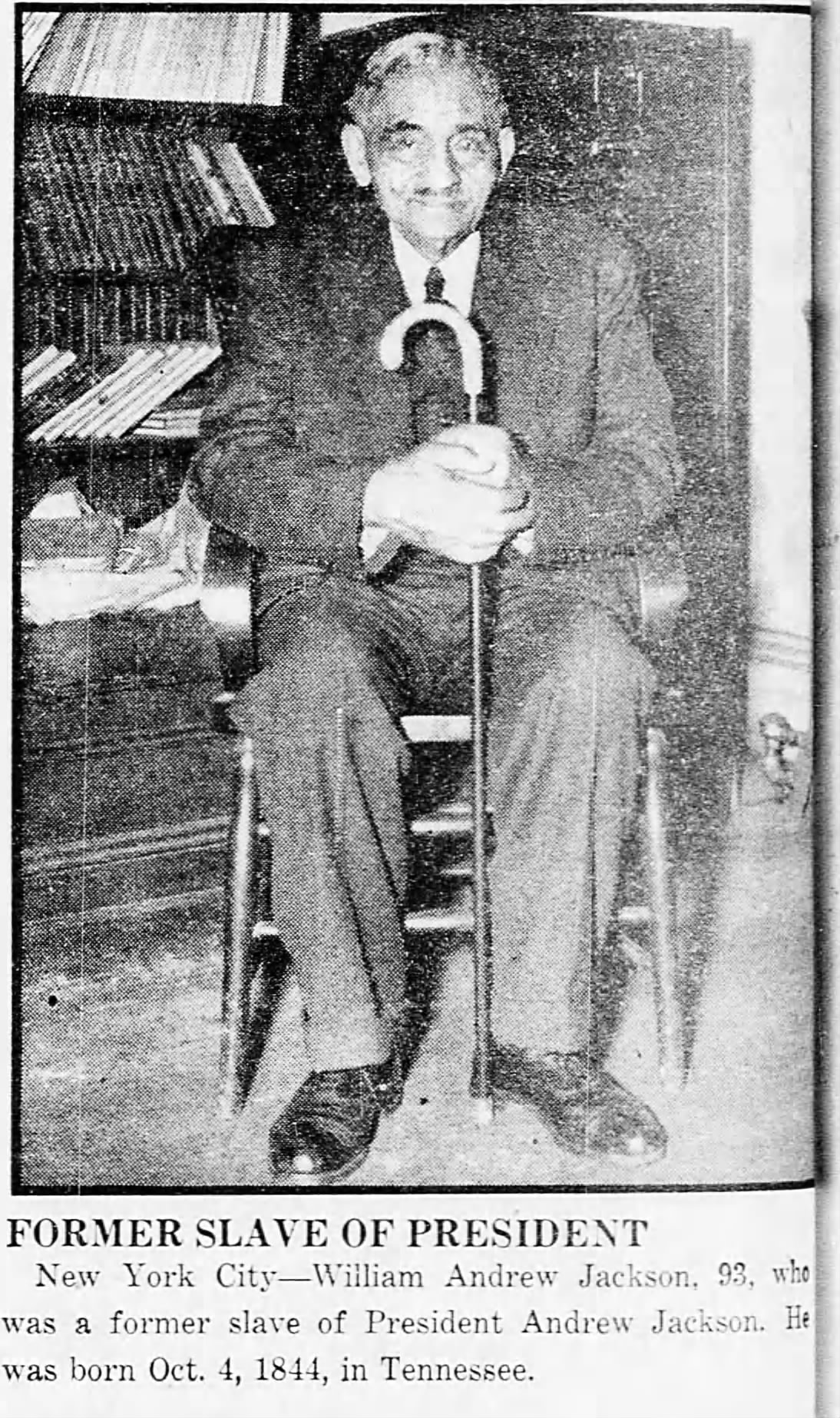
This miscaptioned photo, which appeared in several Scripps-Howard papers, prompted Johnson to call in a correction via Bert Vincent; "It should be Andrew Johnson instead of Andrew Jackson. ...'And I'm not 93 either,' William says. 'I'm just about 78 years old.'"

=== Later years ===
The following year, 1938, Johnson spoke at a Tennessee Emancipation Day celebration at Chilhowee Park.

Johnson is one of the last surviving slaves in this section. January 1 was designated as Emancipation day but Andrew Johnson freed his slaves August 8 and Negroes of East Tennessee have always observed that date as Emancipation day. The celebration this year has been changed to August 9 because August 8 is on Sunday.

In 1941, Bert Vincent used his "Strolling" column in the Knoxville News-Sentinel as a platform to request a wheelchair for the aging and ailing Johnson; Johnson suffered leg pain and could no longer walk. The Knoxville Red Cross came through.

William A. Johnson, age 85, died at 2 p.m. on May 16, 1943, at the George Maloney Home, a facility for the indigent aged in Knoxville, Tennessee. According to the home superintendent, Johnson had been ailing for quite a while before he died. After his death, Margaret Johnson Patterson, a great-granddaughter of Andrew Johnson, told the Knoxville Journal a bit about the family's view of Johnson:

I have often heard my father say that William had a black skin but there never was a whiter person on the inside. He was 17 years old when the President died but the President, too, had learned to like him a whole lot and often said that he was one of the most devoted boys he had ever seen. The members of my family heard of his illness and made a trip to Knoxville to see him last Tuesday...He was quite weak at the time of our visit but he talked to us for over an hour.

— Margaret Johnson Patterson, Knoxville Journal, May 17, 1943

== FDR cane and scrapbook ==
In 2011, local historians examining Tennessee's unique Emancipation Day traditions began researching the topic of Andrew Johnson and slavery. Researcher Randi Nott encountered Andrew Johnson Presidential Museum and Library at Tusculum College archivist Kathy Cuff at a conference, and after discussing the life history of William A. Johnson, Cuff found that William A. Johnson's scrapbook was hidden away, uninventoried, in their collection. Meanwhile, amateur Knoxville historian Bill Murrah worked on the family tree of Sam Johnson. Sam Johnson was William A. Johnson's uncle, and is often credited with initiating the August 8 celebration of Emancipation in Tennessee. Murrah eventually connected by telephone with a man in Louisville, Kentucky, named Ned Arter, who was one of Sam Johnson's great-great-grandsons. Arter had no idea of his family's connection to U.S. President Andrew Johnson. He did, however, have a mysterious artefact stored away in his closet: a silver-handled cane engraved with the names Franklin D. Roosevelt and William A. Johnson. Arter was a featured speaker at the Andrew Johnson National Historic Site commemoration of Tennessee's Emancipation Day on August 8, 2012. Arter brought the cane with him to the presentation. Circa 2011 there were plans to publish William Andrew Johnson's scrapbook online via the Digital Library of Appalachia.

== See also ==
- "I, Too" (1927 poem by Langston Hughes)
- Reparations for slavery in the United States
- List of last survivors of American slavery
- Presidency of Franklin D. Roosevelt, first and second terms
- List of presidents of the United States who owned slaves
- List of vice presidents of the United States who owned slaves
- List of children of presidents of the United States
- African Americans in Tennessee § History
- Bibliography of Andrew Johnson
