= Helen Claire =

American actress

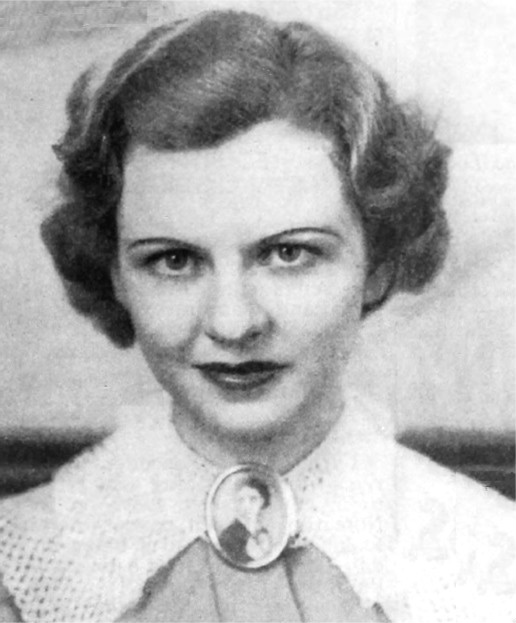
- Claire in 1938
- Born: October 18, 1905; Union Springs, Alabama
- Died: January 12, 1974 (aged 62); Birmingham, Alabama, U.S.
- Education: Randolph-Macon Woman's College
- Occupation: Actress
- Known for: Joyce Jordan, M.D.
- Spouse: Dr. Milton Smith (1942 - ?)

Helen Claire (October 18, 1911 – January 12, 1974) was an actress on Broadway and in old-time radio.

== Early years ==
Helen Claire was born in Union Springs, Alabama, to Col. and Mrs. Henry J. Rosenstihl. She grew up in Alabama and graduated cum laude from Randolph-Macon Woman's College, where she was a member of Phi Beta Kappa Society. She ventured to New York City and enrolled at Columbia University, from which she obtained a master's degree in psychology. Following graduation from Columbia, she attended Feagin School of Dramatic Art.

== Radio ==
Claire's roles in radio programs included those shown in the table below.

Program	Character
Backstage Wife	Virginia Lansing
Bright Horizon	Edith Browning
Death Valley Days	Jan Thackery
Dr. Christian	Judy
Joyce Jordan, M.D.	Joyce Jordan
The O'Neills	Sally Scott O'Neill
Roses and Drums	Betty Graham
Stella Dallas	Ada Dexter
The Story of Bess Johnson	Mrs. Jordan

Other programs in which Claire was a member of the cast included Young Widder Brown, Of Great Riches Stories of the Black Chamber, Aunt Jenny's Real Life Stories, Hilltop House, Stella Dallas, and Evelyn Winters.

Claire also had a recurring role on Dr. Christian, which annually broadcast several episodes from New York City rather than from its usual Hollywood site. During those times, Claire played nurse Judy Price, replacing Rosemary DeCamp, who portrayed Price in the broadcasts from Hollywood.

Claire also appeared on the radio version of Texaco Star Theatre and on "the Two Stars program over the WJZ network."

== Stage ==
Although Claire had been advised seven years earlier "to abandon any idea she might have of becoming an actress" because of her southern accent, a 1938 newspaper article acclaimed Claire as "the first 'discovery' of the new Broadway season" for her work in Kiss the Boys Goodbye. Paul Ross wrote, "When the critical salvos had died down, it was found ... that the unknown from Alabama had risen to stardom over night." In February 1939, another newspaper article reported: "Helen Claire, a few months ago a comparative unknown, is now the toast of Broadway. Hard-boiled New York has so fallen for this real life Cindy Lou [Claire's character in Kiss the Boys Goodbye] that her mornings are filled with interviews, her afternoons with screen tests, guest appearances, dinner parties." Matinee performances of the play sometimes occurred on days when she had radio obligations. In those instances she wore her first-act costume to the studio, and a taxi waited to take her to the theater as soon as she finished her work on the air.

Claire's Broadway debut came in 1932 in Girls in Uniform. She also appeared in Sunny River and Jezebel.

== Film ==
Claire's voice was familiar to moviegoers who were attentive to Movietone News segments that preceded feature films in theaters. Twice a week she provided narration of fashion news segments for those newsreels.

== Television ==
Claire and others from the cast of The Parker Family radio program made an "experimental" broadcast of a TV version of the show on NBC May 9, 1941.

In 1953, Claire, as narrator, received a certificate of merit related to the Sylvania Award "for outstanding individual variety performance on the Ford show" that was won by Mary Martin.

== Personal life ==
Claire married Dr. Milton Smith May 22, 1941, in White Plains, New York. He was head of the drama department at Columbia University. They met when she was a student at Columbia and took a drama class to diminish her Southern drawl.

== Death ==
Claire died January 12, 1974, aged 62, in Birmingham, Alabama.
