= Lucy Feagin =

American teacher and dramatist

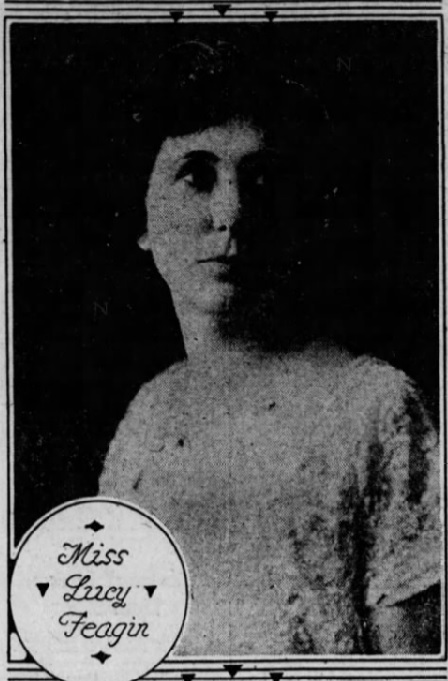
- Lucy Feagin, pictured in The Birmingham News
- Born: January 13, 1876; Union Springs, Alabama, US
- Died: May 8, 1963 (aged 87); Birmingham, Alabama, US
- Occupation(s): Arts and dramatics instructor
- Known for: Feagin School of Dramatic Art

Lucy Harris Feagin (January 13, 1876 – May 8, 1963) was an American teacher and founder of the Feagin School of Dramatic Art in New York City. She was the first woman to establish and operate a drama school in New York City where she taught students who later became prominent actors and actresses. Her students came from around the world. The New York League of Business and Professional Women in June 1938 named Feagin "as one of the twenty-five most outstanding career women of America".

== Personal life ==
Lisa Feagin was born in Union Springs, Alabama, on January 13, 1876, to Isaac Ball Feagin and Sarah Hall Feagin. Her father was a lieutenant colonel in the 15th Regiment Alabama Infantry and was wounded at the Battle of Sharpsburg in 1862. 10 months later, he was wounded again, leading to his losing his leg at the Battle of Gettysburg. Feagin's mother resided in Bullock County, Alabama, for 60 years and lived to be almost 100. As a child, Feagin, her siblings and other childhood friends play-acted, using a piano box for a stage. She studied at Hollins College in Virginia where she needed to supplement her art courses, then considered "normal" for a woman, with the study of drama. She lived in Washington, D.C., for eight years before moving to New York City. Feagin continued to visit her mother in Union Springs annually.

== Teaching career ==
Upon graduating, Feagin was a drama instructor for ten years at Judson College in Marion, Alabama, and George Washington University in Washington, D.C. Feagin worked with well-known drama teachers to enhance her own drama knowledge and skills, while she continued teaching. She studied in London and Paris. She taught at the Allen School in Birmingham, Alabama. She founded her first studio, the Feagin School of Drama and Radio in Carnegie Hall in 1915. One of her teaching techniques was to tell stories like Don Quixote and the Adventures of Huckleberry Finn to her classes of students, artists, and businessmen. At the same time, Feagin presented weekly lectures on the dramatic arts at the Plaza Hotel beginning in October 1921. She lectured adults who wanted to act, sing, or simply to develop their diction. Additionally, Feagin was a part of New York's lecture corps in the bureau of education lecturing to parents and other adults. She also presented lectures in Philadelphia, New England, and cities near New York. Feagin operated her school until the beginning of World War I when she closed her studio to concentrate on aiding the war effort. During the war, Feagin worked on plays and other forms of entertainment at camps alongside thousands of other women. She was part of a patriotic pageant for President Woodrow Wilson on July 4, 1917, which she said was "the greatest thrill she had ever known".

After the war, she reopened her studio at Carnegie Hall before relocating it to 316 West 57th Street in New York City. Later she relocated to a larger studio to accommodate her growing number of students. Her new studio, in the International Building at Rockefeller Center in New York City, could hold around 300 students and 18 staff. The studio contained a 250-seat Little Theater, a large stage, a broadcast studio, classrooms, and studios for scenery and costume design. Her students' backgrounds were international. Broadway theatre producers frequently sent talent scouts to watch Feagin's students. Recruiters for the radio, screen, and stage were always on hand when the seniors presented their plays. Her studio "teas" were frequented by the Broadway and radio stars of the era – including Ina Claire, Elizabeth Patterson, and Helen Hayes.

== Accomplishments and legacy ==
Feagin was the first woman to found and operate a drama school in New York City. Lily May Caldwell of The Birmingham News wrote, "The lady helped make the team, "Alabama and Broadway", as much an American institution as grits and gravy and ham and eggs and turkey and cranberries". Feagin was offered the opportunity to be part of a program at Central Park to celebrate William Shakespeare's 368th birthday which The Birmingham News said was a "significant honor". Her lectures titled "The Charm of Good Speech" received praise.

The New York League of Business and Professional Women in June 1938 named Feagin "as one of the twenty-five most outstanding career women of America". The New York Evening Telegram wrote that "Miss Lucy Feagin might be called a specialist in the high art of self-expression". Her students included Jeff Corey, Susan Hayward, Angela Lansbury, and Cris Alexander. The Troy Messenger said, "The League found a number of studios originated by women, it is true; but Lucy Feagin's organization differed from them in completeness of curriculum, size of faculty and enrollment and character of equipment."

== Death ==
Feagin taught private lessons until around two years before her death on May 8, 1963, in Birmingham, Alabama. Services took place at Oakhill Cemetery.
