= John Warren Branscomb =

John Warren Branscomb (1905-1959) was an American bishop of the Methodist Church, elected in 1952.

He was born 11 May 1905 in Union Springs, Alabama. He attended Emory University and was a clergy member of the Florida Annual Conference. He was elected to the episcopacy by the Southeastern Jurisdictional Conference of the Methodist Church. He was assigned to the Jacksonville episcopal area, which included Cuba and the Florida Conference.

He died of a heart attack on 16 January 1959 in Orlando, Florida at Orange Memorial Hospital now known as Orlando Regional Medical Center, the Funeral service was held in Orlando, Fl and he was buried in his hometown of Union Springs, Alabama.

Branscomb Memorial Auditorium is located on the Frank Lloyd Wright campus of Florida Southern College in Lakeland, Florida. Architect Nils Schweitzer, a protégé of Frank Lloyd Wright, designed the structure to complement Wright’s original “Child of the Sun” concept. Construction was completed in 1963. Dedicated to Bishop John Branscomb of the Florida Conference of the United Methodist Church, the auditorium hosted its first performance in 1964. Since that time, the Branscomb Memorial Auditorium stage has presented artists and performing groups from six continents through the college’s annual Festival of Fine Arts series. Not only is Branscomb Memorial Auditorium a historic structure, it is acoustically one of the very best concert halls in the United States. With a natural audio reverberation time of approximately 1.3 seconds, it has been compared by many artists to Carnegie Hall.

== See also ==
- List of bishops of the United Methodist Church
