= Edith Burroughs =

American ten-pin bowler

Edith Burroughs (born 1939) was a pro-bowler who was born in Union Springs, Alabama. She is the seventh child of fourteen born in her family. In 1979, she became the first black person to win a pro bowling tournament in the United States.
