= Mary Hardway Walker =

One of the last surviving American former enslaved persons

- Born: 1848; Union Springs, Alabama
- Died: 1969 (Aged 121?); Chattanooga, Tennessee

Mary Hardway Walker (c. 1848–1969) was purportedly one of the last surviving American former slaves when she died in 1969 and received acclaim as allegedly America's oldest student.

Walker was purportedly born in Union Springs, Alabama in 1848. She was freed from slavery when she was 15 in 1863. She married and had her first child by age 20. In 1917, she moved with her family to Chattanooga, Tennessee where she cooked, cleaned, provided childcare, and sold sandwiches to support her local church.

She enrolled in a literacy class in 1963, learning to read at the age of 116, and was awarded various awards including U.S. Department of Health, Education, and Welfare certification as America's oldest student. She was appointed as Chattanooga's Ambassador of Goodwill and received accolades from various Federal and local dignitaries. She died reportedly aged 121 in 1969. When she died, her retirement home was renamed after her.

A children's book about Walker's educational journey entitled The Oldest Student: How Mary Walker Learned to Read was published in 2020.

== See also ==
- List of last survivors of American slavery
