= Peter Mills (freedman) =

Last surviving freedman in the US

- Born: October 26, 1861; Prince George's County, Maryland, US
- Died: September 22, 1972 (aged 110); Pittsburgh, Pennsylvania, US
- Spouse: 5 wives

Peter Mills (October 26, 1861? – September 22, 1972) was possibly the last known surviving American man born into legal slavery: he died in 1972 at the purported age of 110.

Per Mills, he was born in Prince George's County, Maryland on October 26, 1861. After the Civil War, he worked on his father's farm every day during the week before leaving to work in Baltimore and Washington, DC where he dug sewers, was a bricklayer and plasterer and played baseball in his spare time. Mills eventually moved to Pittsburgh after first visiting in 1881. Mills was injured on 1 August 1972 when he was hit by a vehicle while a pedestrian. He died in hospital, where he was being treated for the injuries, on September 22, 1972. He outlived his five wives.

== See also ==
- List of last survivors of American slavery
