= Union Springs, Alabama =

City in Alabama, United States

Union Springs
- City
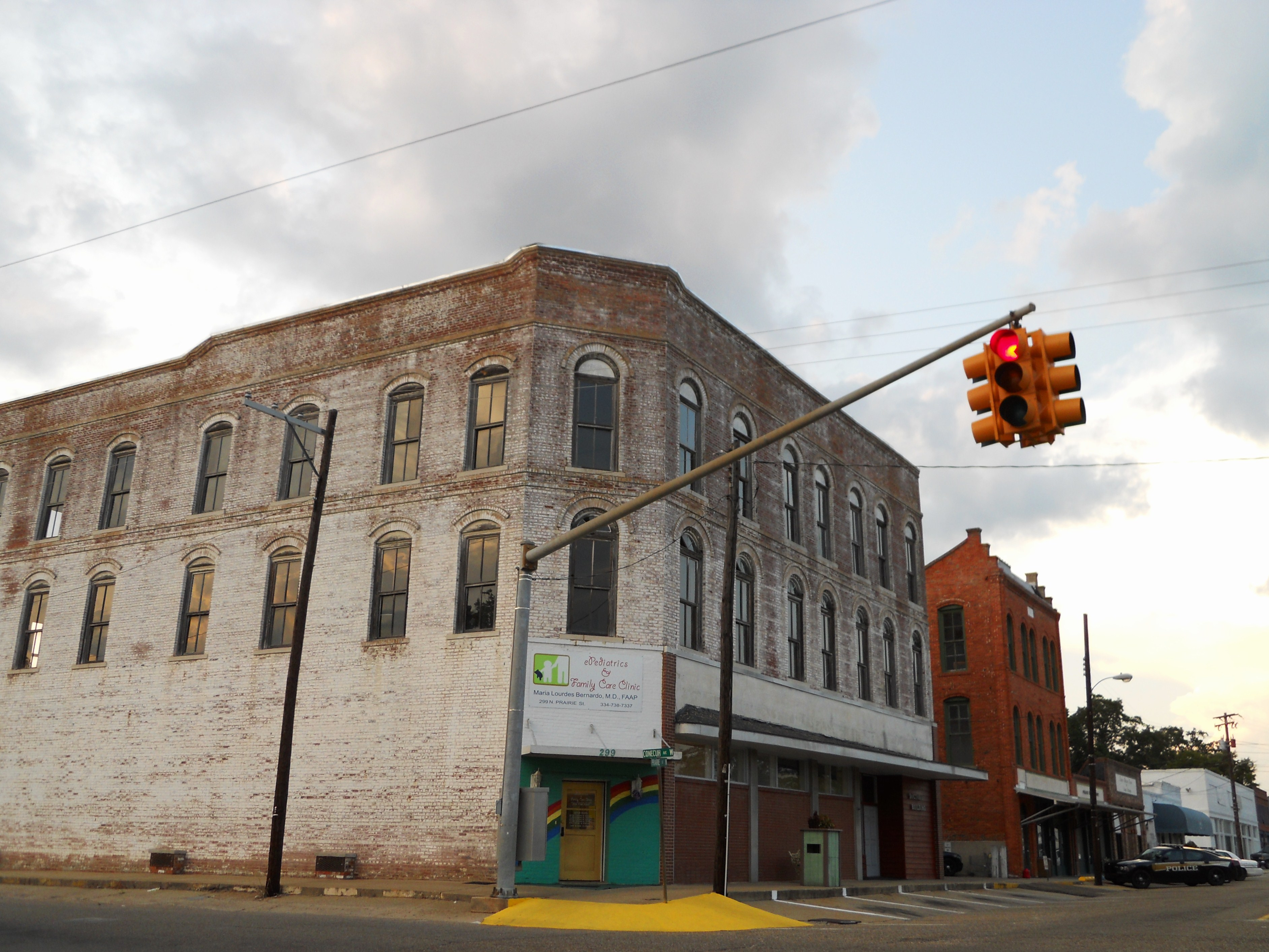
- Union Springs at sundown

- Flag
- Nicknames: Bird Dog Field Trial Capital of the World; The Serendipity Center of the South
- Location of Union Springs in Bullock County, Alabama.
- Coordinates: 32°07′45″N 85°42′51″W
- Country: United States
- State: Alabama
- County: Bullock
- Settled: 1835
- Incorporated: 1844

Government
  - Type: Mayor/Council

Area
  - Total: 6.69 sq mi (17.33 km^{2})
  - Land: 6.63 sq mi (17.17 km^{2})
  - Water: 0.058 sq mi (0.15 km^{2})
- Elevation: 489 ft (149 m)

Population (2020)
  - Total: 3,358
  - Density: 506.5/sq mi (195.56/km^{2})
- Time zone: UTC-6 (Central (CST))
  - Summer (DST): UTC-5 (CDT)
- ZIP code: 36089
- Area code: 334
- FIPS code: 01-77880
- GNIS feature ID: 2405629
- Website: https://cityofunionspringsal.com/

Union Springs is a city in and the county seat of Bullock County, Alabama, United States. As of the 2020 census, Union Springs had a population of 3,358.

== History ==
The area that became Union Springs was first settled by white men after the Creek Indian removal of the 1830s. Twenty-seven springs watered the land, giving rise to the name of Union Springs. The city was incorporated on January 13, 1844. Voters selected Union Springs as the county seat when Bullock County was formed in 1866.

== Geography ==
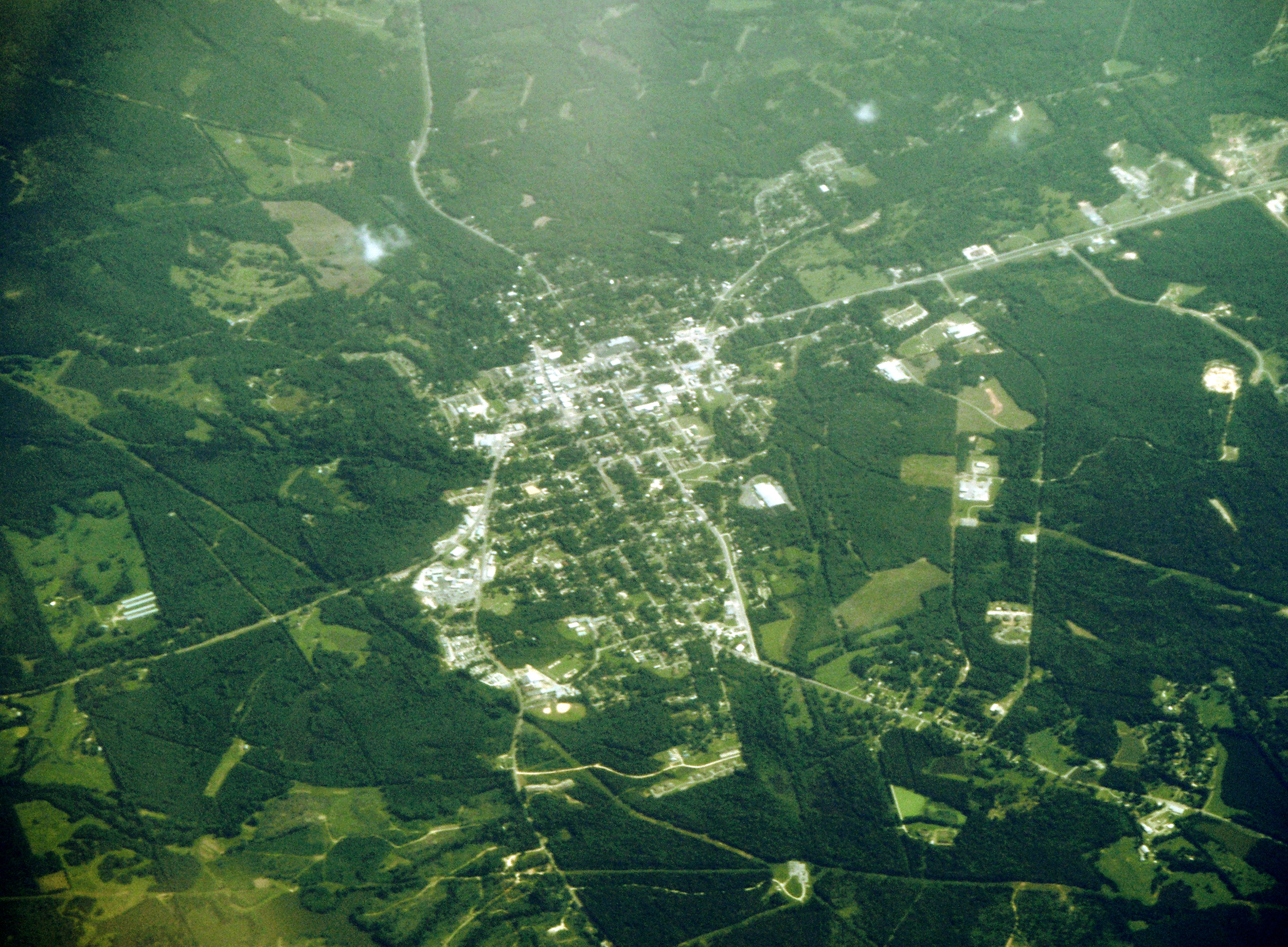
Aerial view of Union Springs

Union Springs is located in southeastern Alabama near the center of Bullock County. The source of the Conecuh River is within the city limits.

The city is located at the intersection of U.S. Route 82 and U.S. Route 29. Route 82 leads east 40 miles (64 km) to Eufaula and northwest 46 miles (74 km) to Montgomery, the state capital. Route 29 leads north 23 miles (37 km) to Tuskegee and southwest 40 miles (64 km) to Troy.

According to the U.S. Census Bureau, Union Springs has a total area of 6.7 square miles (17.3 km^{2}), of which 6.6 square miles (17.2 km^{2}) is land and 0.077 square miles (0.2 km^{2}), or 0.93%, is water.

=== Climate ===
The climate in this area is characterized by hot, humid summers and generally mild to cool winters. According to the Köppen Climate Classification system, Union Springs has a humid subtropical climate, abbreviated "Cfa" on climate maps.

Climate data for Union Springs, Alabama, 1991–2020 normals, extremes 1892–2016
Month	Jan	Feb	Mar	Apr	May	Jun	Jul	Aug	Sep	Oct	Nov	Dec	Year
Record high °F (°C)	82 (28)	84 (29)	92 (33)	96 (36)	102 (39)	106 (41)	107 (42)	104 (40)	106 (41)	98 (37)	89 (32)	83 (28)	107 (42)
Mean maximum °F (°C)	74.1 (23.4)	77.2 (25.1)	83.1 (28.4)	86.3 (30.2)	90.3 (32.4)	94.7 (34.8)	96.0 (35.6)	96.0 (35.6)	92.6 (33.7)	87.6 (30.9)	81.3 (27.4)	76.4 (24.7)	97.6 (36.4)
Mean daily maximum °F (°C)	58.0 (14.4)	61.9 (16.6)	69.2 (20.7)	75.3 (24.1)	81.9 (27.7)	87.1 (30.6)	89.4 (31.9)	88.5 (31.4)	85.1 (29.5)	76.7 (24.8)	67.2 (19.6)	59.7 (15.4)	75.0 (23.9)
Daily mean °F (°C)	46.3 (7.9)	49.7 (9.8)	56.1 (13.4)	62.0 (16.7)	69.9 (21.1)	76.7 (24.8)	79.7 (26.5)	78.9 (26.1)	74.6 (23.7)	64.2 (17.9)	53.8 (12.1)	48.4 (9.1)	63.4 (17.4)
Mean daily minimum °F (°C)	34.5 (1.4)	37.5 (3.1)	43.0 (6.1)	48.8 (9.3)	57.9 (14.4)	66.3 (19.1)	70.0 (21.1)	69.3 (20.7)	64.1 (17.8)	51.8 (11.0)	40.5 (4.7)	37.0 (2.8)	51.7 (11.0)
Mean minimum °F (°C)	17.3 (−8.2)	20.9 (−6.2)	26.6 (−3.0)	33.3 (0.7)	44.9 (7.2)	56.3 (13.5)	63.6 (17.6)	62.0 (16.7)	49.6 (9.8)	34.7 (1.5)	26.5 (−3.1)	19.4 (−7.0)	13.5 (−10.3)
Record low °F (°C)	−2 (−19)	−7 (−22)	14 (−10)	28 (−2)	36 (2)	44 (7)	55 (13)	51 (11)	39 (4)	26 (−3)	15 (−9)	3 (−16)	−7 (−22)
Average precipitation inches (mm)	5.02 (128)	4.72 (120)	5.47 (139)	4.57 (116)	4.34 (110)	4.91 (125)	5.90 (150)	5.00 (127)	3.79 (96)	3.41 (87)	4.83 (123)	5.23 (133)	57.19 (1,454)
Average snowfall inches (cm)	0.0 (0.0)	0.2 (0.51)	0.2 (0.51)	0.0 (0.0)	0.0 (0.0)	0.0 (0.0)	0.0 (0.0)	0.0 (0.0)	0.0 (0.0)	0.0 (0.0)	0.0 (0.0)	0.2 (0.51)	0.6 (1.53)
Average precipitation days (≥ 0.01 in)	8.5	7.8	7.5	6.7	5.9	8.7	9.9	8.9	5.8	4.6	6.0	7.6	87.9
Average snowy days (≥ 0.1 in)	0.0	0.1	0.1	0.0	0.0	0.0	0.0	0.0	0.0	0.0	0.0	0.2	0.4
Source 1: NOAA
Source 2: XMACIS2 (mean maxima/minima 1981–2010)

== Demographics ==
Historical population
Census	Pop.	Note	%±
1870	1,455		—
1880	1,862		28.0%
1890	2,049		10.0%
1900	2,634		28.6%
1910	4,055		53.9%
1920	4,125		1.7%
1930	2,875		−30.3%
1940	3,107		8.1%
1950	3,232		4.0%
1960	3,704		14.6%
1970	4,324		16.7%
1980	4,431		2.5%
1990	3,975		−10.3%
2000	3,670		−7.7%
2010	3,980		8.4%
2020	3,358		−15.6%
U.S. Decennial Census

=== 2020 census ===
As of the 2020 census, Union Springs had a population of 3,358. The median age was 35.1 years. 28.1% of residents were under the age of 18 and 15.9% of residents were 65 years of age or older. For every 100 females there were 79.0 males, and for every 100 females age 18 and over there were 73.4 males age 18 and over.

0.0% of residents lived in urban areas, while 100.0% lived in rural areas.

There were 1,486 households in Union Springs, of which 34.7% had children under the age of 18 living in them. Of all households, 20.7% were married-couple households, 21.5% were households with a male householder and no spouse or partner present, and 53.2% were households with a female householder and no spouse or partner present. About 39.5% of all households were made up of individuals and 15.9% had someone living alone who was 65 years of age or older. There were 856 families.

There were 1,719 housing units, of which 13.6% were vacant. The homeowner vacancy rate was 1.4% and the rental vacancy rate was 5.1%.

Racial composition as of the 2020 census
Race	Number	Percent
White	357	10.6%
Black or African American	2,550	75.9%
American Indian and Alaska Native	57	1.7%
Asian	5	0.1%
Native Hawaiian and Other Pacific Islander	4	0.1%
Some other race	229	6.8%
Two or more races	156	4.6%
Hispanic or Latino (of any race)	412	12.3%

=== 2010 census ===
As of the census of 2010, there were 3,980 people, 1,461 households, and 915 families residing in the city.The population density was 601 inhabitants per square mile (232/km^{2}). There were 1,664 housing units at an average density of 248.4 per square mile (95.9/km^{2}). The racial makeup of the city was 71.8% Black or African American, 12.9% White, 0.2% Native American, 0.4% Asian, 1.1% Pacific Islander, 12.8% from other races, and .8% from two or more races. Hispanic or Latino of any race were 17.0% of the population.

There were 1,461 households, out of which 32.1% had children under the age of 18 living with them, 24.4% were married couples living together, 32.5% had a female householder with no husband present, and 37.4% were non-families. 33.1% of all households were made up of individuals, and 11.5% had someone living alone who was 65 years of age or older. The average household size was 2.59 and the average family size was 3.27.

In the city, the age distribution of the population shows 29.5% under the age of 18, 10.5% from 18 to 24, 23.6% from 25 to 44, 22.6% from 45 to 64, and 13.7% who were 65 years of age or older. The median age was 30.5 years. For every 100 females, there were 85.9 males. For every 100 females age 18 and over, there were 84.7 males.

The median income for a household in the city was $22,476, and the median income for a family was $26,167. Males had a median income of $37,689 versus $21,372 for females. The per capita income for the city was $20,485. About 39.0% of families and 44.4% of the population were below the poverty line, including 73.9% of those under age 18 and 19.4% of those age 65 or over.

== Government and politics ==
From 1845 to 1872, the leader of the town was the intendant. A new charter, which created a six-member council and mayor, for the town was approved on March 1, 1870. Henry Clay Tompkins was elected as the town's first mayor in January 1872. William Owen Baldwin was elected mayor in 1881, but died in 1883. James Blackmon Powell was appointed by the governor to fill the vacancy and served until 1885.

Mayors of Union Springs:

#	Party	Mayor	Term start	Term end	Note	Reference
1		William Hill Waugh	1845	1848	First intendant	
2		Micajah Norfleet Eley	1848	1850		
3		John B. Coleman	1850	1851		
4		Francis A. Rutherford	1851	1852		
5		Thomas Hill Mabson	1852	1853		
6		James W. Hunter	1853	1854		
7		William H. Todd	1854	1855		
8		Henry H. Smith	1855	1856		
9		Thomas H. Ellis	1856	1858		
10		Richard Holmes Powell	1858	1867		
11		Thomas Pullman	1867	1870		
12		Isiah A. Wilson	1848	1850	Last intendant	
13		Henry Clay Tompkins	1872	1874	First mayor	
14		Isiah A. Wilson	1874	1875		
15		Noah B. Feagin	1875	1876		
16		Robert G. Wright	1876	1877		
17		Fleming Law	1877	1879		
18		Shep W. King	1879	1881		
19		William Owen Baldwin	1881	October 1883	Died in office	
20		James Blackmon Powell	November 1883	1885	Appointed by governor	
21		James Bennett Hunter	1885	1886	Son of James Hunter	
22		James A. Paulk	1886	1887		
23		James Dean Norman	1887	1890		
24		David Shaw Bethune	1890	1894		
25		Donald Frederick Sessions	1894	1898		
26		Alonzo D. Fielder	1898	1900		
27		Alexander Edward Singleton Jr.	1900	1902		
28		Bennett Tilman Eley	1902	1904		
29		R.E.L. Cope	1904	1906		
30		L.M. Mosely	1906	1910		
31		J.D. Norman	1910	1912		
32		W.C. Thompson	1912	1916		
33		C.B. Feagin	1916	1920		
34		G.M. Edwards	1920	1926		
35		R.C. Keller	1926	1932		
36		Chester A. May	1932	1940		
37		R.W. Lawrence	1940	1944		
38		James William Chappell Jr.	1948	1951		
39		K.M. Varner	1951	1952		
40		D.G. Gwin	1952	1960		
41		Frank Hunter Anderson	1960	1976		
42		Sam Rainer	1976	1980		
43		Tony Gibson	1980	1984		
44		John G. McGowan	1984	1988		
45		Wayne Chancey	1988	1992		
46		William Durden Dean	1992	?		

== Education ==
Union Springs is served by the Bullock County School District. There are two high schools in the city: Bullock County High School and Bullock County Career Technical Center. There is one middle school, South Highlands Middle School, and one elementary school, Union Springs Elementary.

Conecuh Springs Christian School is a private school for grades K through 12.

== Media ==
=== Newspaper ===
- Union Springs Herald

=== Radio ===
- WQSI 93.9 FM (Modern Rock)

== Infrastructure ==
The United States Postal Service operates the Union Springs Post Office. The Alabama Department of Corrections operates the Bullock Correctional Facility in an Unincorporated community in Bullock County, east of Union Springs.

== Economy ==
A cotton growing region, the arrival of the railroad spurred new economic growth after the Civil War. By the early 1900s, many of the old cotton plantations had become hunting preserves, attracting tourists. The city remains the economic hub of the surrounding agricultural counties.

A major employer in the city is Bonnie Plants, Inc., a plant wholesaler founded in 1918 with revenue exceeding over $250 million by 2020.

== Recreation and culture ==
Union Springs hosts annual field trials for hunting dogs. These trials take place between October and March and attract participants from around the country.

== Notable people ==
- Elizabeth B. Andrews, former U.S. Congresswoman for the 3rd District of Alabama and the first woman elected to represent Alabama in the U.S. Congress
- George W. Andrews, former U.S. Congressman for the 3rd District of Alabama
- Henry Babers, Christian evangelist, Bible teacher, and scholar
- Winton M. Blount, United States Postmaster General (1969–1972)
- John Warren Branscomb, bishop of the United Methodist Church
- Edith Burroughs, first African American to win a professional bowling tournament in the United States
- Helen Claire, Broadway actress
- John Henrik Clarke, Pan-Africanist
- Fate Echols, NFL player
- Lucy Feagin, first woman to operate a drama school in New York City
- Virginia Powell Goodwin, soprano and choir director. Pioneer singer in early recordings with Berliner Gramophone.
- Seal Harris, former heavyweight boxer
- Jimmy Hitchcock, first All-American football player at Auburn University
- Eddie Kendricks, co-founder of The Temptations
- Thom S. Rainer, President and CEO, LifeWay Christian Resources
- Tim Stowers, college football coach
- Mary Hardway Walker, one of the last surviving enslaved people

== Gallery ==
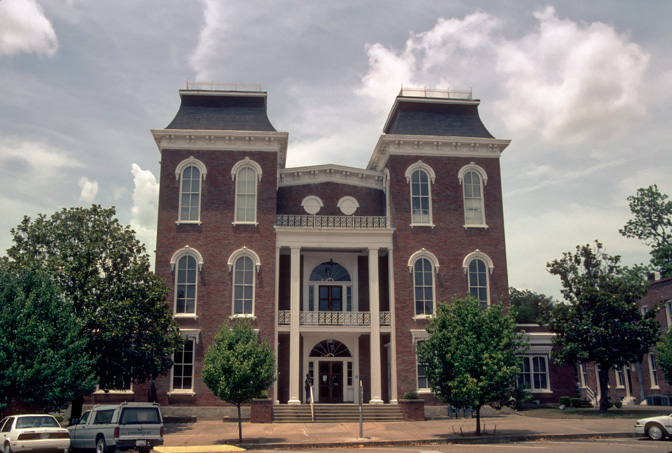
The Bullock County Courthouse in Union Springs is listed on the National Register of Historic Places.

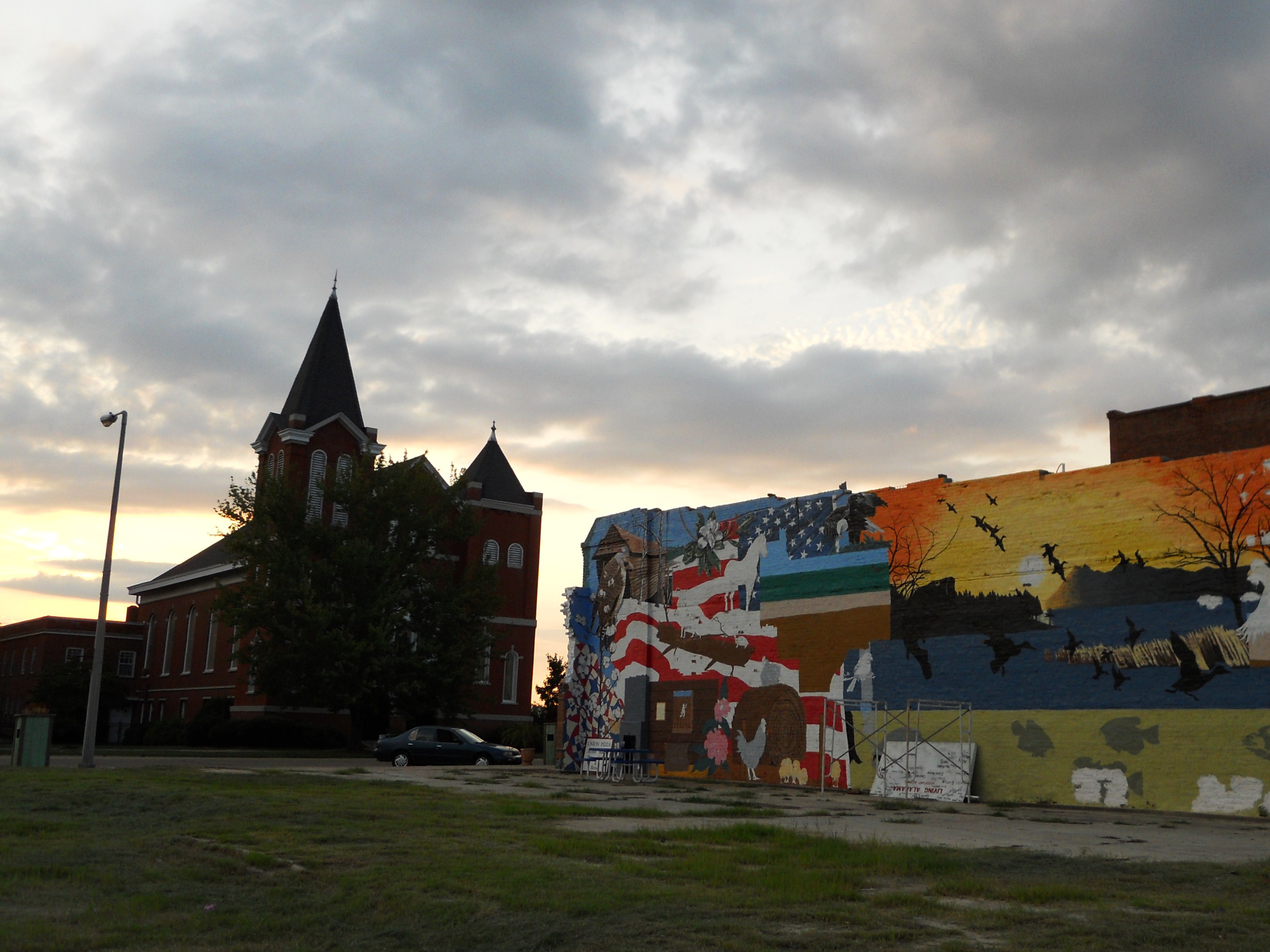
Union Springs at sundown

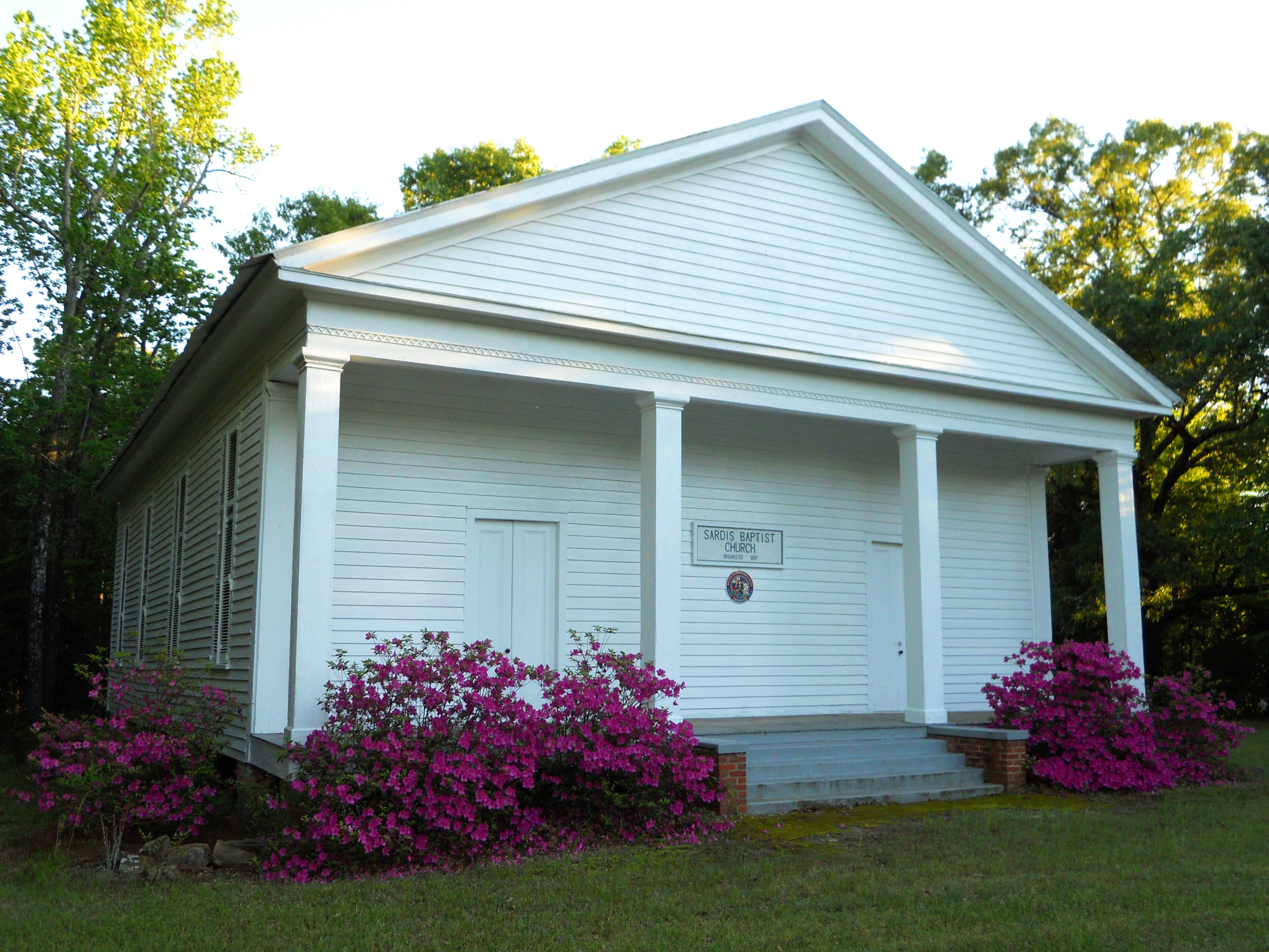
Sardis Baptist Church, located just outside Union Springs, was added to the National Register of Historic Places on November 29, 2001.

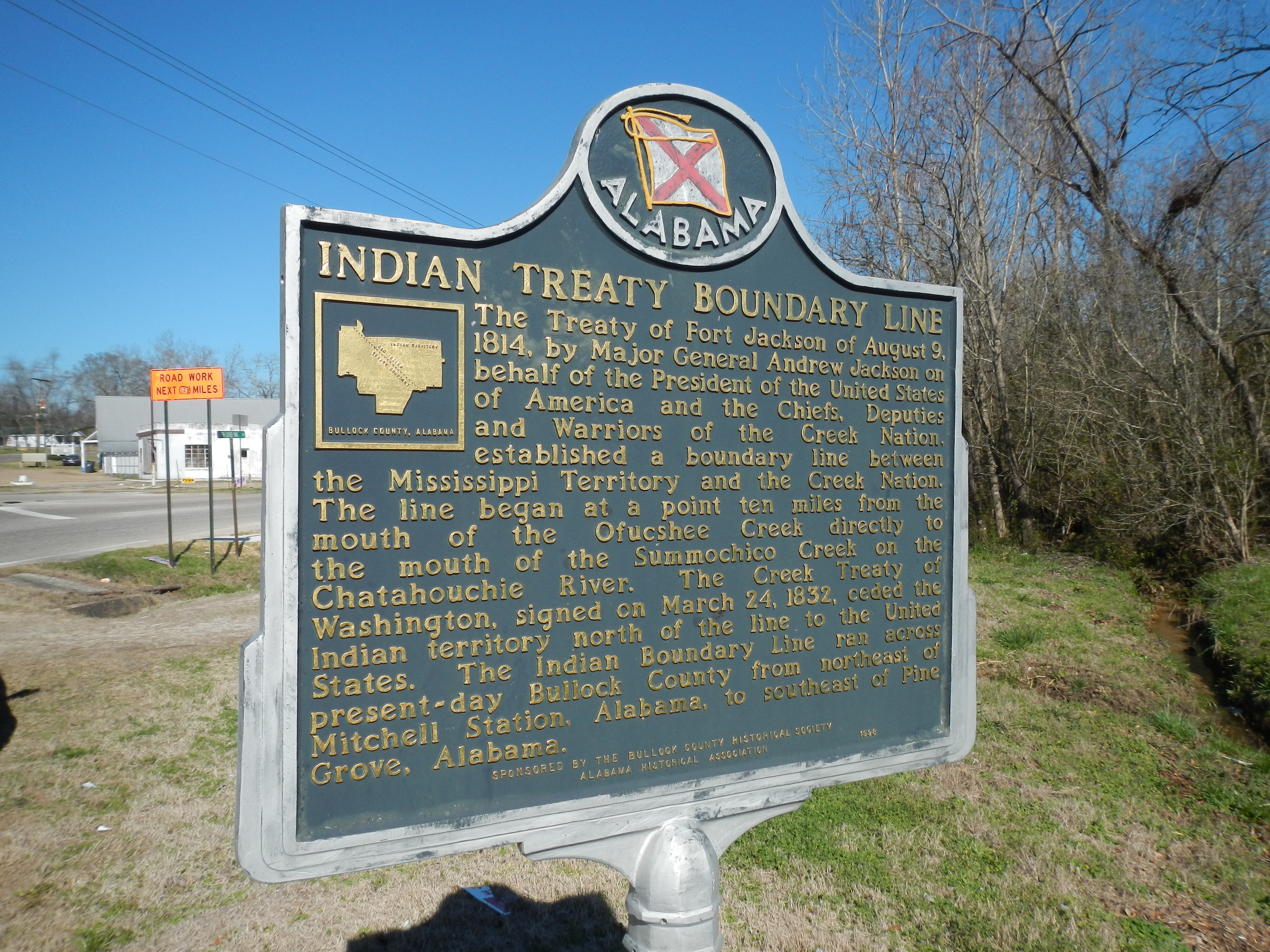
A historical marker near Union Springs shows the Indian Territory boundary line created by the Treaty of Fort Jackson.

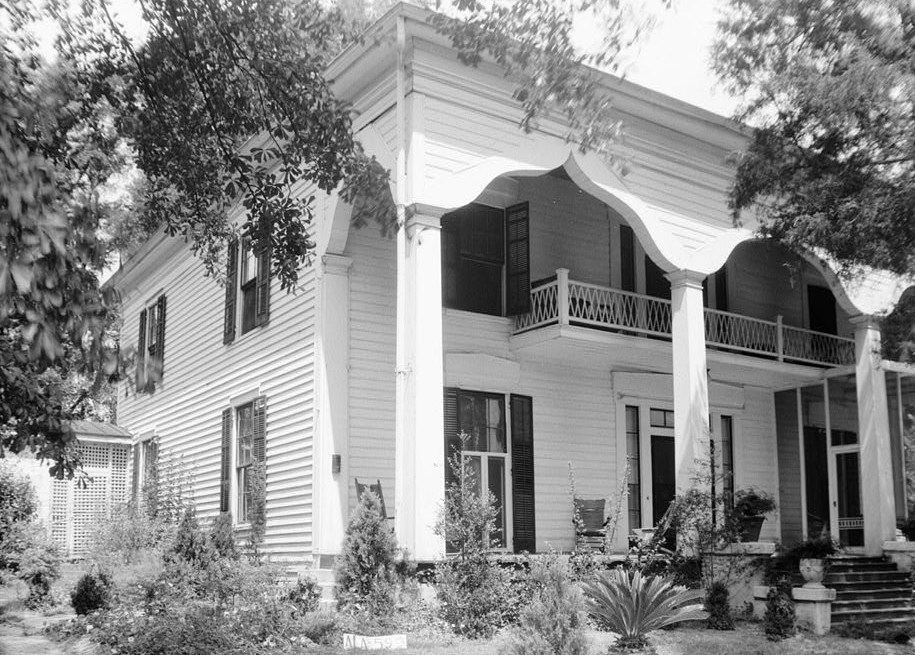
Foster House is listed on the National Register of Historic Places.

Bird dog monument, Life-size bronze statue of an English pointer
