= Alfred "Teen" Blackburn =

Confederate veteran and former slave

Alfred "Teen" Blackburn (April 26, 1842 – March 8, 1951) was one of the last surviving American slaves with a clear recollection of slavery as an adult. He was known throughout Yadkin County, North Carolina for his strength, size, and longevity. While enslaved, he served as a body servant for his owner, a Confederate soldier, during the Civil War. In 1929, state officials granted him a Class B pension in North Carolina, leading some to mistakenly describe him as a Confederate veteran.

== Birth into slavery ==
Blackburn was born into slavery on the plantation of the Hampton and Cowles families in Yadkin County, North Carolina. According to family accounts, he was called Teen and was the son of Fannie Blackburn, a mixed-race Cherokee-African held as a slave, and Augustus Blackburn, a white plantation owner.

The teen described holding "the best job" on the plantation as a boy. "It was my duty to shoo the flies from the table, serve at parties when the well-to-do...were guests, and take care of the children." He said the field slaves were envious of his job.

During the American Civil War, Blackburn served as the "body servant" of his father, Col. John Augustus Blackburn of Company F, 21st North Carolina Infantry Regiment. Blackburn's brother, Wiley Blackburn, was also listed as a body servant in Co. B, 38th North Carolina Regiment.

Blackburn was a cook, servant, and helper for the regiment for almost two years during battles, including the First Battle of Bull Run. In a 1938 interview, Blackburn said he did not carry a gun during his service because "a knife was handier." He described defending Col. Blackburn with his knife, "he just turned around and walked off," he said. "He didn't say a word."

However, his 1929 pension application does not describe him engaging in any battle, instead saying he spent most of his "service" on the Blackburn plantation, working with seven other slaves in its blacksmith's forge, making iron rims for Confederate wagons. It also describes him serving "as one of the guards to keep safe the family valuables, including valuable silverware, jewels, and provisions" during the war. The application makes clear he was not an enlisted soldier.

He returned to Yadkin County after Col. Blackburn was furloughed because of measles. At the close of the war, Blackburn described seeing Gen. George Stoneman's men in Hamptonville "riding three abreast and burning everything along the way."

== Post-Civil War ==
After the war, Teen Blackburn moved to Davie County and farmed for four years. Then, he worked for Sheriff Tom Watts. He next started work for Clayton Cooper Mines in Ashe County but quit after one day.

Blackburn returned to Hamptonville. In 1883, he became a contract mail carrier for the United States Post Office, supervising other carriers, black and white. He worked for 60 years, carrying the mail on foot and later by horse from Jonesville to Hamptonville, a distance of more than 10 miles (16 km) every other day.

In 1880, Blackburn married Lucy Carson, the daughter of Robert Carson, an uncle of Kit Carson. They had 10 children together. He worked other jobs around the county and on his 75-acre (300,000 m^{2}) farm, tending tobacco, in order to help give each of his children a formal education.

Blackburn died on March 8, 1951, at the age of 108. He is buried in the Pleasant Hill Baptist Church cemetery in Carsontown, a community in Iredell County south of Hamptonville.

== Legacy ==
The road in front of his house was named for him, as Teen Blackburn Road. His house survived on that road, south of U.S. Highway 21 and U.S. Highway 421, until being destroyed by a fire in December 2003.

== See also ==
- Slavery in the United States
- List of the last surviving American slaves
- List of slaves
- Cudjoe Lewis
- Sylvester Magee
- Eliza Moore
