= Feagin School of Dramatic Art =

School in New York City, United States

General information
- Coordinates: 40°45′33″N 73°58′41″W

The Feagin School of Dramatic Art (also Feagin School of Dramatic Radio and Arts) first located at Carnegie Hall, then later at 316 West 57th Street in New York City, was an early training site for actors Jeff Corey, Helen Claire, Angela Lansbury, Alex Nicol, and Cris Alexander. It was later relocated to the International Building at Rockefeller Center. The school was founded by Lucy Feagin.
