= Eliza Moore =

Former American slave

- Born: June 27, 1843; Alabama, U.S.
- Died: January 21, 1948 (aged 104); Cordova, Alabama, U.S.
- Known for: Last verified surviving African American slave

Eliza Moore (June 27, 1843 – January 21, 1948) was one of the last living African Americans proven to have been born into slavery in the United States. Her father's name was Judge Moore and Eliza was his only child which he had in his old age. Moore was born a slave in Montgomery County, Alabama, in 1843. She is considered by many historians as the last certifiable African American ex-slave in America. Moore is the only person to date whose claim can be supported due to adequate documentation.

During the American Civil War, Moore was known to be enslaved by Dr. Taylor, according to B. E. Bolser, of Mt. Meigs, Alabama. She married Asbury Moore, who was also an enslaved person, and they went to the Gilchrist Place in Cordova, Alabama, together as sharecroppers after the war. Eliza and Asbury had two children together, Asbury died in 1943 and was also said to be more than 100 years old. Eliza died five years after her husband's death.

It is reported that Eliza Moore had been living on the Gilchrist Place for about 65 or 70 years as a free woman at the time of her death in 1948.

Eliza Moore died at the age of 104 on January 21, 1948, at a home of a Charlie Brown Jr. on the Gilchrist Place in Montgomery County.

== See also ==
- List of slaves
- List of the last surviving American slaves
- Slavery in the United States
- Alfred "Teen" Blackburn
- Cudjoe Lewis
- Sylvester Magee
