= Charlie Smith (centenarian) =

American centenarian (died 1979)

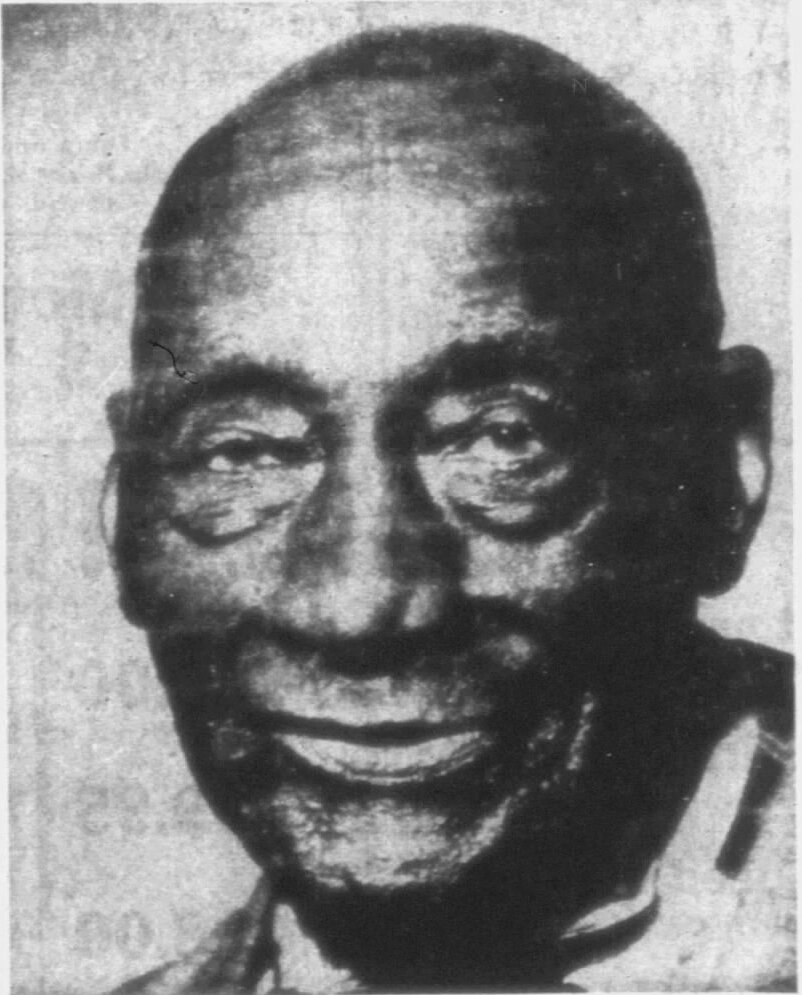
- Born: Mitchell Watkins; 1874 or 1879 (claimed 1842); Texas, United States (claimed Liberia)
- Died: October 5, 1979; Bartow, Florida, US
- Burial place: Wildwood Cemetery

Charlie Smith (died October 5, 1979) was an American longevity claimant noted for claiming to be the oldest person in the United States at the time of his death on October 5, 1979, at age 137. Bone age tests after his death in 1979 revealed that Smith was between 99–105 years old when he died.

== History ==
Smith stated that he had been born in Liberia in 1842, kidnapped to the United States at age 12 and sold into slavery in Louisiana to a Texas rancher. Later research indicated that he had been born circa 1874 or even later. In particular, his marriage certificate, issued January 8, 1910, listed him as being 35 years old at the time.

He was invited to view the launch of Apollo 17 in 1972 from the VIP area at the Kennedy Space Center. He amused reporters with his skeptical comments, asserting that "th' ain't nobody goin' t' no moon. Me, you, or anybody else" and, after the launch, "I see they goin' somewhere, but that don't mean nothin'."

Smith died in Bartow, Florida, on October 5, 1979. He was buried at Wildwood Cemetery.

== In popular media ==
The first film, "Charlie Smith at 131" (30 minutes) was made in 1973 and directed by Michael Rabiger for the BBC "Yesterday's Witness" series.

Smith's "life story" was dramatized on film in 1978 in a 90-minute episode of the PBS television series Visions titled "Charlie Smith and the Fritter Tree", with Smith portrayed by Glynn Turman. In the story, Smith comes to America in 1854 on the promise that there are "fritter trees" there. Tricked into slavery, he later escapes, joins the Union army and, after the war, heads out west where he chases Billy the Kid and rides with Jesse James.

== See also ==
- List of last survivors of American slavery
