= Bullock County High School =

Secondary school in Alabama, United States

Coordinates: 32°07′48″N 85°43′22″W

Location
- 911 Sardis Road; Union Springs, Alabama 36089

Information
- Former names: Union Springs High School; Carver High School
- Teaching staff: 25.00 (FTE)
- Grades: 9-12
- Enrollment: 448 (2024-2025)
- Student to teacher ratio: 17.92
- Website: https://bchs.bullockco.org/

Bullock County High School, originally named Union Springs High School and then Carver High School, is a public school serving about 440 student in grades 9 to 12 in Union Springs, Alabama. Hornets are the school mascot and black and old gold the school colors. It is in the Bullock County School District.

In 2019 a new tax was proposed to fund renovations of the district schools. The school's enrollment has dropped in recent decades. Kelvin James is the school's principal. The school has a large proportion of economically disadvantaged students.
