= Bullock County School District =

School district in Alabama, United States

Coordinates: 32.1448°N 85.7119°W

Address
- 108 Hardaway Avenue Union Springs, Alabama, 36089; United States

District information
- Type: Public
- Grades: PreK–12
- NCES District ID: 0100480

Students and staff
- Students: 1,434
- Teachers: 79.0
- Staff: 54.1
- Student–teacher ratio: 18.15

Other information
- Website: www.bullockco.org

Bullock County School District is a school district in Bullock County, Alabama, United States.

Statewide testing ranks schools in Alabama, with those in the bottom six percent are listed as "failing." As of early 2018, Bullock County High School was included in this category.

== Schools ==
- Bullock County High School
- South Highlands Middle School
- Bullock County Career Technical Center
- Union Springs Elementary School
