= Elizabeth Johnson Forby =

Formerly enslaved Tennessean (1846–1905)

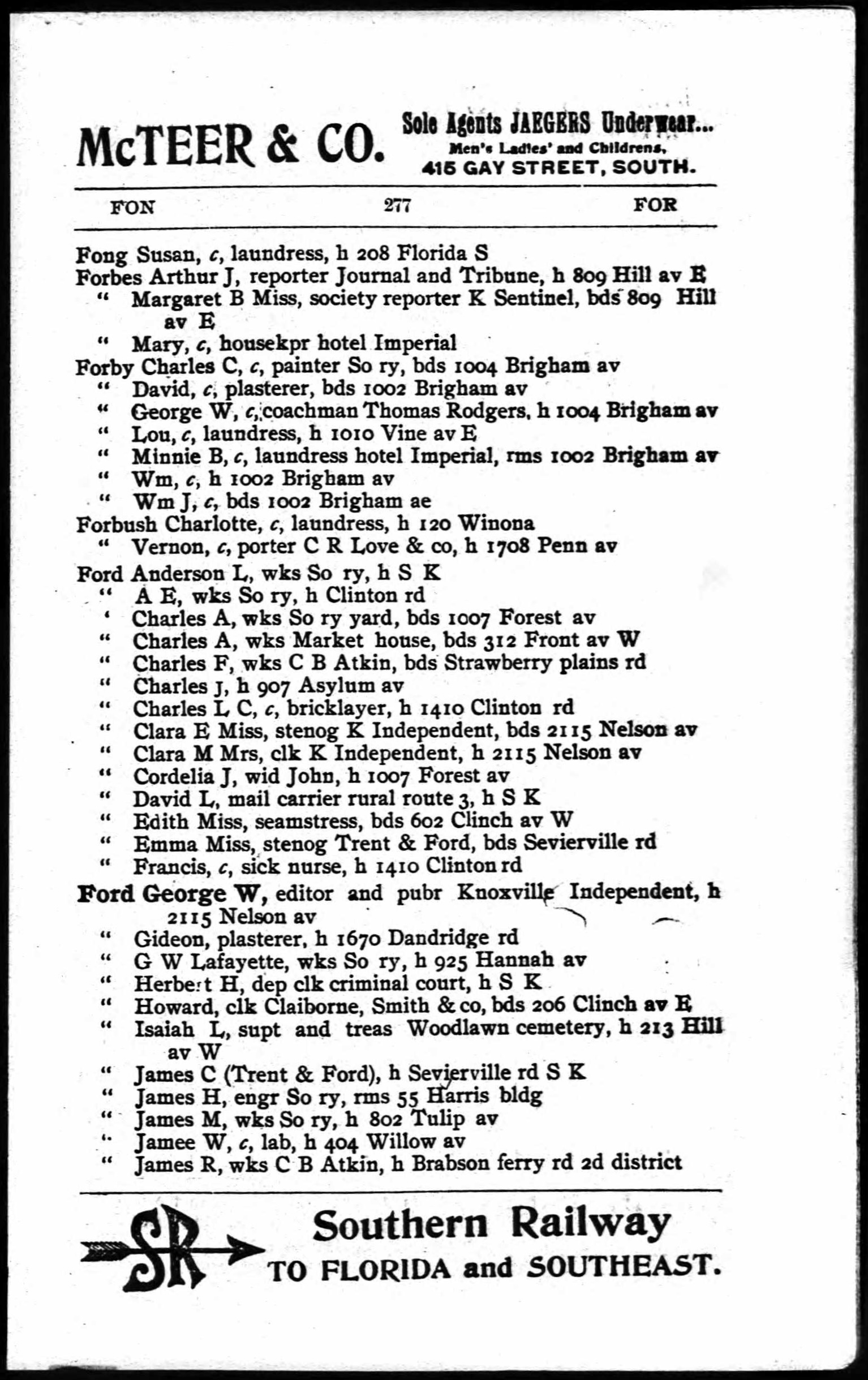
- Some members of the Forby family in the 1901 Knoxville city directory
- Born: Lucy Elizabeth; March c. 1846; Tennessee, United States
- Died: October 3, 1905; Knoxville, Tennessee, United States
- Other names: Liz, Lizzie Forbey, Lizzy, Lucy Elizabeth Johnson, Lucy E. Forby, Mrs. George Forbey, Mrs. G. W. Forby, Mrs. Elizabeth Ford, Elizabeth J. Farley, Farbey
- Known for: Enslaved by a future U.S. President, "estimable colored woman"
- Spouse: George Forby
- Children: 9
- Mother: Dolly Johnson
- Relatives: Florence Johnson Smith (sister); William Andrew Johnson (brother); Sam Johnson (uncle)

Lucy Elizabeth Johnson Forby (Note: The name is spelled Forby or Forbey across various records; this article uses Forby since that is the spelling that appears on her grave marker.) (March c. 1846 – October 3, 1905) was an "estimable colored woman" of the United States.

Lizzie Forby was a mixed-race Tennessean who was enslaved from birth until approximately age 17 by Andrew Johnson, later the 17th president of the United States. Her mother was Dolly Johnson; the identity of her father remains officially unknown. Since the late 20th century several scholars and popular historians have speculated or insinuated that Andrew Johnson may have been Lizzie's biological father, although there is no evidence that either affirmatively confirms the relationship or eliminates Johnson as a candidate for paternity. She married a freedman named George W. Forby shortly after the American Civil War. He worked as a laborer and a coachman, and together they raised nine children in East Tennessee.

Elizabeth Johnson Forby died at the age of approximately 60 in Knoxville, Tennessee. She is the only known member of her family to have a headstone marking their grave at Knoxville's historic Freedmen's Mission Historic Cemetery; the stone reads "Our Mother Elizabeth Johnson Forby died October 3, 1905".

== Biography ==
Lucy Elizabeth, often called Liz or Lizzie, was born in March 1846, in Tennessee, United States. (Note: Calculating a birth year based on her reported age at various times yields birth years ranging from 1844 to 1850.) She was the first-born child of Dolly Johnson, and her father was likely white. She reported that her father and mother had been natives of Tennessee. She was never taught reading or writing skills and was illiterate. The only record of her childhood is mention in a letter that Andrew Johnson had bought her and her sister Florence a "little chair" in 1854. The authors of the Andrew Johnson Biographical Companion (2001) argued that there were "no rumors of involvement of members of the Johnson family" in fathering Liz and Florence. However, echoing David Warren Bowen in Andrew Johnson and the Negro, they also stated that Liz and Florence "were treated somewhat as pets by the Johnson family." Elizabeth, like the rest of Andrew Johnson's personal slaves, is said to have been emancipated by him on August 8, 1863, when she would have been in her late teens. In 1864 and 1865, when Andrew Johnson was military governor of Tennessee, he "claimed pay toward wages, rations, and clothing for three servants: Henry, Florence, and Elizabeth (Liz)."

The first legal marriage, in Greene County, Tennessee, of two people who were likely former slaves appears to have been on June 29, 1865, when the county marriage ledger self-consciously records the wedding of "Samus Taylor of color to Polly McConister person of color". On Wednesday, September 5, 1866, Elizabeth Johnson married George W. Forby in Greene County, Tennessee. They were approximately the 18th black couple ever legally married in the county, although for whatever reason Liz's entry in the marriage book was not tagged "freedmen" or "people of color". Lizzie Johnson was probably between 20 and 22 years old at the time of her wedding. George W. Forby was about 22, having been born in the first half of the 1840s in Greeneville, Tennessee, to George and Rebecca Forbey. According to the U.S. National Park Service, which operates the Andrew Johnson National Historic Site, George Forby had formerly been enslaved by "Dr. John Shields of Timber Ridge". Elizabeth and George had at least nine children over the next 22 years: Tillman, Lillie, Mary Belle, Charles C., Bessie, Nellie, George, Samuel Johnson, and Dollie. In 1870 and 1880, according to U.S. census records, the Forbys lived in Greeneville; George Forby worked as a farmer. Circa 1875, Lizzie and some of her children were living on Mary Johnson Stover's farm in Carter County. This fact may be known because "in the last letter ever written by the former president, he mentions two formerly-enslaved individuals—William and Liz. To his daughter, Mary, he describes his upcoming trip to visit, stating 'William is very anxious to come and perhaps I may bring him as he is...desirous to see Liz and the children.'"

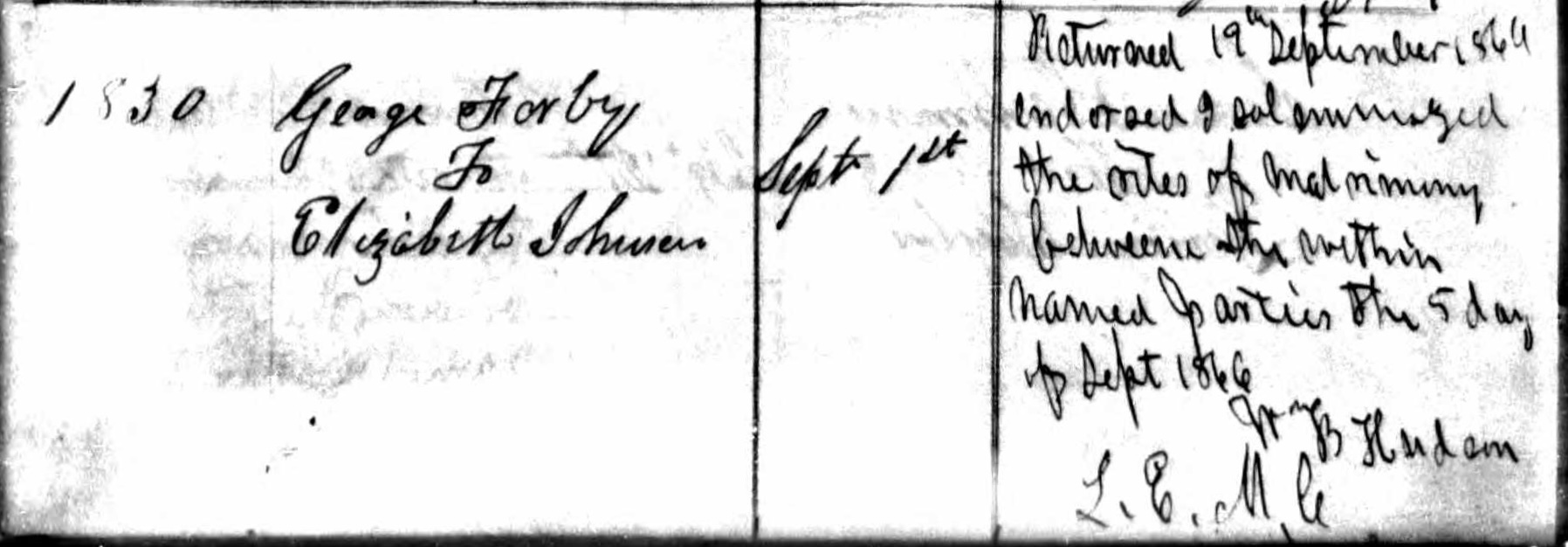
George Forby and Elizabeth Johnson in the Greene County marriage book

Tillman Forby, Lizzie's oldest child, and one Mary Forbey lived with Andrew Johnson's granddaughter Lillie Johnson Stover Maloney and Thomas Maloney as domestic servants in 1880. As she was dying from tuberculosis in 1883, Andrew Johnson's daughter Mary Johnson Stover prepared a will and bequeathed her assets to selected heirs. The balance of the estate went to her two married daughters but she also left some real estate, four acres of land in Greeneville, to Elizabeth Johnson Forby.

Tenth, to Lizzie Forbey, wife of Geo. Forbey, I give and devise for during her natural life only and after her death to her children [?] all my undivided interest whatever it may be in a certain tract of land lying and being in Greene Co. Tennessee known as the Johnson woodland tract a portion of which was sold to Samuel Johnson [?] by the heirs of my father and being apart of the same land on which he now lives.

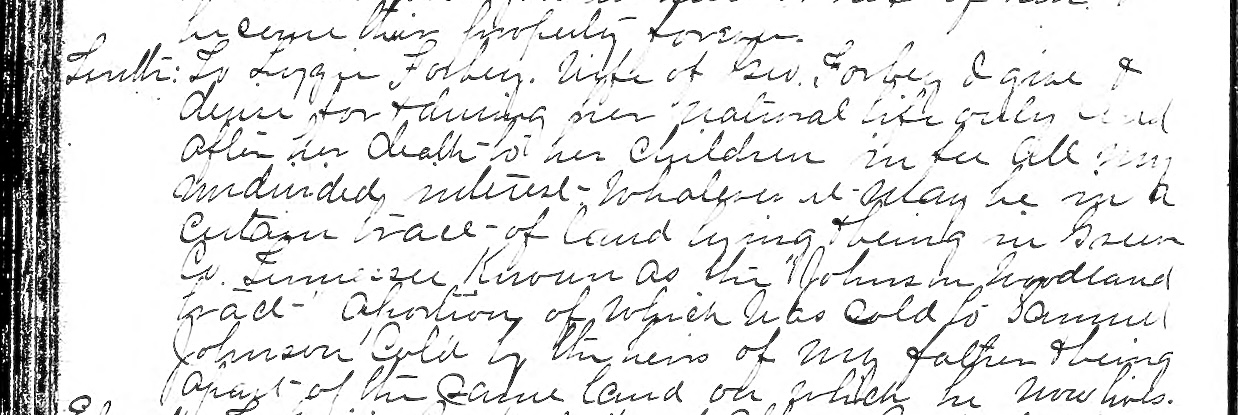
Excerpt from Stover's 1883 will

Around 1890, the Forby family moved from Greeneville (population 1,779) to Knoxville (population 22,535). George W. Forby and some of the children appear in the city directories of Knoxville for the next 40 years, give or take. George W. Forby (or possibly his son George Forby) is recorded in the directories of 1891 (occupation, porter, W. L. Warwick); 1894, residing 714 Temperance (occupation, teamster); 1895, residing 713 Mabry (occupation, coachman); 1897, residing 1004 Brigham (occupation, coachman for Miss M C White); 1898, residing 1004 Brigham; 1900, residing 1004 Brigham (occupation, teamster); 1901 (occupation, coachman); 1903; 1904 (occupation, coachman, Thomas Rodgers); 1906; 1915; and 1927.

Elizabeth J. Forby died in Knoxville, Tennessee on Tuesday, October 3, 1905, at 11 p.m. She was said to be 55 years old, and she had been living in Brigham Street. The cause of death was a "lingering illness of several months". She was buried on Friday, October 6 at Freedmen's Mission Historic Cemetery. One of the two newspaper notices of her death called her an "estimable colored woman," and listed her surname as Ford.

George and Liz had been married for almost 40 years when she died. George Forby lived with his children Mary Belle and Sam, and his son-in-law Dabney Wilson, in St. Louis, Missouri in 1920. George W. Forby died at the age of 86, in Roanoke, Virginia, on April 13, 1927. The informant on his death certificate was Liz and George's daughter Lillie Francis, a resident of Roanoke. His body was returned to Knoxville for burial.

== Descendants ==
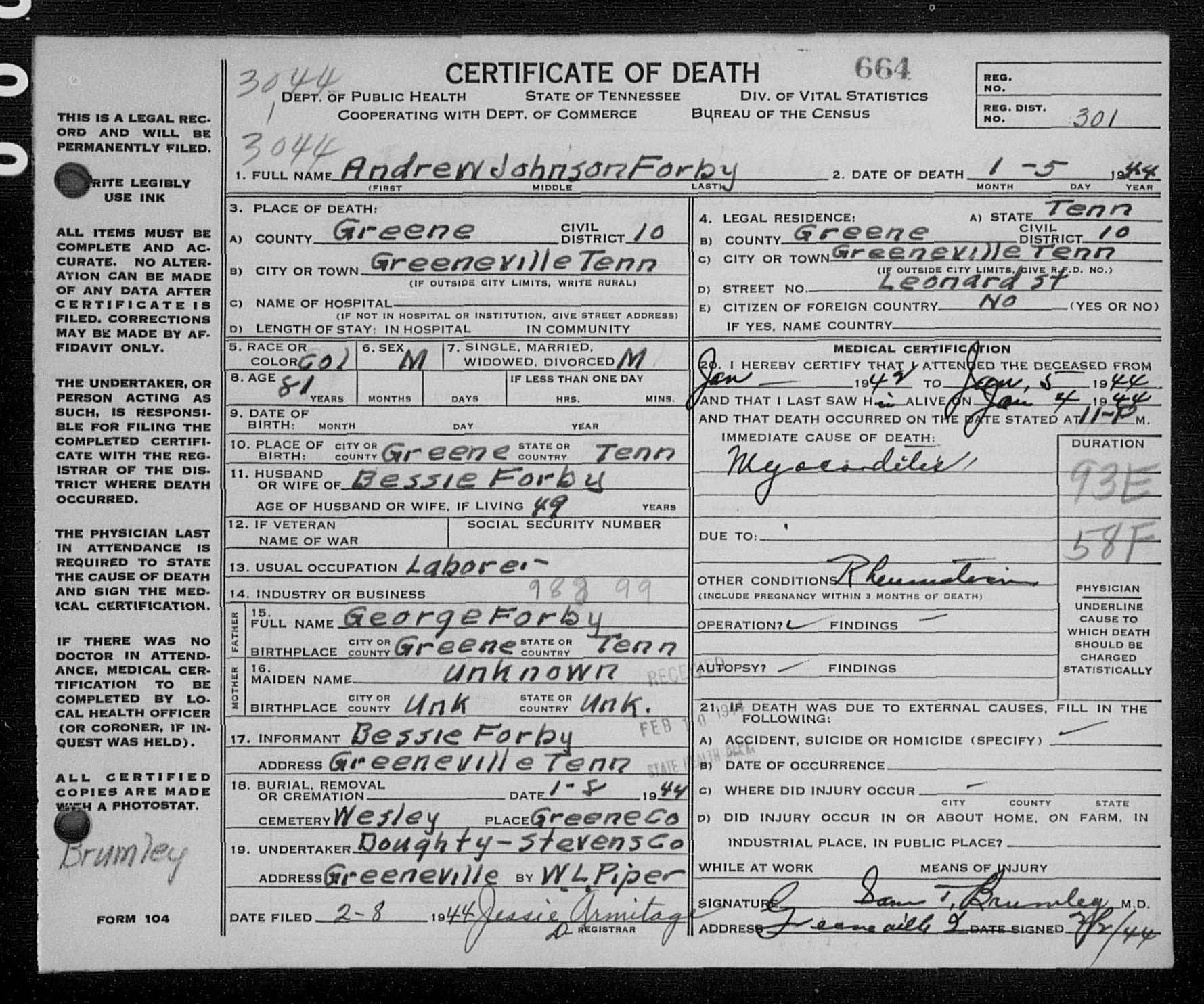
ANDREW JOHNSON FORBY: In his (in)famous Moses speech Andrew Johnson promised to lead the African-American people of Tennessee out of bondage; his contribution to the emancipation of Tennessee's enslaved no doubt inspired one of George Forby's kin in Greene County to name their child after the military governor

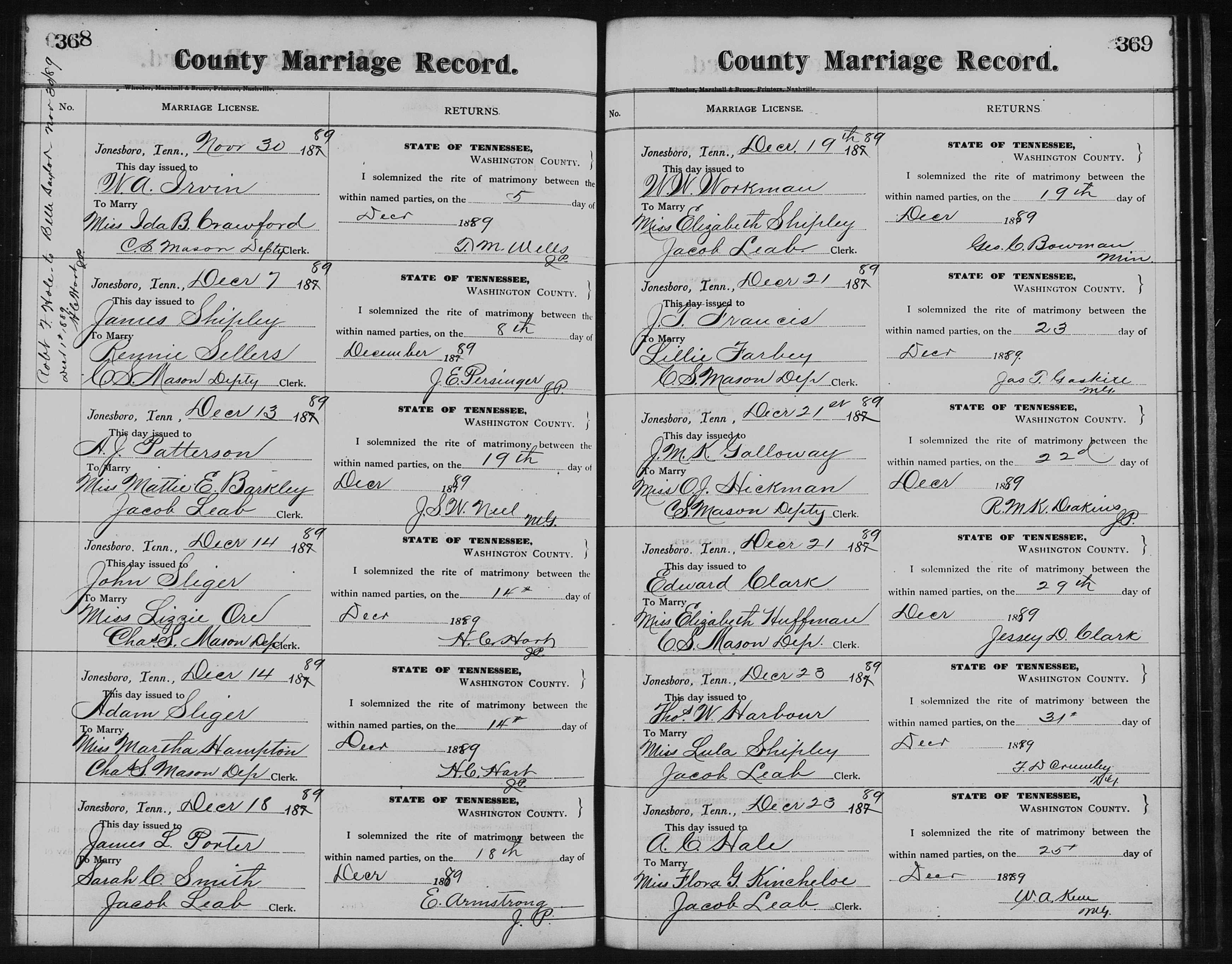
By coincidence, the December 1889 marriage records of Andrew Johnson's grandson Andrew J. Patterson and Dolly Johnson's granddaughter Lillie Forbey appear on the same page of the marriage record ledger of Jonesboro, Tennessee

- Tillman Forby, born ~1867 — seemingly disappears after 1880
- Lillie Forby, born ~1869 — she married a man named John T. Francis and moved to Roanoke, Virginia; they had at least one child; when Liz's brother William Andrew Johnson visited FDR at the White House in 1937, he hoped to stop in Roanoke, Virginia, on the return trip, to see a cousin
- Mary Belle Forby, born ~1870 — married more than once; lived with her father George, her brother Sam, and her husband Dabney Wilson in St. Louis in 1920
- Charles C. Forbey (October 9, 1873 – 1965) — Charles used the spelling Forbey; he married Esther Kent and had several children, and died in Missouri at the age 92.
- Bessie Forby, born ~1879 — Bessie is last known to be living with Belle in St. Louis in 1910; both sisters are single and working as servants for a "private family"
- Nellie Forby (February 4, ~1882 — 1982?) Nellie married Robert Davis, they had a stillborn son in 1922 who was buried at the Colored College Cemetery; another son was Robert Trigg Davis
- George Forby, born ~1883 — George Forby and Delia Hodge were licensed to wed in 1900, they were in court against each other in Knoxville in 1909, and they received a divorce decree from the court 1910; his whereabouts after that are unknown
- Samuel Johnson Forby (May 3, 1886 – February 14, 1945) — was a private in the 40th Company, 158th DB from 1918 to 1919; married Opal Lee in Sioux City, Iowa in 1925; they apparently divorced, he worked for a railroad and died in Proviso Township near Chicago, Illinois at age 58
- Dollie Forby, born ~1888 — her whereabouts after 1900 are unknown

== See also ==
- Andrew Johnson and slavery
- African Americans in Tennessee
- Tennessee in the American Civil War
- Reconstruction era
- Nadir of American race relations
- Great Migration (African American) § First Great Migration (1910–1940)
- Knoxville riot of 1919
- African American genealogy
