= Dolly Johnson =

Formerly enslaved Tennessean (1820s–1890s)

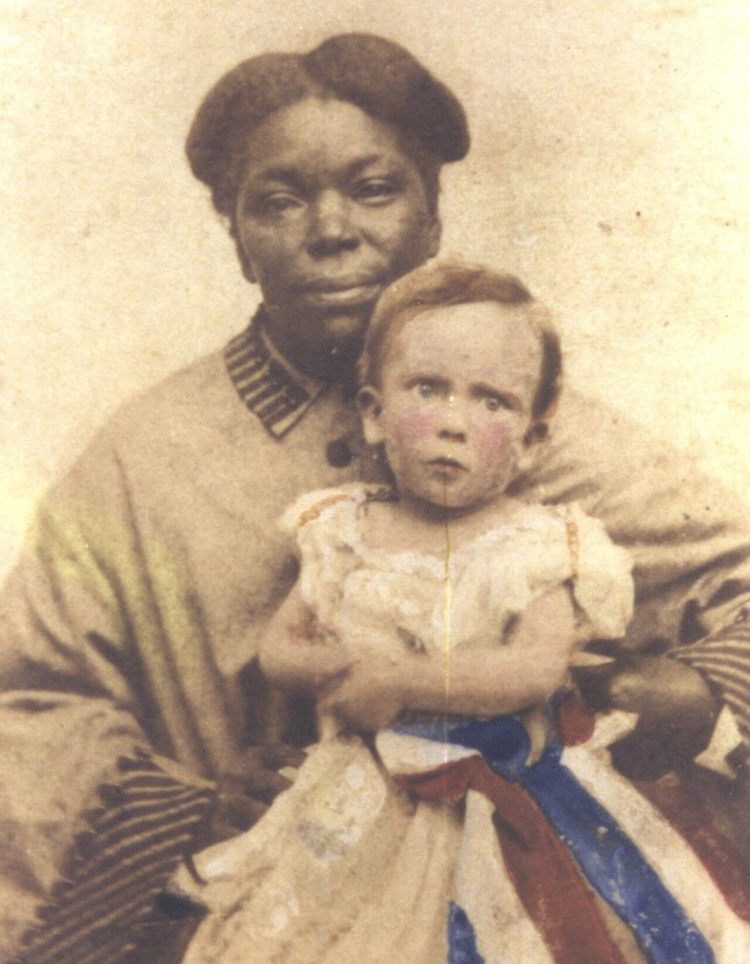
- Dolly Johnson about 1861, holding Andrew Johnson Stover; she was still legally enslaved at the time this photograph was made
- Born: 1825–1830; Tennessee, U.S.
- Died: after July 1887, possibly 1890‍–‍1892; Likely Tennessee
- Burial place: Unknown, possibly Freedmen's Mission Historic Cemetery, Knoxville
- Occupations: Domestic worker; bakery owner
- Known for: Enslaved by Andrew Johnson from 1843 to 1863
- Children: Liz; Florence; William Andrew
- Relatives: Sam Johnson (half-brother)

Dolly Johnson (born late 1820s, died after 1887), in later life known as Aunt Dolly, was a small-business owner and domestic worker, remembered in Greeneville, Tennessee as one of the best cooks in the region. Andrew Johnson, who became the 17th president of the United States in 1865, enslaved Dolly from 1843 until 1863. The paternity of Dolly Johnson's children, Elizabeth Johnson Forby, Florence Johnson Smith, and William Andrew Johnson, remains an open question in the study of the history of the United States.

== Early life ==
Dolly Johnson was born in Tennessee, sometime between 1825 and 1830. In the early 20th century, several newspaper accounts had it from both Andrew Johnson's descendants and Dolly Johnson's descendants that she was only 14 years old when she was purchased by Johnson, in which case her birth year would fall closer to 1830. She was reported to be 19 years old on slave-sale documents from 1843, which would put her birth year around 1824. After the American Civil War, Dolly Johnson reported to a U.S. census taker that both her mother and father had been born in Virginia, while Dolly herself may have been a native of the town of Parrottsville, Tennessee. Dolly was not taught how to read or write. Tennessee was one of three slave states that never passed anti-literacy laws, so it would have been legal under state law to educate an enslaved child.

Dolly first appears in the historical record as property of the Gragg family. Her time with them is not documented. The Graggs were a slave-owning white family with ties to several counties in Tennessee, including Greene County (where the Andrew Johnson National Historic Site stands today) and Cocke County (site of Parrottsville). A person named John W. Gragg Sr. wrote a will, dated February 8, 1842, which was proven November 1842 in Lincoln County, Tennessee. (Note: He bequeathed to his wife four people, including an enslaved family of three ("my negro man named Adam & negro woman Lucy & her son Robin" and "my negro man Gifford") and appointed his son John W. Gragg, Jr., as executor of his estate.) There is no mention of Dolly, but it is possible that Dolly was sold by the Gragg family at an estate sale, which was a common practice of the day.

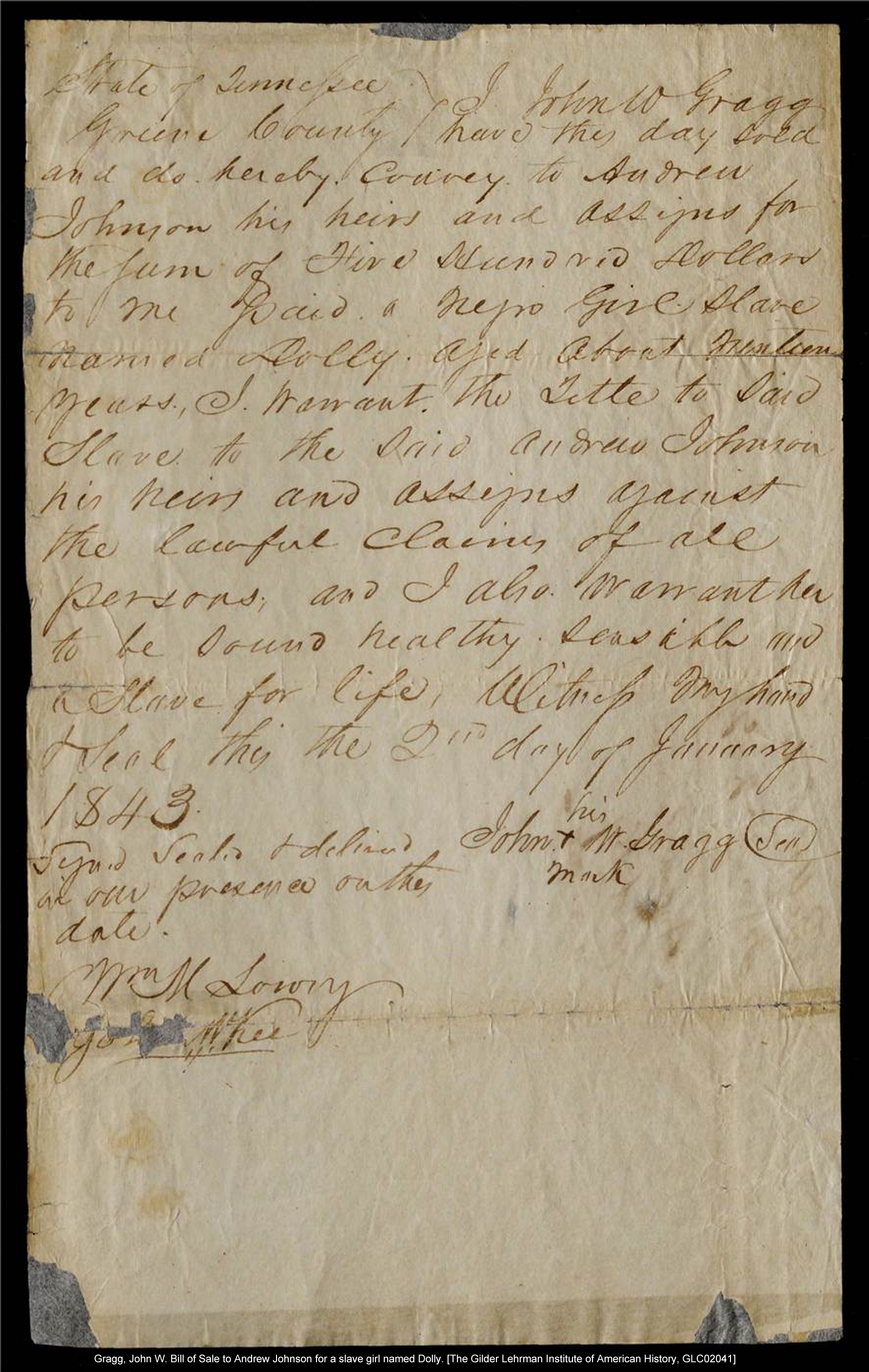
Bill of sale, for a slave girl named Dolly, from John W. Gragg to Andrew Johnson, dated January 2, 1843 (Gilder Lehrman Collection #GLC02041)

On November 29, 1842, Andrew Johnson bought his first slave, a boy named Sam, for US$541 (equivalent to about $18,050 in 2025), from Elim Carter. Sam was said to be Dolly's younger half-brother or brother. On January 2, 1843, Andrew Johnson bought Dolly, "aged about nineteen years", from John W. Gragg for US$500 (equivalent to about $17,280 in 2025). In 1929, Dolly's son William A. Johnson told the Knoxville News-Sentinel that Andrew Johnson bought Dolly "from a man named McMurtry at Newport". (Note: Newport is the county seat of Cocke County, Tennessee.) Three years later Knoxville columnist Bert Vincent got a similar quote from Johnson about the sale of his mother: "Massa Johnson bought my mammy and my uncle Samuel off a block at Newport for $1049." Five years after the interview with Vincent and almost 100 years after the fact, Dolly's son again told a reporter (in this case Ernie Pyle) his version of the story of the purchase: "My mother was a good-looking woman. Her owner sold her at a big auction in Greeneville. She looked around the crowd of buyers before the auction started, and she saw Andrew Johnson and liked his looks. So she went up to him and asked him if he wouldn't buy her. He bid her in for five hundred dollars." The bill of sale for Dolly is held in the collection of the Gilder Lehrman Institute of American History in New York and reads as follows: (Note: The bills of sale for Dolly and Sam were apparently once in the possession of Col. Fay Warrington Brabson, a Johnson biographer and native Tennessean.)

I, John W. Gragg ... have this day sold and do hereby convey to Andrew Johnson his heirs and assigns for the sum of Five Hundred Dollars to me paid a Negro Girl Slave named Dolly: aged about Nineteen years, I warrant the Title to Said Slave to the Said Andrew Johnson his heirs and assigns against the lawful claims of all persons, and I also warrant her to be sound healthy sensible and Slave for life ...

Dolly Johnson's parents were born in Virginia; she and her children lived most of their lives in East Tennessee

Historian Brenda Wineapple wrote of the transaction:

Dolly recalled that she'd been for sale at auction when it was she who spotted Johnson. Liking his looks, she asked him to buy her, which he did. Whether Dolly's account is true or not, it does suggest there may have been attraction between them—or that Dolly preferred a story in which she was not passive. Whatever happened, by the laws of the day Johnson was her owner, the master. Years later a rumor circulated to the effect that Johnson had fathered at least one, if not all three, of Dolly's light-skinned children—although it was also said that Johnson's son Robert had fathered Dolly's youngest. Such allegations would surprise no one, then or later. It's also true that political enemies often accused one another of miscegenation.

— The Impeachers (2020)

Historian David Warren Bowen argues in Andrew Johnson and the Negro that Sam and Dolly were purchased in part to demonstrate an increase in the class status of the once-impoverished Johnsons, rather than because the family had significant unmet needs for labor. According to Frederic Bancroft in Slave-Trading in the Old South, young female slaves were also considered an excellent financial investment: "Not only real estate, but also stocks, bonds and all other personal property were little prized in comparison with slaves...Absurd as it now seems, slaves, especially girls and young women, because of prospective increase, were considered the best investment for persons of small means."

== 1843–1861 ==
When he bought teenage Dolly in 1843, Andrew and Eliza were parents to four children, aged 15, 13, 11 and nine. Dolly was roughly the same age as the oldest child, Martha. For the next 20 years, from 1843 to 1863, Dolly Johnson was enslaved by the Johnson family, presumably working as a housekeeper and cook, which were her declared occupations after emancipation.

In March 1846, when she was between 16 and 21 years old, Dolly Johnson became a mother herself with the birth of her daughter Lucy Elizabeth, called Liz or Lizzie. Liz was born in Tennessee to parents who were both born in Tennessee. Dolly's second child, also a daughter, named Florence, was born approximately 1850 in "Green, Tn." Dolly was approximately 20 to 25 years old at the time. The father of Liz and Florence was never named in any known historical document, and the paternity of Dolly Johnson's children remains officially unknown. As historian Annette Gordon-Reed notes: "Dolly, who was described in the census as black, would give birth to three children ... listed as 'mulattoes,' which suggests that they had been fathered by a white man or an extremely light-skinned black man."

Names of individual slaves were not usually recorded on the slave schedules of the U.S. censuses of 1850 and 1860, but Dolly is believed to be the 24-year-old black woman enumerated as one of four slaves owned by A. Johnson in Division 9 in Greene County in 1850. The four-year-old and two-year-old female mulatto children listed are believed to be Liz and Florence, and the 20-year-old male would be Sam. According to the U.S. National Park Service, Dolly may have had a third-born baby who died in infancy or childhood.

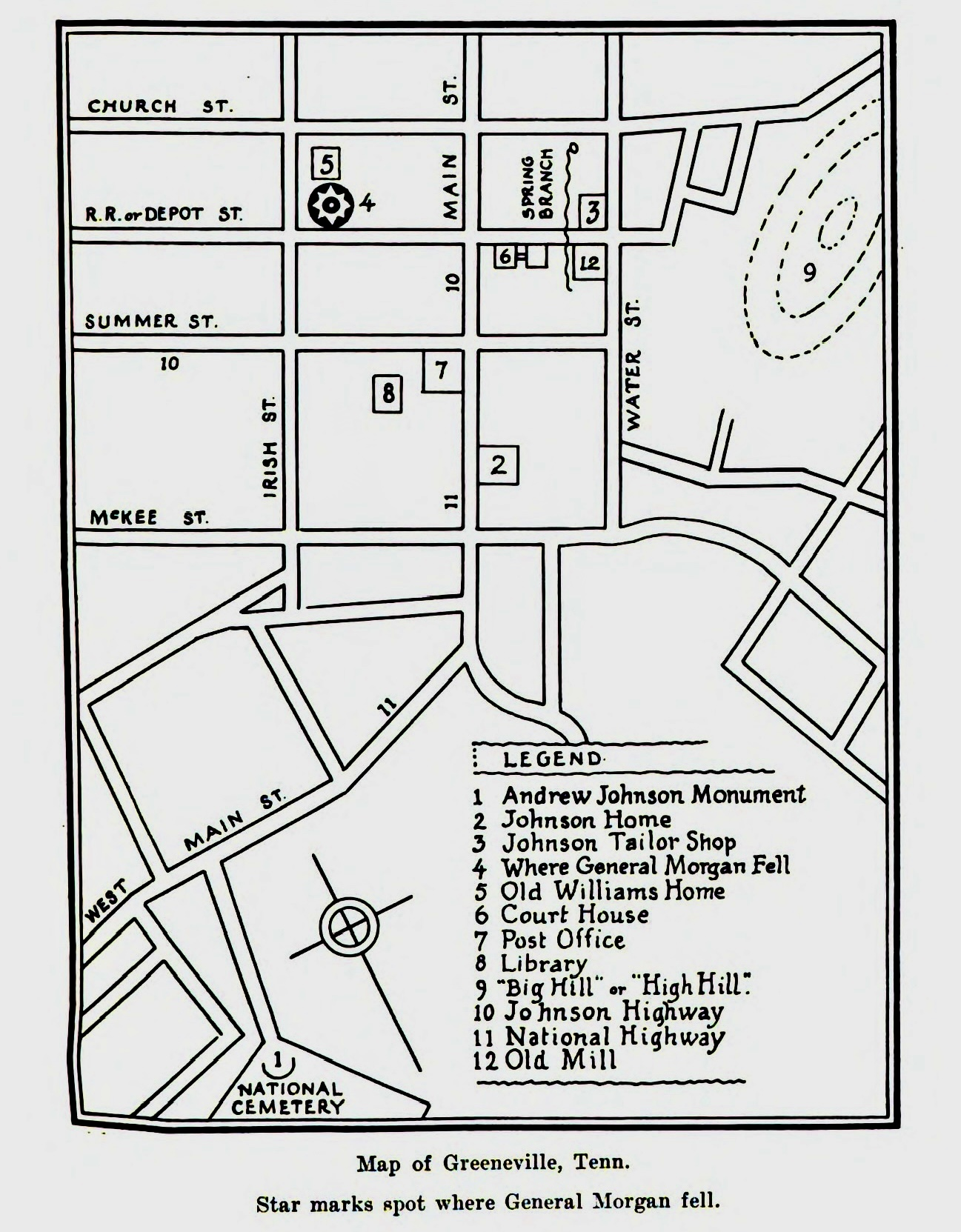
Greeneville, Tennessee landmarks from Andrew Johnson, Plebeian and Patriot (1928) by Robert W. Winston, including the location of the spring, and the sites of the Johnson house and the tailor shop

In 1851, Andrew Johnson bought an eight-room, three-floor brick house in Greeneville, Tennessee, which would be his home base for the remainder of his life, and where Dolly would have worked. According to the Robert W. Winston biography of Johnson published in 1928, Johnson's slaves "lived in a cabin, about 20 ft (6.1 m) by 30 ft (9.1 m), located on the premises and not far from the spring". In 1852, Eliza McCardle Johnson, Andrew Johnson's wife of 25 years, had her fifth and last child, Andrew "Frank" Johnson Jr., born 18 years after the birth of her fourth child. In 1854, Governor Johnson wrote a letter to his second-born son Robert, aged 20, that included this statement: "I have bought a basket and some other little notions for your little brothe[r] and a little chair for Liz and Florence &c." At the time, Liz was eight years old, Florence was six, and Frank was two.

On February 8, 1858, when she was between 28 and 33 years old, and approximately eight to ten years after the birth of Florence, Dolly Johnson gave birth to her only son, William Andrew Johnson. According to Jesse J. Holland in The Invisibles: The Untold Story of African American Slaves in the White House, this child received two Johnson family names. William was the first name of Andrew Johnson's "beloved brother", and Andrew was, of course, the first name of former Tennessee governor Andrew Johnson, just then the newly elected junior U.S. Senator from Tennessee. William Andrew Johnson was interviewed in 1932 by columnist Vincent, who quoted Johnson as saying, "Massa named hisself. He called me William Andrew." The father of William Andrew Johnson is identified on his death certificate as Andrew Johnson's fourth-born son with Eliza, Robert Johnson. Robert Johnson was between four and nine years younger than Dolly Johnson, and the year following William Andrew's birth was elected representative to the Tennessee state legislature. In 1943, Andrew Johnson's great-granddaughter Margaret Johnson Patterson stated that William Andrew Johnson was the only one of Dolly's children to have been born in Greeneville.

In June and July 1860, census workers assembled the slave schedules for Greene County, Tennessee. The five enumerated slaves of Andrew Johnson appear in district 14 of that county. The ages and sexes of the children match those of Dolly's children, Liz, Florence, and William A. William A. Johnson recalled this period of the family's life when interviewed in 1937: "Mr. Andrew Johnson would hold me on one knee and my sister on the other, and he'd rub our heads and laugh."

The next appearance of Dolly Johnson in the documentary record is a photograph. She was photographed holding Andrew Johnson Stover, the grandson of Andrew Johnson by his younger daughter Mary. Andrew Johnson Stover was born March 6, 1860, so the photograph can be roughly dated to 1861. The apparent quality of Dolly's gown may reflect that Andrew Johnson, a tailor by profession, was "always impeccably dressed" and widely known for the "remarkably neat appearance of his apparel".

== 1861–1875 ==
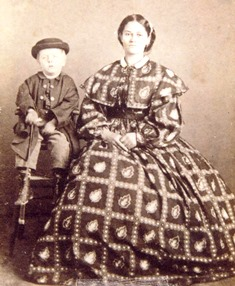
Andrew Johnson Stover and Florence Johnson, photographed sometime in the 1860s; Johnson was a teenager at the time this photo was taken

The American Civil War began with the firing on Fort Sumter in April 1861. On March 4, 1862, President Abraham Lincoln appointed U.S. Senator Andrew Johnson to be the military governor of Tennessee. Nearly 70 years later, Dolly's son William Johnson described to a reporter an experience they had during this period:

[Andrew Johnson] was trying to keep Tennessee in the Union, and as he spoke on the capitol grounds, two shots were fired at him by secessionists. The bullets entered trees near him .... My mother had me with her near Marse Andrew when the shots were fired. She took me and ran as fast as she could, not stopping until she got to the basement of the house, which was on Cedar Street.

— Knoxville News-Sentinel (1929)

In 1863, according to University of Virginia history professor Elizabeth R. Varon:

Fearing that emancipation by federal edict would alienate Tennessee's slaveholding Unionists, Johnson urged that the state be exempted from the Emancipation Proclamation, so he could promote the issue from the inside: in August 1863, Johnson freed his own slaves, seeking to set an example for his fellow Tennesseans.

Johnson variously claimed to have owned a total of eight to 10 slaves. The exact number of people enslaved by Johnson during his lifetime remains "surprisingly difficult to determine". Parts of Tennessee and Kentucky celebrate August 8 as Emancipation Day, possibly because that was the day on which, according to family lore, Andrew Johnson freed Sam, Liz, Florence, William, and Dolly Johnson; Sam Johnson was involved in organizing early celebrations of Tennessee's Emancipation Day and may be responsible for popularizing the commemoration on August 8, specifically. Johnson did not, however, personally convey the news of the liberation of his slaves. According to William Johnson, "Mrs. Johnson called us all in and said we were free now. She said we were free to go or could stay if we wanted to. We all stayed."

After freedom, the former slaves stayed with Andrew Johnson as paid servants. Most of the family moved to Washington, D.C., when Andrew Johnson became president following the assassination of Abraham Lincoln, although Dolly and William, aged seven, reportedly remained in East Tennessee. Dolly's daughter Florence worked at the White House as a maid. Of this era, Sarah Stover, older sister of Andrew Johnson Stover, wrote in her diary later in life, "my mind wanders back to the days when we children used to have a black mama as well as our own dear mama, but thank God the race is free. I think slavery is a sin". In an 1866 meeting with Frederick Douglass and other African-American leaders about the place of the freedmen in Johnson's version of Reconstruction, "Johnson made insensitive statements regarding slavery as a practice, telling the group: 'I might say, however, that practically, so far as my connection with slaves has gone, I have been their slave instead of their being mine. Some have even followed me here, while others are occupying and enjoying my property with my consent.'"

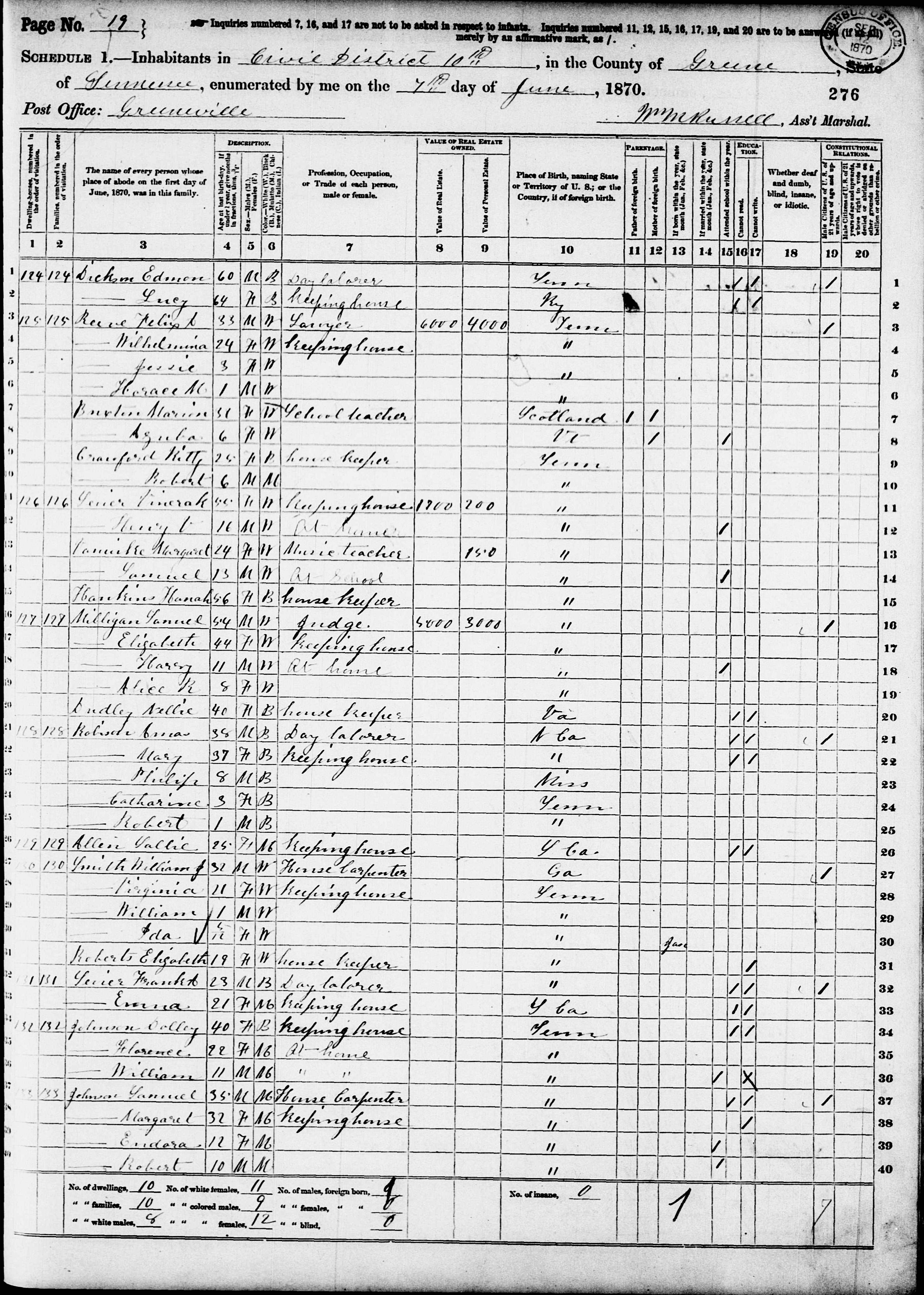
Dolly Johnson and Sam Johnson had neighboring households in Greeneville in 1870

As Johnson's presidential term was coming to an end in March 1869, a reporter from Cincinnati visited Greeneville and met Sam Johnson's wife Margaret and two of his children, and "Aunt Dolly." At that time Sam's family lived in the old tailor shop, and Dolly lived in a two-room, one-chimney building that had once been home to Andrew Johnson's mother-in-law. According to the Cincinnati report:

Aunt Dolly and Sam are the only negroes Johnson ever owned. Dolly says he was a very kind master, she having lived in the family for some thirty years. She says he quit the tailor business about the time he bought her and never worked at it anymore. To use her language, 'Mr. Johnson kept going up and up after he bought me.'

— "Andrew Johnson: Sketch of the President", Nashville Republican Banner, March 1869

Dolly Johnson and her youngest two children appeared in the U.S. census under their own names for the first time in 1870. Her work was listed as keeping house, and while she was illiterate, her daughter Florence could read and write, and her son William was attending school. Dolly Johnson lived in close proximity to Andrew Johnson, occupation "Ex Pres, Retired." Florence Johnson, age 22, was dually enumerated. In addition to being listed in her mother's household, she was enumerated as a cook in Andrew Johnson's household. Young William was also present in the household: "After he came back from Washington I was with him all the time. I slept right in the same room with him." William A. Johnson stayed in Andrew Johnson's room after Andrew suffered a stroke, nursed him through his final illness, and was with him when he died in 1875. A contemporary neurologist credited William with astute observation skills and his clinically valuable description of Johnson experiencing "one of the earliest known cases" of the medical condition asomatognosia.

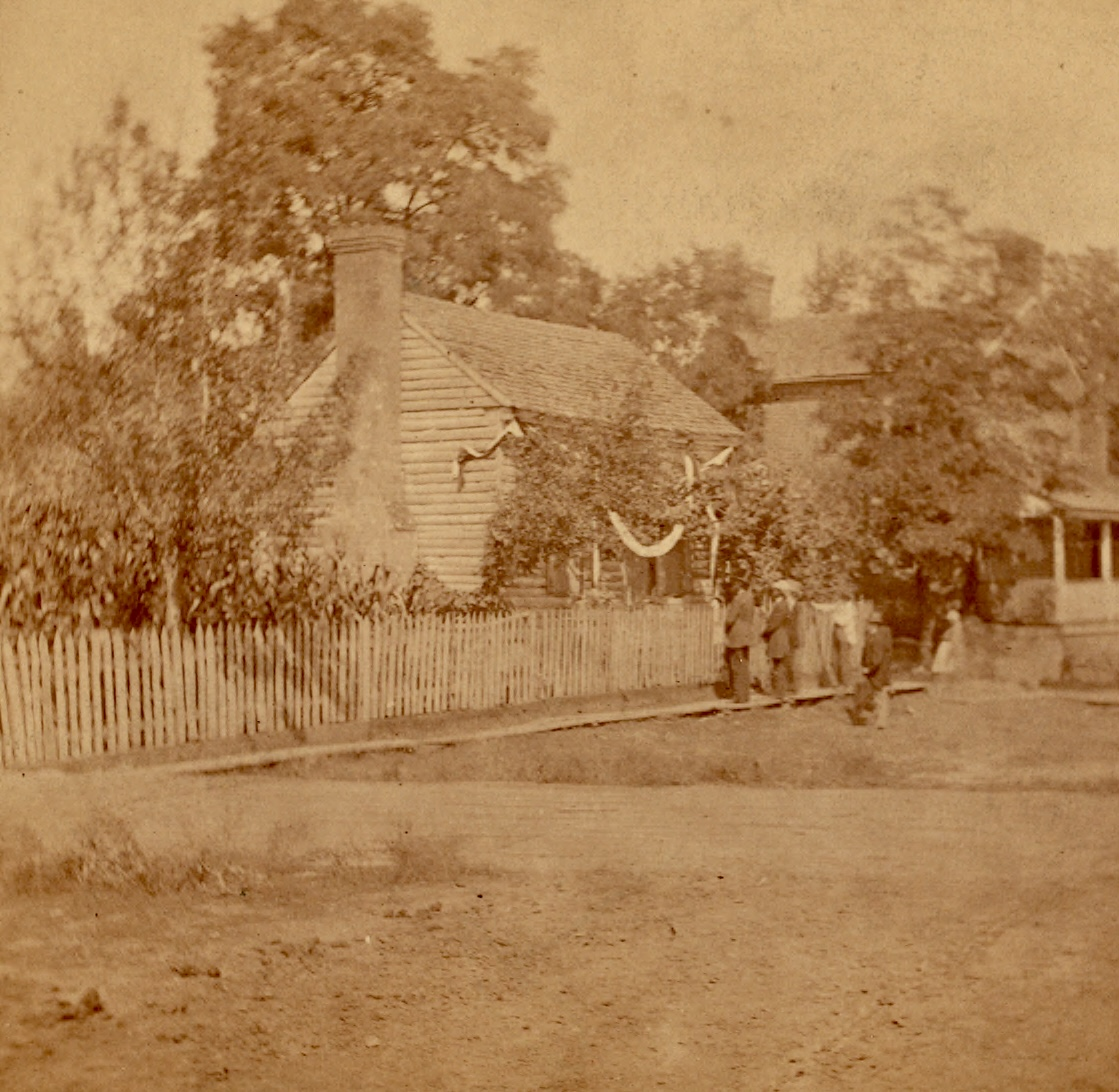
Dolly Johnson lived in Andrew Johnson's old tailor shop in what is now called the Greeneville Historic District; the exterior of the building is decorated with patriotic bunting for Johnson's 1875 funeral.

Sometime after freedom in 1863 and before his death in 1875, Andrew Johnson gave Dolly Johnson a cherrywood writing desk, a mahogany chest of drawers, and two "black china" turkey platters. These were passed down to Dolly's son William A. Johnson, who sold them in 1930, perhaps due to financial distress. William Johnson also recalled that Dolly Johnson was given bed frames, bed linens, a pair of linen pillowcases, a drop-leaf table, and cooking utensils. Johnson also inherited a family-favorite cake pan, and had "many little trinkets" given to him by Andrew Johnson, and family photos; the trinkets and photos burned in a fire at a hotel where he worked in Knoxville. Andrew Johnson died intestate—"for some unexplained reason, Johnson, whose estate exceeded US$100,000 (equivalent to $2,931,818 in 2025), left no will." However, per William Andrew Johnson, when the former president died, "he left a house and some land to his ex-slaves."

== Later life ==
By 1880, 21-year-old William had moved out of his mother's house, and at the time of the decennial federal census was living with the family of his older sister Liz Johnson Forby. Dolly's 14-year-old grandson, Tillman Forby, is dually enumerated in his parents' household and as a domestic servant in the home of Andrew Johnson's granddaughter, Lillie Stover Maloney. Several of Dolly Johnson's grandchildren were given names that overlapped with the given names of Andrew Johnson's family (including Andrew, Charles, Lillie, and Belle). Dolly Johnson appears to be absent from the 1880 census of Greene County, but an 1881 news item in the "Home and Neighborhood News" column of the Greeneville Herald reported that "Dolly Johnson, colored, has established a bakery in town."

In 1886, a reporter from the New York Mail and Express visited Greeneville and met "Aunt Dolly Johnson, a former slave of the late President", then in her late 50s or early 60s. The article appeared on December 2, 1886, in the New York Mail and was reprinted 14 days later in the Iowa State Register. The reporter was underwhelmed by his first two destinations in Greeneville, homes in which the president had once lived; not so the third stop on the tour, Johnson's old tailor shop, which was located along Richland Creek in the southern half of old Greeneville.

The tailor shop, where his fortunes began, is a place of no little interest. A single room, 14 ft (4.3 m) by 20 ft (6.1 m) feet, scarcely a step from the sidewalk, on a by-street, old and dilapidated, a muddy branch near, a shackling fence without a gate, two planks nailed from post to post across the opening near the ground ... a low doorway passed, the writer stood within the walls, upon a rough, pieced-up floor of wide plank, badly worn and wearing many other marks of age. Two small windows, with glass panes and solid board shutters hanging from the outside, lighted the room, which is furnished with two beds, some chairs, and sundry household articles, the property of the present occupant, Aunt Dolly Johnson, a former slave of the late President. The house was given to her by her late mistress, Mrs. Johnson, who died subsequently to her husband, and is occupied by herself and her family as a home. Aunt Dolly supports herself by a small bakery up town. She will kindly give each tourist a splinter from some portion of the house where old master wielded his needle, thimble and shears, while his mind roamed in greater fields. It is her delight to talk of him and his family in the olden days, and show a large photograph which hangs upon her walls. "It looks just like him," she says, "and he gave it to Dolly himself."

— New York Mail via Iowa State Register, 1886

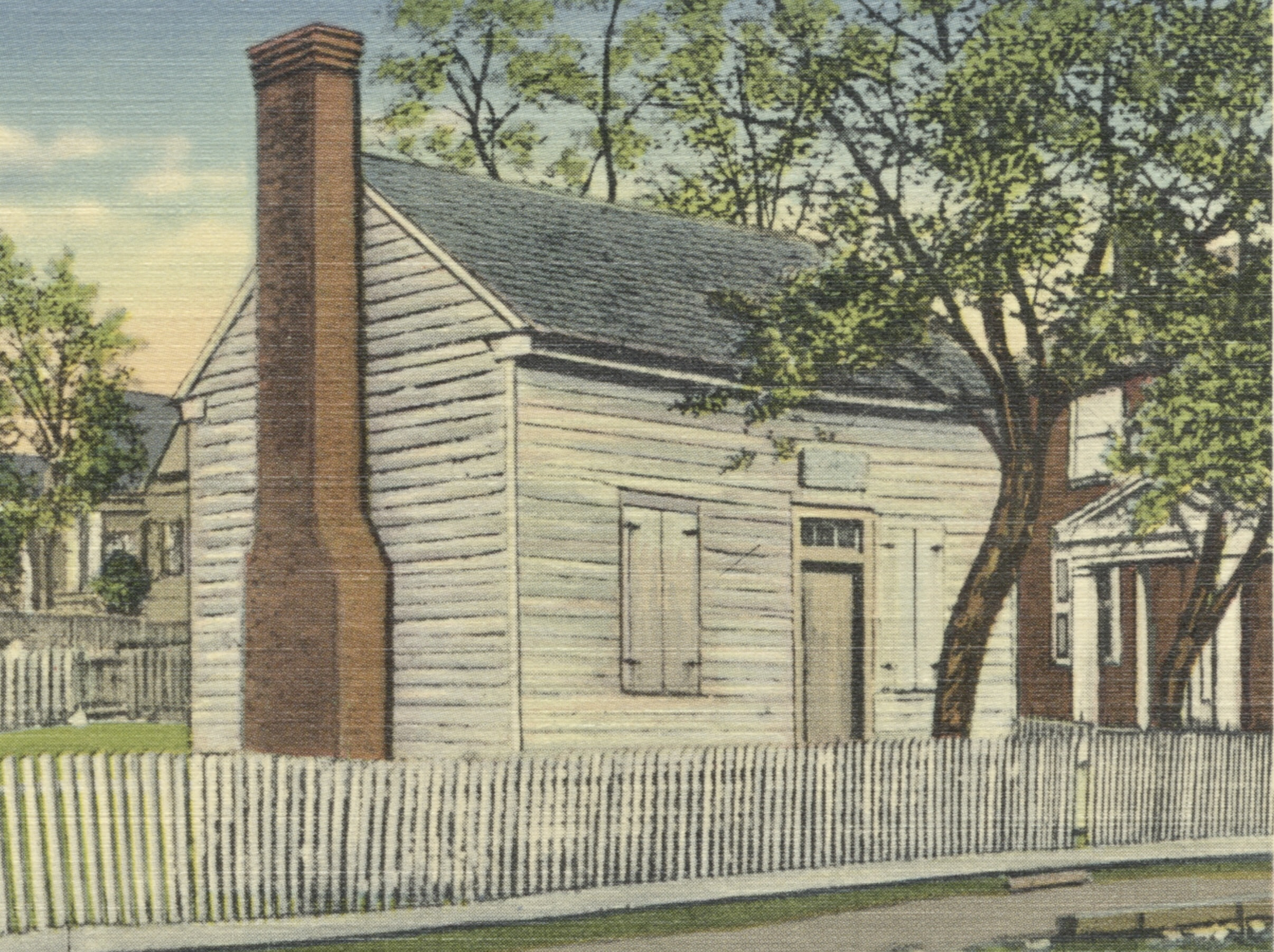
This linen-era postcard image of Andrew Johnson's tailor shop was possibly based on a late 19th-century photograph; circa 1886 it was reported that "some old colored people have a life-time interest in the shop and they live in it"

Dolly Johnson died sometime after July 1887. The National Park Service suggests her death may have occurred between 1890 and 1892. Liz's youngest daughter Dollie Forby was born in May 1888 and seemingly named after her grandmother. An article in the September 1893 issue of Ladies' Home Journal reported that Martha Patterson lived in her parents' former home in Greeneville with her six-year-old granddaughter, her daughter's widower, and an unidentified "servant woman." (Note: Patterson survived until 1901; the home was occupied by Patterson's immediate descendants until 1942.) Per a 1922 newspaper feature on William Andrew Johnson, "The Johnson family, according to the negro, wanted to have [Dolly] buried in the family cemetery, but her relatives objected, as they were old fashioned negroes and were afraid the rest of their race would not understand." Dolly Johnson's burial place is unknown but her daughter Elizabeth Johnson Forby, her daughter Florence Johnson Smith, and her son William Andrew Johnson, were all buried at Knoxville College Colored Cemetery, now called Freedmen's Mission Historic Cemetery at Knoxville College.

== See also ==
- Bibliography of Andrew Johnson
- History of slavery in Tennessee
- Tennessee in the American Civil War
- History of Tennessee § Reconstruction era and disenfranchisement
- African Americans in Tennessee
- Emily Harold – American woman (1820–1872)
- Catharine (Tennessee) – Enslaved mother, b. c. 1835
- Julia Chinn – American enslaved woman married to Vice President Richard Johnson (c. 1790–1833)
- Mary Emmons – Mistress of Vice President Aaron Burr (c. 1760–c. 1832)
- Jefferson–Hemings controversy
