= Florence Johnson Smith =

American housemaid and cook (~1850–1920)

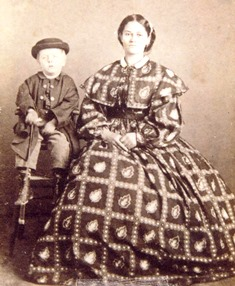
- Andrew Johnson Stover and Florence Johnson, 1860s (Andrew Johnson National Historic Site, U.S. National Park Service)
- Born: Florence Johnson; May , 1850; Greeneville, Tennessee, United States
- Died: September 15, 1920 (aged 70); Knoxville, Tennessee, United States
- Resting place: Knoxville College Cemetery
- Other names: Aunt Florence, Fannie Smith, Mrs. Henry Smith
- Occupations: Housemaid, cook
- Known for: Enslaved by future U.S. President Andrew Johnson, worked in White House
- Spouse: Henry Smith
- Children: Edgar Smith, Andrew Smith, Bonnie Smith, Mabel Smith
- Mother: Dolly Johnson
- Relatives: Elizabeth Johnson Forby (sister); William Andrew Johnson (brother); Samuel Johnson (uncle)

Florence Johnson Smith (May 1850 – September 15, 1920) was a mixed-race woman from Tennessee who was enslaved, from birth until approximately age 13, by Andrew Johnson, later the 17th president of the United States. She worked in service at the Tennessee governor's mansion during the American Civil War, at the White House as a housemaid during Johnson's presidency, and in his home in Greeneville as a cook after he left office. Her mother was Dolly Johnson; the identity of her father remains officially unknown. Since the late 20th century several scholars and popular historians have speculated or insinuated that Andrew Johnson may be Florence's biological father, although there is no evidence that either confirms the relationship or eliminates Johnson as a candidate for paternity. In later life Florence Smith may have been a woman of some financial means as she was remembered at the time of her death as a benefactress who financially supported local African American students pursuing college educations.

== Biography ==
=== Early life ===
Florence Johnson was born in the month of May, most likely in 1850, somewhere in the U.S. state of Tennessee. (Note: Her death certificate listed no birth date but asserted that she was born in "Green, Tn." meaning Greeneville, Tennessee. However, when her brother died in 1943, a white descendant of Andrew Johnson stated that the brother was the only one of Dolly Johnson's children born in Greeneville, suggesting that Florence was born elsewhere, perhaps Nashville, etc.) The father of Florence and her older sister Lucy Elizabeth, called Liz, was never named in any known historical document, and his identity remains officially unknown. Per historian Annette Gordon-Reed, "Dolly, who was described in the census as black, would give birth to three children ... listed as 'mulattoes,' which suggests that they had been fathered by a white man or an extremely light-skinned black man." The childhoods of Dolly Johnson's children are almost entirely undocumented but they are believed to appear, as demographic summaries lacking names, on the 1850 and 1860 U.S. census slave schedules as property of Andrew Johnson. On April 16, 1854, Andrew Johnson wrote a letter to his second-born son Robert Johnson, aged 20, that included this statement: "I have bought a basket and some other little notions for your little brothe[r] and a little chair for Liz and Florence &c." (Note: The little brother is Andrew "Frank" Johnson Jr., born 1852.)

On August 8, 1863, amidst the ongoing American Civil War, military governor of Tennessee Andrew Johnson freed his personal slaves, including Florence. According to Florence's younger brother William Andrew Johnson, "Mrs. Johnson called us all in and said we were free now. She said we were free to go or could stay if we wanted to. We all stayed." After freedom, the black Johnsons stayed with the white Johnsons as paid servants. In 1864 and 1865, when Andrew Johnson was military governor of Tennessee, he "claimed pay toward wages, rations, and clothing for three servants: Henry, Florence, and Elizabeth (Liz)." According to three published obituaries, Florence Johnson worked at the White House as a housemaid during the presidency of Andrew Johnson, his term being from 1865 to 1869. She would have been approximately 15 to 19 years old during the Johnson administration, and it may be during this period that she was photographed beside Andrew Johnson Stover, the youngest of Mary Johnson Stover's three children. In the words of David Warren Bowen, author of Andrew Johnson and the Negro, "The picture shows a handsome young woman of very light color most tastefully dressed in a manner that appears quite expensive and not the sort of attire one would expect of a common servant."

Following the Johnson family's departure from the White House in 1869, Dolly Johnson and her youngest two children shared a home to Greeneville, where they appeared in the U.S. census under their own names for the first time in 1870. Florence is recorded as being literate, a privilege not accorded her mother. Florence Johnson, age 22, is dually enumerated. In addition to being listed in her mother's household, she is enumerated in the household of Andrew Johnson, occupation "Ex Pres, Retired." Her occupation there is "cook." According to William Andrew Johnson, he learned cooking from Florence, who had been formally trained.

From his mother, William Andrew learned much about cooking, but his sister, Florence, who was a maid in the White House, taught him the culinary art after her return from a famous cooking school of that day to which the president sent her.

— Knoxville Journal and Tribune, December 24, 1922

=== Marriage and family ===
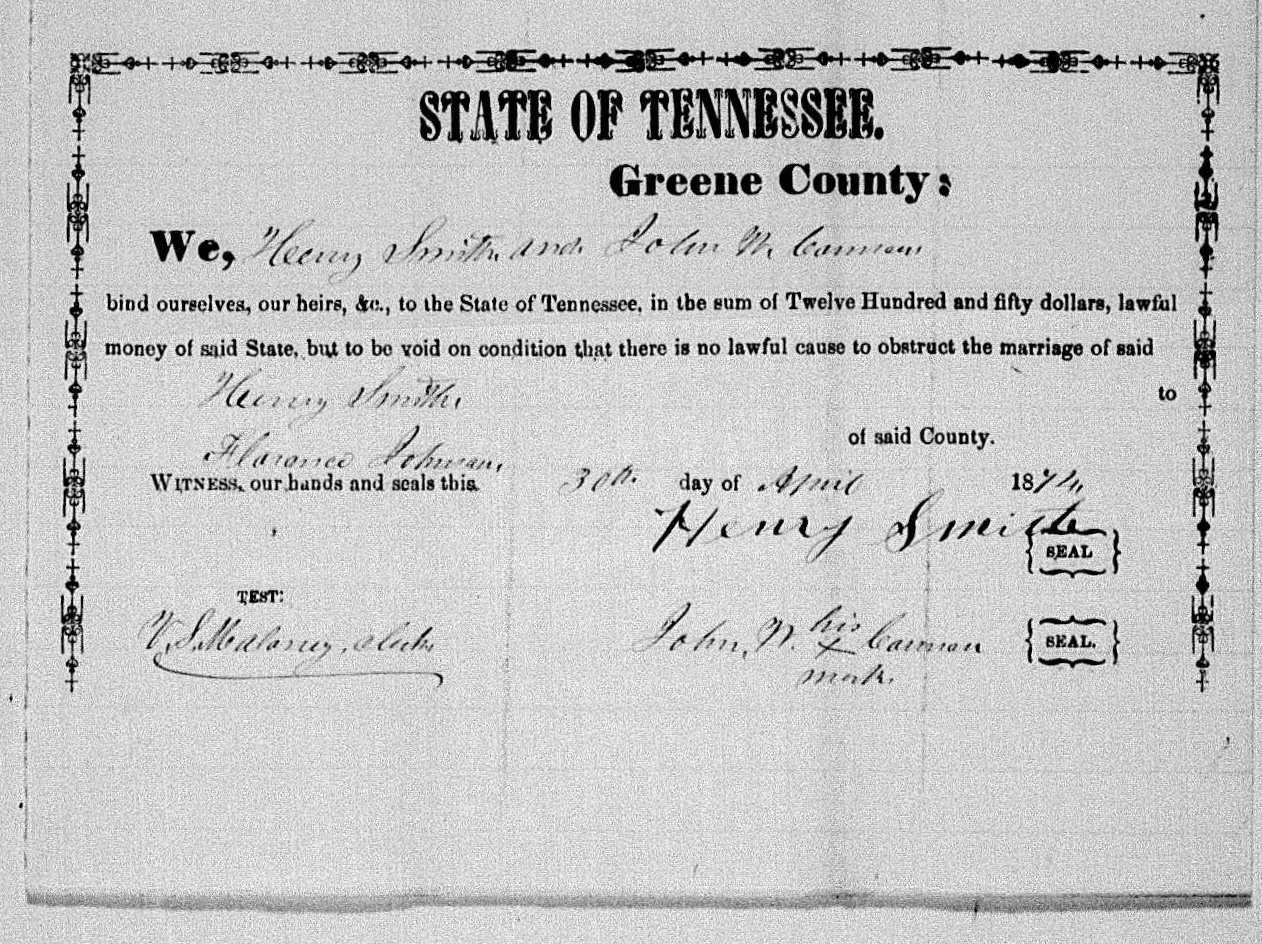
Marriage bond of Henry Smith and Florence Johnson, Greene County, Tennessee, 1874

On April 30, 1874, Florence Johnson married Henry Smith at Greeneville, Tennessee. Smith was a native of Tennessee born about 1847. He was a former 1st Sergeant (the highest rank obtainable by a black man at that time) of Company G of the 1st Regiment, United States Colored Heavy Artillery. The 1st U.S. Colored Heavy Artillery was organized at Knoxville and then stationed in Greeneville from March 1865 to March 1866. Smith was possibly born enslaved as the colored heavy artillery units recruited heavily from the local populations of freed slaves, escaped slaves and contraband. Henry Smith reported that his father was born in Tennessee, and his mother was born in Virginia.

In 1880 the family was living together in Greeneville, and Henry and Florence had become the parents of three children: Edgar, born about 1876, and twins Andrew and Bonnie, born about 1879. Henry Smith was employed as a laborer and Florence was keeping house.

The whereabouts of Florence and the rest of the family between 1880 and 1900 are obscure, however by turn of the 20th century, Florence and Henry were living separately and Florence reported herself as either widowed or divorced. The separation may be explained by a news item published March 1889 in The Tennessean of Nashville, although caution must be exercised in this attribution since the identity of the wife in the report is obscured:

A FAMILY FUSS

Henry Smith Measures His Wife's Length Upon the Ground

Henry Smith, colored, appeared in the docks before Judge Bell of the City Court yesterday morning on charge of assault and battery. He was found guilty and fined $20. The evidence showed that Mr. Smith and Mrs. Smith had passed that stage of wedded bliss where man and wife are all in all to one another. It appeared that they were strolling along in the dusk of evening and that Mr. Smith's mind took a financial turn and he proposed to borrow of Mrs Smith the snug little sum of 50 cents. Mrs. Smith, who had great confidence in her judgment when it came to matters of finance, refused the loan and successfully rebutted all Mr. Smith's arguments as to his solvency. To cut the story short Mr Smith became enraged and struck his wife a blow that laid her prone upon the sidewalk. Hence the result as told.

— The Tennessean, March 20, 1889

=== Later life ===
At the time of the June 1900 U.S. census, Florence Smith lived at the corner of McGhee and Dora, in Knoxville, Tennessee. She shared her home with her son Andrew Smith, age 21, who worked as a bellhop at a hotel, and her daughter Mabel Smith, who was born July 1882 and was attending school. Florence claimed to be widowed. Smith's obituaries had it that she permanently moved from Greeneville to Knoxville around 1902. Ten years later, at the time of the 1910 census, Florence Smith still lived on McGhee Street; the other members of her household were her daughter Mabel and her brother William Johnson, who worked as a cook at a hotel. Florence Johnson Smith told the census enumerator that she was divorced and that she was the mother of four children, three of whom were still living, suggesting that Bonnie Smith had died sometime prior.

Henry and Florence (Johnson) Smith's son Andrew Smith died on October 18, 1910, at age 27. The cause of death was pulmonary tuberculosis and he was buried in Knoxville College Cemetery. Henry and Florence Smith's daughter Mabel Smith died September 17, 1913, at age 27. Mabel Smith, a resident of 300 McGhee, had been working as a schoolteacher. The cause of death was some kind of pulmonary illness. Mabel Smith was buried at Knoxville College Cemetery.

At the time of the 1920 federal census, Florence Smith shared her household with her oldest, and only surviving, child, Edgar Smith. She remained in the rented home at Dora and McGhee where she had lived for many years. Edgar Smith, age 40 and unmarried, worked as a cook for a railroad.

Florence Johnson Smith died at age 70 in Knoxville on September 15, 1920, of "dropsy following cardiac and renal complications." She was buried five days later at Knoxville College Cemetery, presumably in close proximity to her children. Several regional newspapers published news items about her death, referencing her association with Andrew Johnson and her time in the White House.

She was a woman who made the most of her opportunities, and with the funds at her disposal helped many worthy young persons of her race in their efforts to go through college. Her home was a mecca for visitors, many well known Knoxville people brought their out-of-town visitors there to hear the wonderful tales of the old South "Aunt-Florence" could relate.

— Knoxville Journal and Tribune, September 16, 1920

== Henry Smith ==
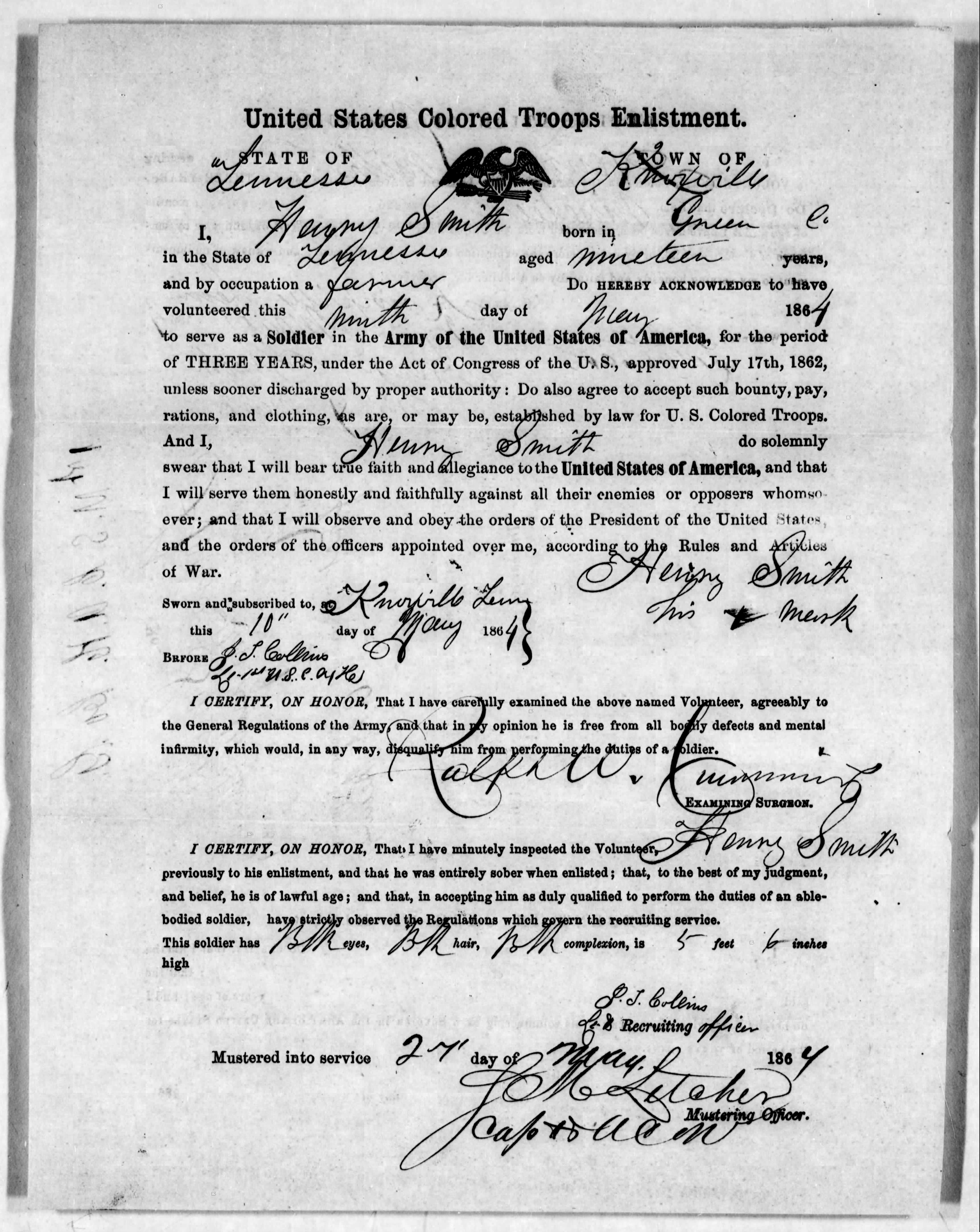
Henry Smith, United States Colored Troops enlistment, May 27, 1864

Despite the fact that Florence Smith sometimes claimed to be a widow, her one-time husband Henry Smith actually outlived her by four years. In 1903 he registered with the newly established National Home for Disabled Volunteer Soldiers in Johnson City, Tennessee. He was said to suffer from rheumatism and a chronic cough he acquired in Greeneville in 1888. He was living in or near the home in 1910, when he reported to census enumerators that he had been twice married. He shared a household with 18-year-old Bessie Cannon, a granddaughter. (Note: The surname Cannon also appears as surety on Henry and Florence's 1874 marriage bond; sureties, or bondsmen, were often relatives of the bride and groom.) In 1920, Smith worked as a servant in the quartermaster's storehouse of the Johnson City Soldiers' Home. Henry Smith died June 19, 1924, and was buried June 21 in Section J Row 16 Site 5 of Mountain Home National Cemetery.

== Edgar Smith ==
Florence was predeceased by all her children except for Edgar Allen Smith, born October 29, 1875. When he registered for the World War I draft in 1918, he reported that he worked as a chef in a railroad dining car based out of Chattanooga. Circa 1925, Edgar Smith was a widowed lodger living in Davenport, Iowa. Edgar Smith's circumstances and fate after 1925 are unknown.

== Additional images ==
Florence Johnson Smith Family Primary Sources
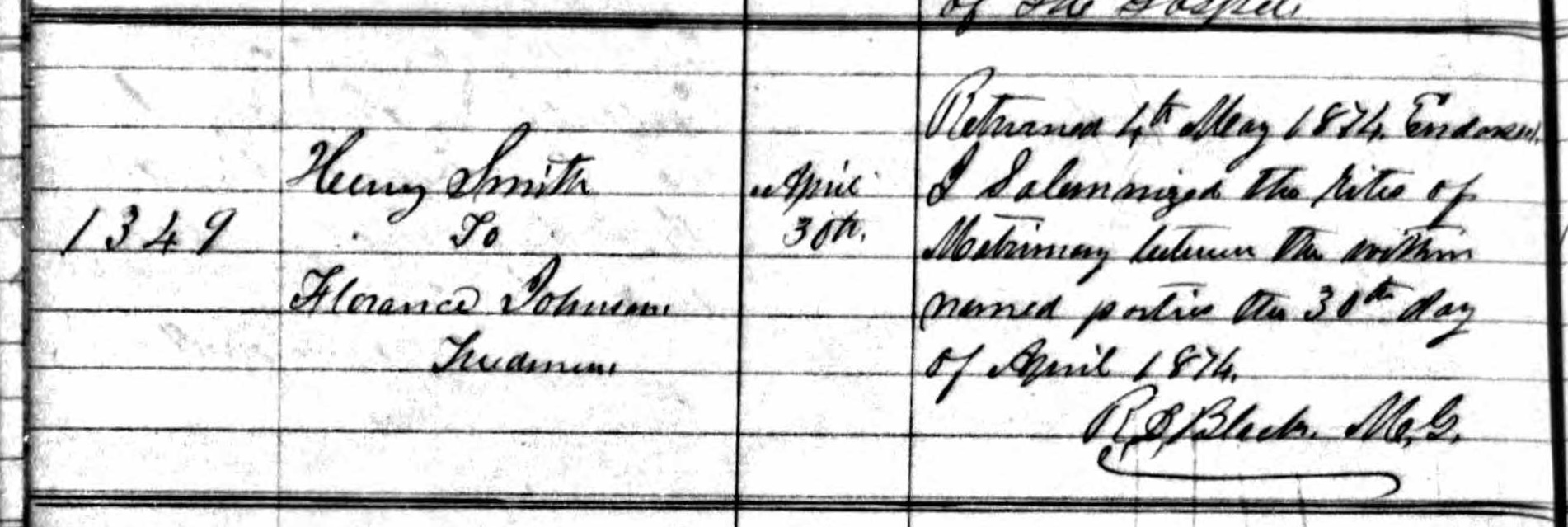
Likely marriage record of Florence Johnson; the note below their names reads Freedmen

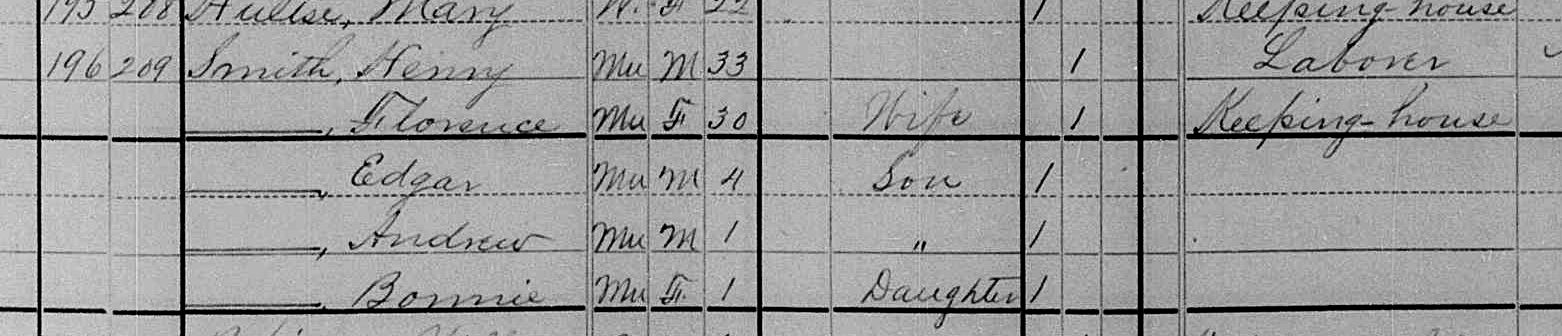
U.S. federal census of Greeneville, Tennessee, enumerated, June 10, 1880

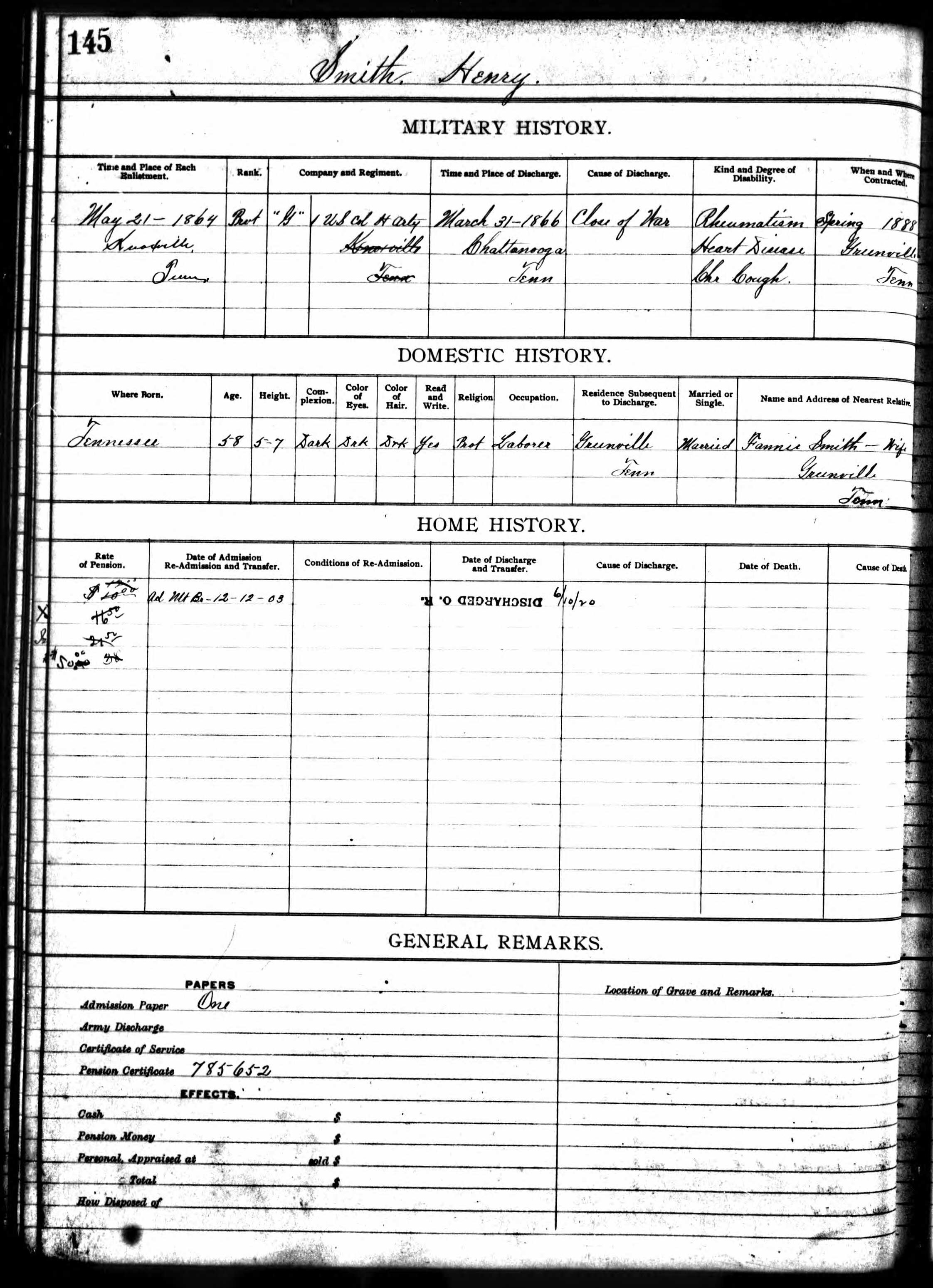
Henry Smith in Register of Johnson City TN Soldiers Home, 1903

== See also ==
- List of presidents of the United States who owned slaves
- List of vice presidents of the United States who owned slaves
- List of children of presidents of the United States
- Greeneville Historic District (Greeneville, Tennessee)
- African Americans in Tennessee § History
- Bibliography of Andrew Johnson
- "I, Too" (1927 poem by Langston Hughes)
- Clotel; or, The President's Daughter: A Narrative of Slave Life in the United States (1853) by William Wells Brown
