= Andrew Johnson and slavery =

Aspect of U.S. history

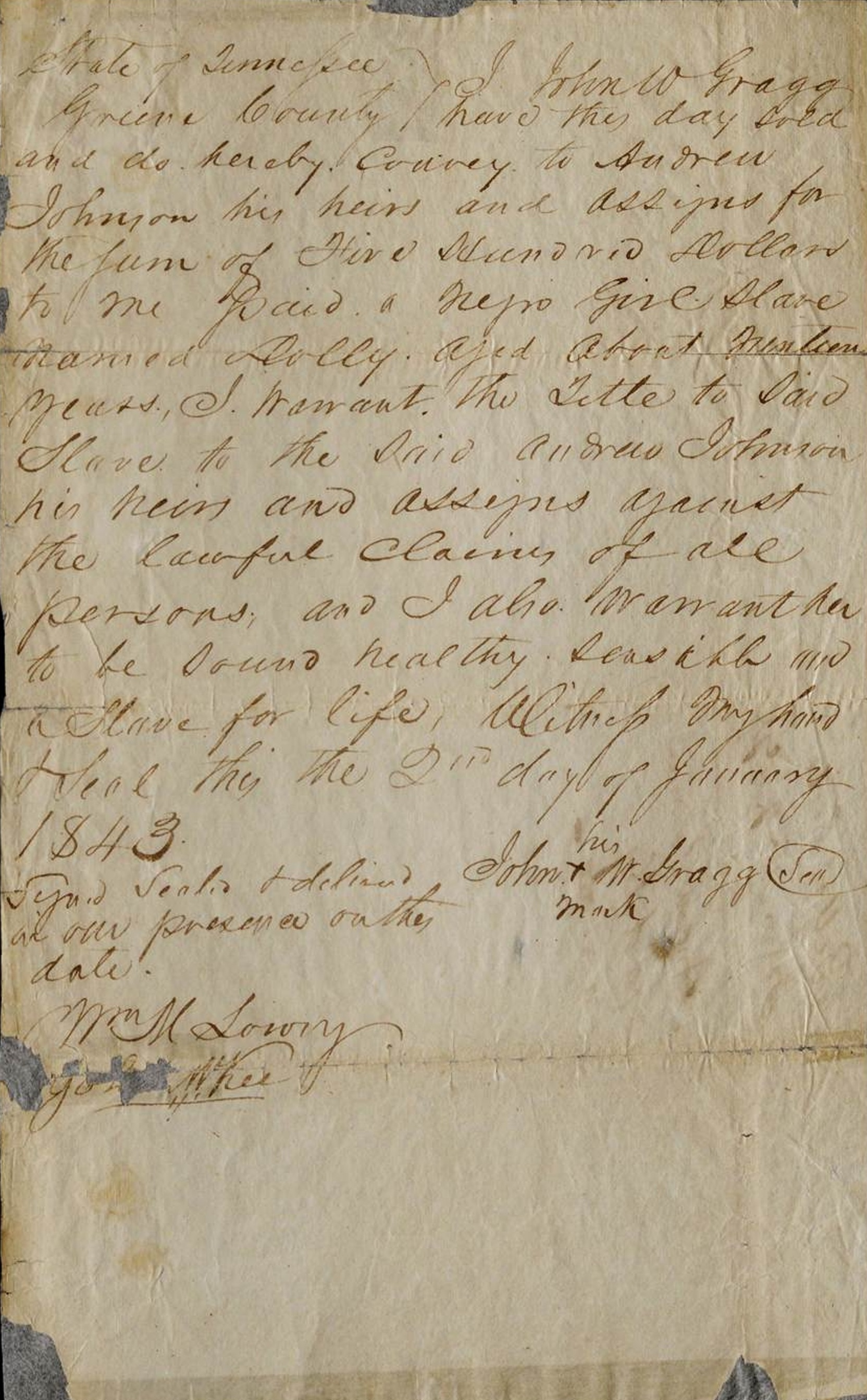
The bill of sale for Andrew Johnson's purchase of Dolly Johnson

Andrew Johnson, who became the 17th U.S. president following the assassination of Abraham Lincoln, was one of the last presidents to personally own slaves. (Note: Ulysses S. Grant married into slave ownership, briefly.) Johnson also oversaw the first years of the Reconstruction era as the head of the executive branch of the U.S. government. This professional obligation clashed with Johnson's long-held personal resentments: "Johnson's attitudes showed much consistency. All of his life he held deep-seated Jacksonian convictions along with prejudices against blacks, sectionalists, and the wealthy." Johnson's engagement with Southern Unionism and Abraham Lincoln is summarized by his statement, "Damn the negroes; I am fighting these traitorous aristocrats, their masters!"

According to Reconstruction historian Manisha Sinha, Johnson is remembered today for making white supremacy the overriding principle of his presidency through "his obdurate opposition to Reconstruction, the project to establish an interracial democracy in the United States after the destruction of slavery. He wanted to prevent, as he put it, the 'Africanization' of the country. Under the guise of strict constructionism, states' rights and opposition to big government, previously deployed by Southern slaveholders to defend slavery, Johnson vetoed all federal laws intended to protect former slaves from racial terror and from the Black Codes passed in the old Confederate states. This reduced African-Americans to a state of semi-servitude. Johnson peddled the racist myth that Southern whites were victimized by black emancipation and citizenship, which became an article of faith among Lost Cause proponents in the postwar South." In 1935, W. E. B. DuBois included an essay called "Transubstantiation of a Poor White" in his book Black Reconstruction in America. The topic was Johnson's Presidential Reconstruction, about which DuBois wrote: "Andrew Johnson could not include Negroes in any conceivable democracy. He tried to, but as a poor white, steeped in the limitations, prejudices, and ambitions of his social class, he could not; and this is the key to his career...For [the future of the] Negroes...he had nothing...except the bare possibility that, if given freedom, they might continue to exist and not die out."

== Personal ownership of slaves ==
Andrew Johnson typically said he owned between eight and 10 slaves, although the exact number is "surprisingly difficult to determine." Eight people enslaved by Johnson are listed below; Liz, Florence, and William Johnson were born enslaved. Additional people enslaved by Johnson may be Sam Johnson's wife Margaret and their first three children, Dora, Robert, and Hattie, although their inclusion from a legal standpoint is entirely speculative, as the documentary record of Johnson's slave holdings is scant. Other possible candidates are an unnamed child who may have been born to Dolly between Florence and William Andrew but who died young, and possibly the wife of Henry Brown.

When meeting with Frederick Douglass and other African-American leaders about the prospects for black male suffrage, Andrew Johnson's counterargument to black empowerment was a feigned victimhood. He told the group of visitors: "'I might say, however, that practically, so far as my connection with slaves has gone, I have been their slave instead of their being mine. Some have even followed me here, while others are occupying and enjoying my property with my consent.'" Similarly, in March 1869, shortly after the end of his term in the White House, a newspaperman from Cincinnati found the ex-president at his home in Greeneville and conducted an interview. When asked about slavery, Johnson's reply was rich in me, my, and I statements, as was typical for him: "I never bought but two or three slaves in my life, and I never sold one. The fact is [laughs] I was always more of a slave than any I owned. Slavery existed here among us, and those that I bought I bought because they wanted me to." The most charitable possible interpretation of this statement, which implies a number of shocking presumptions, is that on some level Johnson understood that his slaves had substantially more character than he himself, a man who has been described as "all in all one of the most unlovable characters in U.S. presidential history," and "in some respects...the most pitiful figure of American history. A man who, despite great power and great ideas, became a puppet, played upon by mighty fingers and selfish, subtle minds; groping, self-made, unlettered and alone; drunk, not so much with liquor, as with the heady wine of sudden and accidental success."

Image	Name	Slave name	Purchase date	Purchase price	Freedom date	Born	Died	Family	Notes
	Sam Johnson	Sam	1842-11-29	US$549 (equivalent to $18,316 in 2025)	1863-08-08	1835	after 1883	Married, children	Emancipation Day traditions
	Dolly Johnson	Dolly	1843-01-02	US$500 (equivalent to $17,277 in 2025)	1863-08-08	1825–1830 (est.)	after 1886	Married, children	Emancipation Day traditions
	Elizabeth Johnson Forby	Liz		Born enslaved under U.S. law because Johnson owned her mother	1863-08-08	1846-03	1905-10-03	Married, children	
	Florence Johnson Smith	Florence		Born enslaved under U.S. law because Johnson owned her mother	1863-08-08	1850-05	1920-09-20	Married, children; she was survived by her son Edgar Smith;	Worked as a maid at the White House during Johnson's presidency; died at Knoxville
	William Andrew Johnson	William Andrew		Born enslaved under U.S. law because Johnson owned her mother	1863-08-08	1858	1943	No spouse, no children	
	Henry Brown		Unknown, Henry is implied or presumed to have been a former slave, and has likely been historically conflated with Henry Johnson; his exact legal status before the Civil War is unknown			Unknown	1866-10-25	Married	Worked at the White House during Andrew Johnson's presidency, and died there of cholera; had previously been a family servant for a long time
	Henry Johnson		1857-05-06	US$1,050 (equivalent to $36,281 in 2025)	1863-08-08	about 1844	1890	Unknown	Worked at the White House during Andrew Johnson's presidency, later worked at the post office; died at Knoxville
		Bill	Unknown	Unknown	1863-08-08			Married, children	Robert W. Winston, an early 20th century biographer, describes Bill as a "manservant" whose wife worked as the Johnson family cook (Note: Anecdotes attributed to Bill bear a distinct resemblance to later quotes from William Andrew Johnson.)

== Paternity of Dolly Johnson's children ==
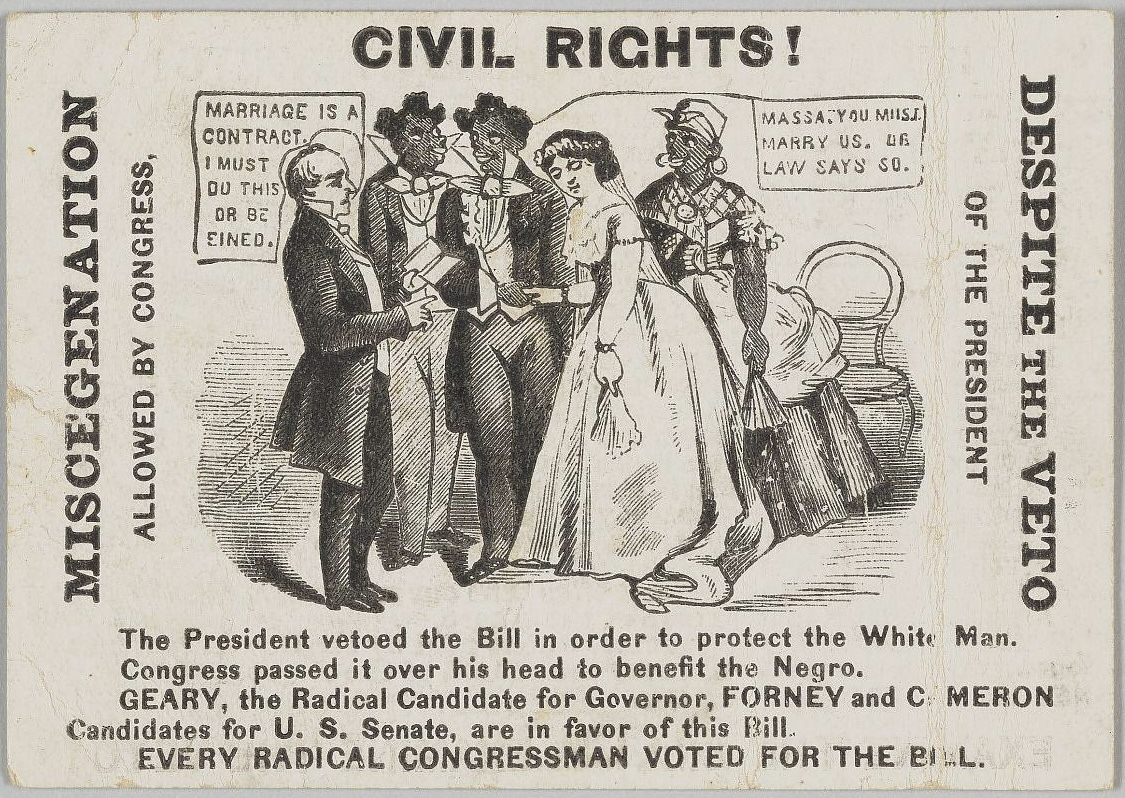
This political cartoon casts Johnson's veto in a favorable light, arguing that extending civil rights to newly emancipated slaves would unfairly impose fines on whites for following their racist belief systems and encourage black men to carry off all the white women, which was a dread fear of white males and would eventually result in anti-miscegenation laws in the United States (National Museum of African American History and Culture)

Since the late 20th century historians have begun to speculate or insinuate that Andrew Johnson may have been the father of two, if not all three, of Dolly Johnson's children. Dolly was enslaved by Johnson from 1843 until 1863. Robert Johnson, Andrew Johnson's second-born son, was listed as father on William Andrew Johnson's death certificate in 1943. There is no concrete evidence either proving or disproving paternity, and there have been no suggested alternate candidates over the last 175 years. The National Park Service, which operates the Andrew Johnson National Historic Site, notes "questionable paternity," and dedicates a page on their website to "Dolly's Children" but goes no further. The father of Dolly Johnson's children could have been "anybody in Greeneville" and yet the relationship between the white and black Johnsons led "Tennessee whites to speculate that Andrew Johnson maintained a 'colored concubine.'" Hints that the black Johnsons and the white Johnsons had an unusually close relationship include various combinations of them sharing households for years/decades after slavery ended, multiple cases of duplicated names amongst the children and grandchildren, Dolly being the recipient of furniture and household goods from the family, the inclusion of William Andrew Johnson in family-organized events honoring Johnson well into the mid-20th century, an account of Andrew Johnson paying for Florence to go to cooking school, the fact that Mary left Liz property in her will, and the fact that after Johnson died intestate his widow Eliza made that certain that Dolly could keep her house, etc.

Interestingly, writes historian Annette Gordon-Reed:

[Johnson] fixated on the 'problem' of interracial sex. In fact, he believed that slavery promoted it because it brought blacks and whites into such intimate and daily contact with one another. In the days when the writing was on the wall, and he knew that slavery would die at the hands of the Civil War, Johnson adopted an antislavery stance and began to denounce the institution. All his speeches on the subject 'dwell almost obsessively on racial miscegenation as the institution's main evil.'...the slaveholding Johnson may have used all this hard talk against racial mixture as a cover for his own circumstances. He would not have been the first, or the last, southern white man to travel this tortured psychological route."

If Johnson did have a shadow family with Dolly while hypocritically upholding a race-based caste system, it would have put him in the company of U.S. President Thomas Jefferson, Supreme Court Justice John Catron, U.S. Senator James Henry Hammond, and in the 20th century, U.S. Senator Strom Thurmond. Johnson's possibly having fathered several multiracial children would have been part of a widespread "racial and sexual double standard...in the slaveholding states [that] gave elite white men a free pass for their sexual relationships with black women, as long as the men neither flaunted nor legitimated such unions." American national leaders in less-hypocritical interracial relationships included U.S. Vice President Richard Mentor Johnson and most likely Thaddeus Stevens (chair of the House Ways and Means committee and one of President Johnson's fiercest Congressional opponents). Andrew Johnson lectured newly emancipated blacks on the necessity of avoiding "licentiousness" and the importance of learning the "laws of marriage," but, hypocritically, he himself may not have followed those laws. In addition to suspicions about his sexual exploitation of Dolly, he was accused twice in separate sworn testimonies of being familiar with sex workers; in 1872, he was accused of seducing his neighbor's wife; and he was posthumously described as the source of a "canker" in his wife's heart "fed or created, as the gossips have said, by the marital infidelity of her graceless lord." In 1856 a Knoxville newspaper argued, "Honor conferred upon him is like a jewel put into the nose of a hog—it can escape no possible defilement."

Margaret Johnson Patterson Bartlett told interviewers about her father selectively burning letters prior to donating Andrew Johnson's correspondence to the Library of Congress. Bartlett commented, "...things that he thought was nobody's business, he'd burn them. And I'm glad he did. And here are some of these historians who are grabbers and like to feature that stuff – the fire has consumed them! And I'm glad of it. It's family. Private!" Researchers can only speculate but not know that "perhaps intimate letters between family members revealed the identity(ies) of the father of Dolly’s offspring."

== Emancipation Day ==
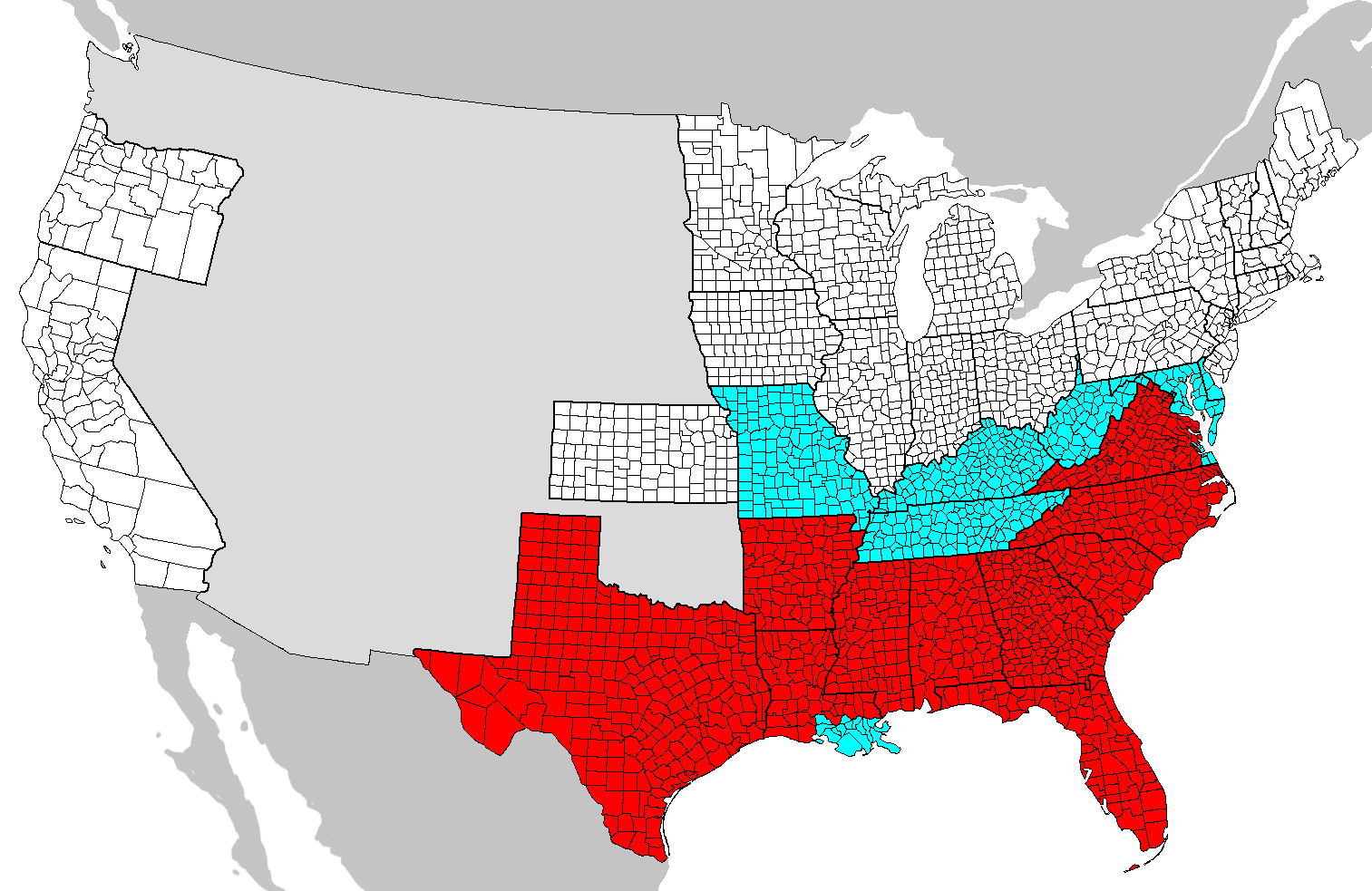
Areas colored in teal were exempted from the effect of Lincoln's Emancipation Proclamation, which only applied to areas considered to be in effective rebellion against the U.S. government

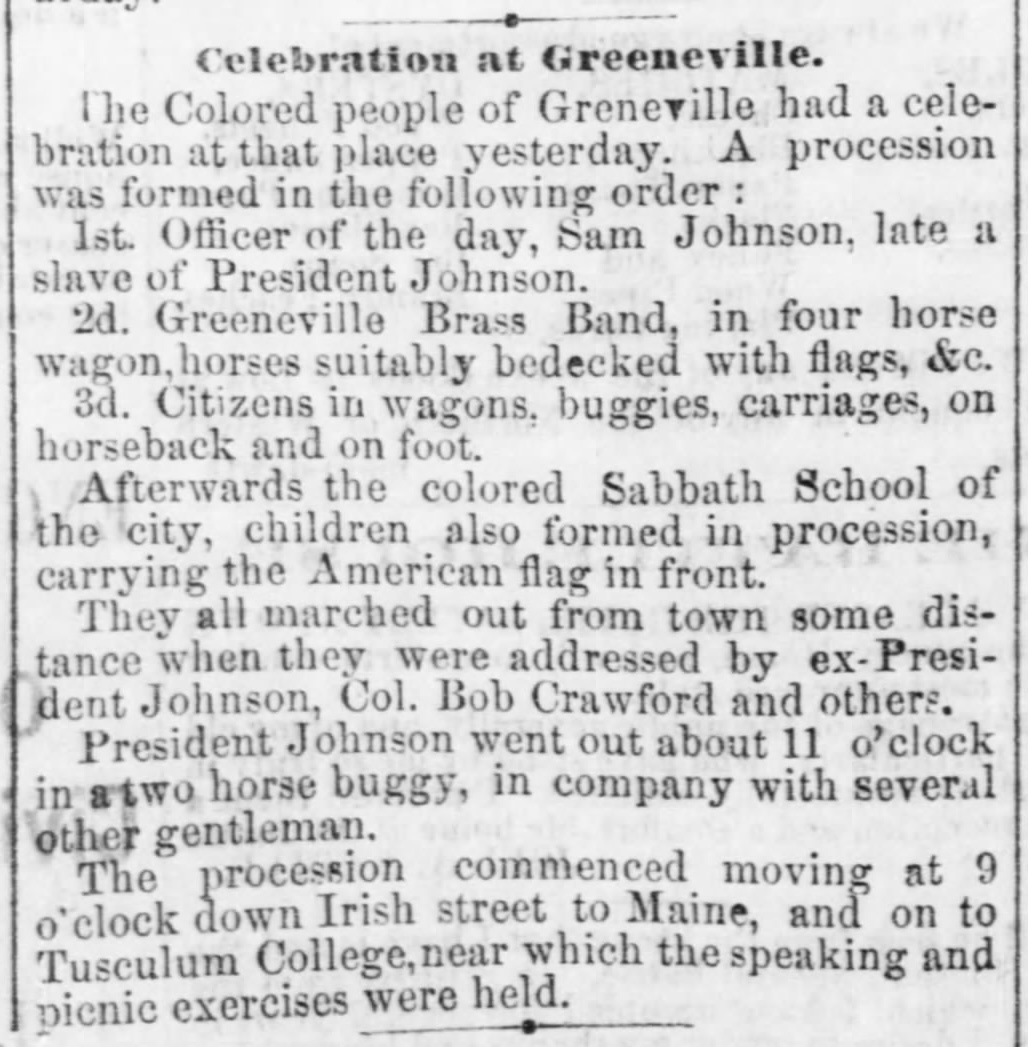
"Celebration at Greeneville" (Knoxville Daily Chronicle, August 9, 1871)

According to family and historical records, Andrew Johnson freed his personal slaves on August 8, 1863, a date that falls between Abraham Lincoln's January 1863 Emancipation Proclamation, from which Tennessee was exempted, and mass emancipation in Tennessee which occurred on October 24, 1864, by declaration of military governor Johnson. A new Tennessee constitution abolished slavery in the state as of February 22, 1865. The Thirteenth Amendment of the United States Constitution was ratified in December 1865. According to University of Virginia history professor Elizabeth Varon, "Fearing that emancipation by federal edict would alienate Tennessee's slaveholding Unionists, Johnson urged that the state be exempted from the Emancipation Proclamation, so he could promote the issue from the inside: in August 1863, Johnson freed his own slaves, seeking to set an example for his fellow Tennesseans."

The August 8 date eventually became known as Freedom Day in Tennessee, and was also eventually celebrated in some neighboring communities in Kentucky, Missouri, and southern Illinois. Andrew Johnson himself attended a Freedom Day celebration organized by Sam Johnson in 1871. For the many decades between emancipation and desegregation, the annual August 8 picnic was the only day of the year that blacks were allowed to be in Knoxville's Chilhowee Park. In 1938, William Andrew Johnson, then 80 years old, spoke at a Tennessee Emancipation Day celebration at Chilhowee Park.

Johnson is one of the last surviving slaves in this section. January 1 was designated as Emancipation day but Andrew Johnson freed his slaves August 8 and Negroes of East Tennessee have always observed that date as Emancipation day. The celebration this year has been changed to August 9 because August 8 is on Sunday.

— The Knoxville Journal, August 8, 1938

== From Moses to Pharaoh ==
Prior to the summer of 1863, Johnson had staunchly opposed general emancipation, but beginning in August of that year, he made a sharp heel-turn in favor of freeing the slaves. Historians find that "his opinion changed with little warning. Flattery by Northern politicians during a tour of Northern states may have swayed him; loyalty to Lincoln's war policy and ambitions to serve on a presidential ticket in 1864 assuredly influenced him as well."

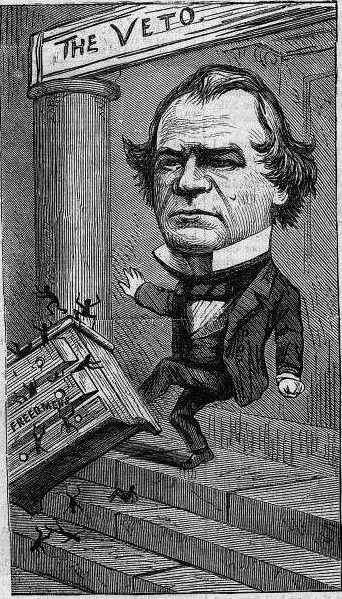
Andrew Johnson vetoed a bill extending funding for the Freedmen's Bureau (editorial cartoon by Thomas Nast, Harper's Weekly, April 14, 1866)

Andrew Johnson made what is remembered as the Moses speech, on October 24, 1864, in Nashville, Tennessee, when he was military governor of Tennessee and a candidate for vice president on the Lincoln Unionist ticket. "Before an audience of ten thousand colored men...amidst cheers which shook the sky," Johnson proclaimed that he would act for their benefit and advancement as a race now that the slaves of the United States had been emancipated.

I will indeed be your Moses, and lead you through the Red Sea of war and bondage, to a fairer future of liberty and peace. I speak, too, as a citizen of Tennessee. I am here on my own soil, and here I mean to stay and fight this great battle of truth and justice to a triumphant end. Rebellion and slavery shall, by God's good help, no longer pollute our State. Loyal men, whether white or black, shall alone control her destinies: and when this strife in which we are all engaged is past, I trust, I know, we shall have a better state of things, and shall all rejoice that honest labor reaps the fruit of its own industry, and that every man has a fair chance in the race of life.

— Andrew Johnson

Johnson refers to the Biblical figure Moses from the Book of Exodus, who led the enslaved Jews of ancient Egypt out of bondage with the aid of God, who parted the Red Sea so that they might pass, and then released the waters upon their pursuers.

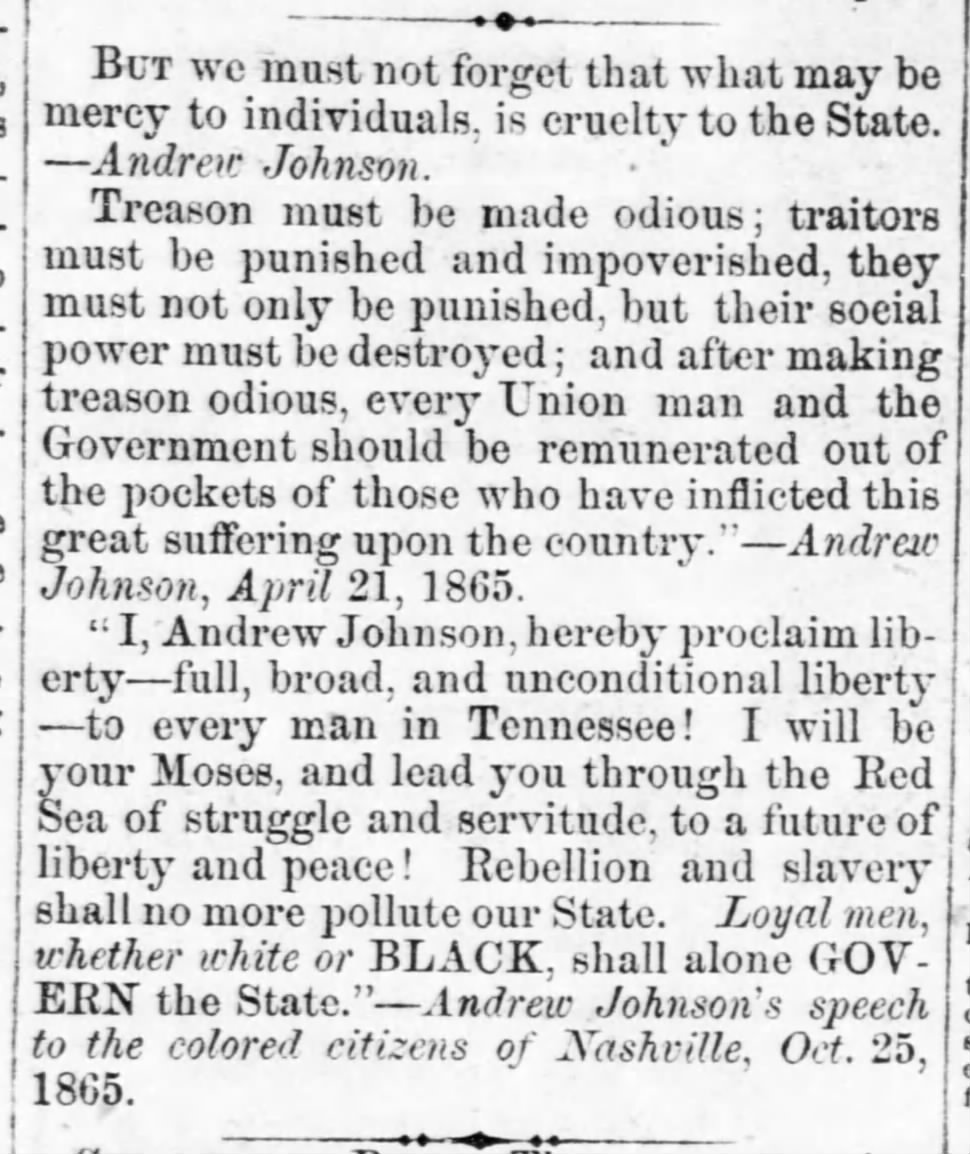
Brownlow's Knoxville Whig resurfaced some of Johnson's past vows on July 4, 1866

Johnson betrayed those who trusted in this campaign promise. As a 1989 book review put it, "Nowhere was Johnson's duplicitous nature more cruelly evident than on questions of race." Per historian Robert S. Levine, "...Johnson worked to undermine the Freedmen's Bureau, to dismantle other Reconstruction initiatives, and to prevent African Americans from attaining equal rights through federal legislation." The betrayal, which contributed to the failure of Reconstruction and another 100 years of racial oppression, continues to be a central focus of historians, but was recognized and criticized in his own time. Johnson's turn from staunch Unionist to Confederate apologist, and his centrality to the diminishment of the goals of Reconstruction, was also gratefully lauded by his fellow white supremacists of the legacy South:

To show the great change effected in Mr. Johnson, no further proof is needed than extracts from Southern papers. The Memphis Argus, one of the most uncompromising rebel sheets published, said in 1862:

"We should to like to see Andrew Johnson's lying tongue torn from his foul mouth, and his miserable carcass thrown to the dogs, or hung on a gibbet as high as Haman to feed the carrion buzzards."

The same paper, edited by the same man, says in 1866:

"The iron firmness, the undismayed soul of a single man (Andrew Johnson) is all that stands between us and the fatal vortex of anarchy and resultant despotism which has engulphed the lives and fortunes of many millions before us.—Let us rally to the side of that man, determined to save or perish with the Republic."

In a report about Johnson's supposed tears over superficial gestures of national comity at the pro-Johnson 1866 National Union Convention in Philadelphia: "There is good reason to believe, that when Miss Columbia, in imitation of Miss Pharaoh, fished among the bulrushes and slimy waters of Southern plebeianism for a little Moses, she slung out a young crocodile instead. He is a crocodile by nature, although he calls himself Moses. He craunches and gulps down whatever stands in his way, without any signs of mercy, yet is always prepared to shed tears to order." The image that Johnson provided of himself-as-Moses was sufficiently rich that it continues to be applied with grim irony to present day.

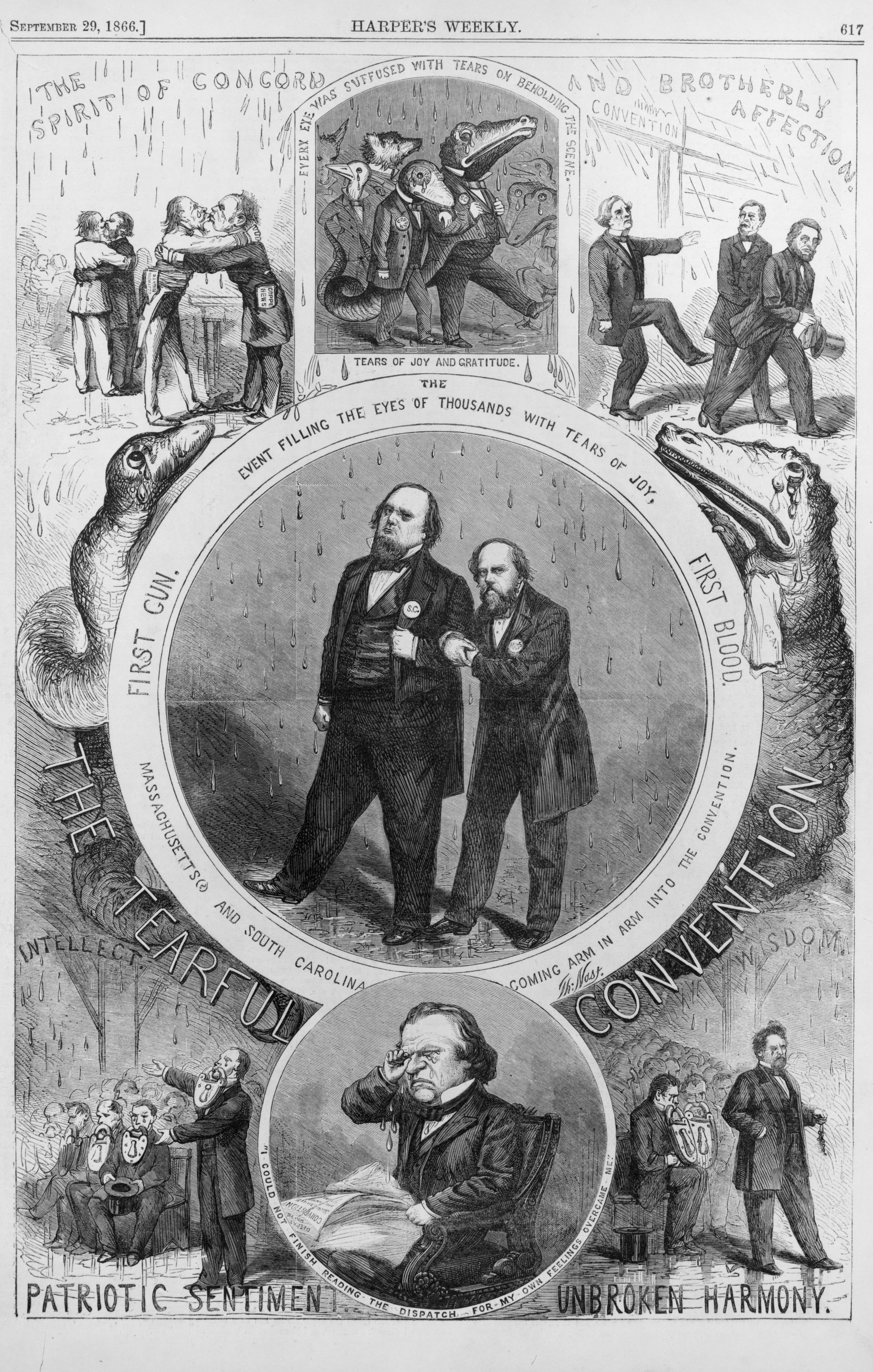
Thomas Nast depicted the supposed crocodile tears of "Moses" in this cartoon about the 1866 National Union Convention in Philadelphia.

Congressmen, including U.S. Senator Sumner, referenced the Moses speech during the Andrew Johnson impeachment hearings:

Andrew Johnson is the impersonation of the tyrannical slave power. In him it lives again. He is the lineal successor of John C. Calhoun and Jefferson Davis; and he gathers about him the same supporters. Original partisans of slavery north and south; habitual compromisers of great principles; maligners of the Declaration of Independence; politicians without heart; lawyers, for whom a technicality is everything, and a promiscuous company who at every stage of the battle have set their faces against equal rights; these are his allies. It is the old troop of slavery, with a few recruits, ready as of old for violence...With the President at their head, they are now entrenched in the Executive Mansion. Not to dislodge them is to leave the country a prey to one of the most hateful tyrannies of history...Not a month, not a week, not day should be lost. The safety of the Republic requires action at once. The lives of innocent men must be rescued from sacrifice. I would not in this judgment depart from that moderation which belongs to the occasion; but God forbid that, when called to deal with so great an offender, should affect a coldness which I cannot feel. Slavery has been our worst enemy, assailing all, murdering our children, filling our homes with mourning, and darkening the land with tragedy; and now it rears its crest anew, with Andrew Johnson as its representative. Through him assumes once more to rule the Republic and to impose its cruel law. The enormity of his conduct is aggravated by his bare faced treachery. He once declared himself the Moses of the colored race. Behold him now the Pharaoh.

— U.S. Senator Charles Sumner (R-Massachusetts), written statement regarding impeachment vote

== Andrew Johnson and civil rights ==
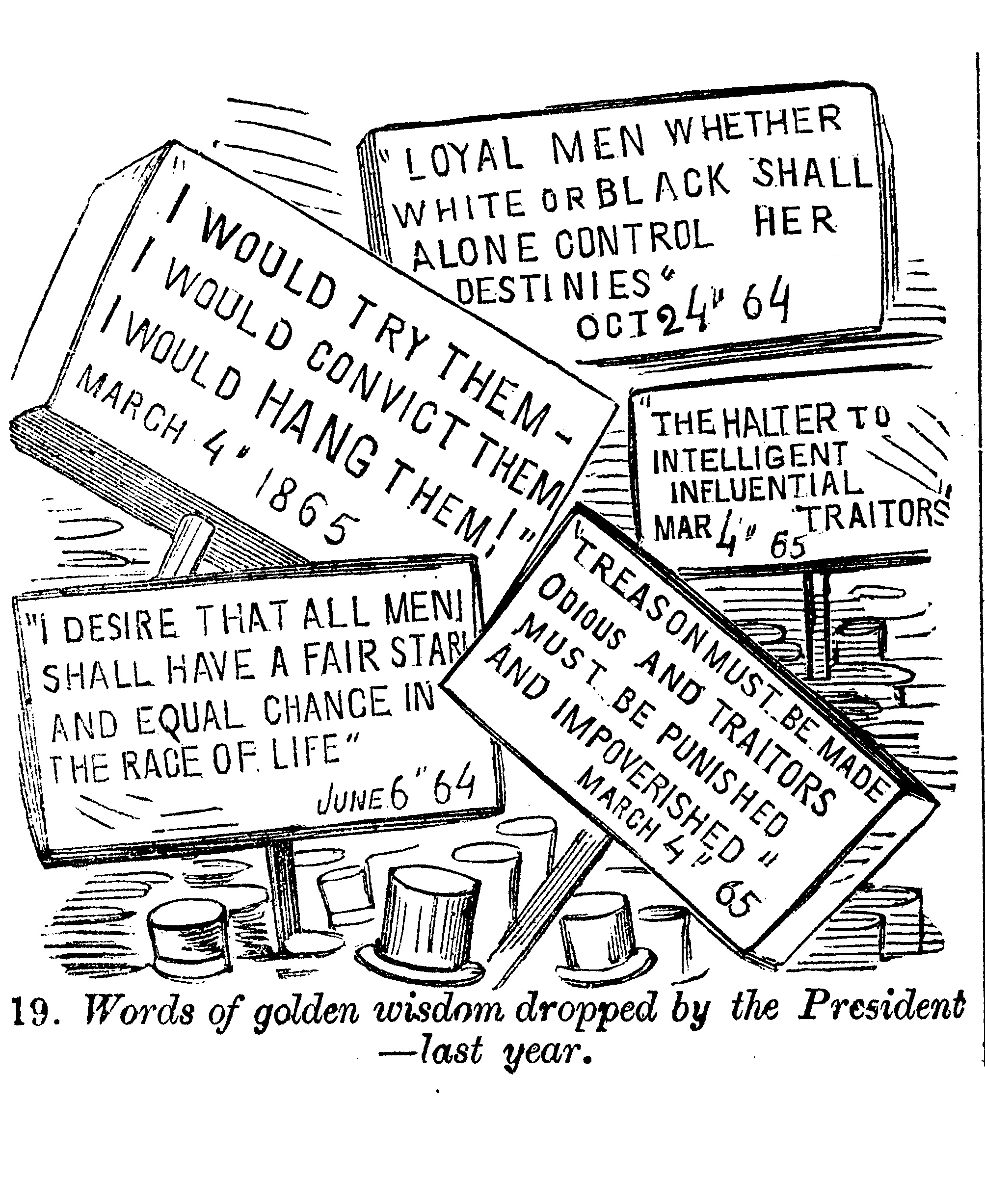
Illustration from David Ross Locke's book about Johnson's 1866 presidential trip

Johnson vetoed several pieces of Congressional legislation that were designed to improve the humanitarian conditions of recently emancipated slaves and/or provide black men with rights that had previously been held only by white men. Johnson would typically "claim that the future status of freed people was not an issue of racism, but an issue of constitutionality." He thus opposed almost all aspects of Congressional Reconstruction, including the Fourteenth Amendment. He argued that improvements in the status of black Americans would only be legitimate if passed on the state, rather than federal level, but he also vetoed the D.C. Franchise Bill, and the District of Columbia is constitutionally defined as the jurisdiction of no state but solely of the U.S. Congress. In American Heritage magazine, historian David Herbert Donald retold a colorful story about Johnson's use of whataboutism in discussions with Sumner about the necessity of the Freedmen's Bureau:

The Senator was depressed by Johnson's 'prejudice, ignorance, and perversity' on the Negro suffrage issue. Far from listening amiably to Sumner's argument that the South was still torn by violence and not yet ready for readmission, Johnson attacked him with cheap analogies. 'Are there no murders in Massachusetts?' the President asked.

'Unhappily yes,' Sumner replied, 'sometimes.'

'Are there no assaults in Boston? Do not men there sometimes knock each other down, so that the police is obliged to interfere?'

'Unhappily yes.'

'Would you consent that Massachusetts, on this account, should be excluded from Congress?' Johnson triumphantly queried. In the excitement of the argument, the President unconsciously used Sumner's hat, which the Senator had placed on the floor beside his chair, as a spittoon!

Andrew Johnson presidential vetoes (partial list)
Veto date	Bill	
February 19, 1866	Freedmen's Bureau Bill	During his Swing Around the Circle Tour he complained about "the cost of the Freedmen's Bureau and of re-enslavement of the Negro by its agents"
March 27, 1866	Civil Rights Bill	
July 16, 1866	Freedmen's Bureau Bill	
January 5, 1867	District of Columbia Suffrage Act	
March 2, 1867	First Military Reconstruction Act (see Reconstruction Acts)	
March 23, 1867	Second Military Reconstruction Act	
July 19, 1867	Third Military Reconstruction Act	
July 25, 1868	Freedmen's Bureau Bill	

== Previous condition of servitude ==
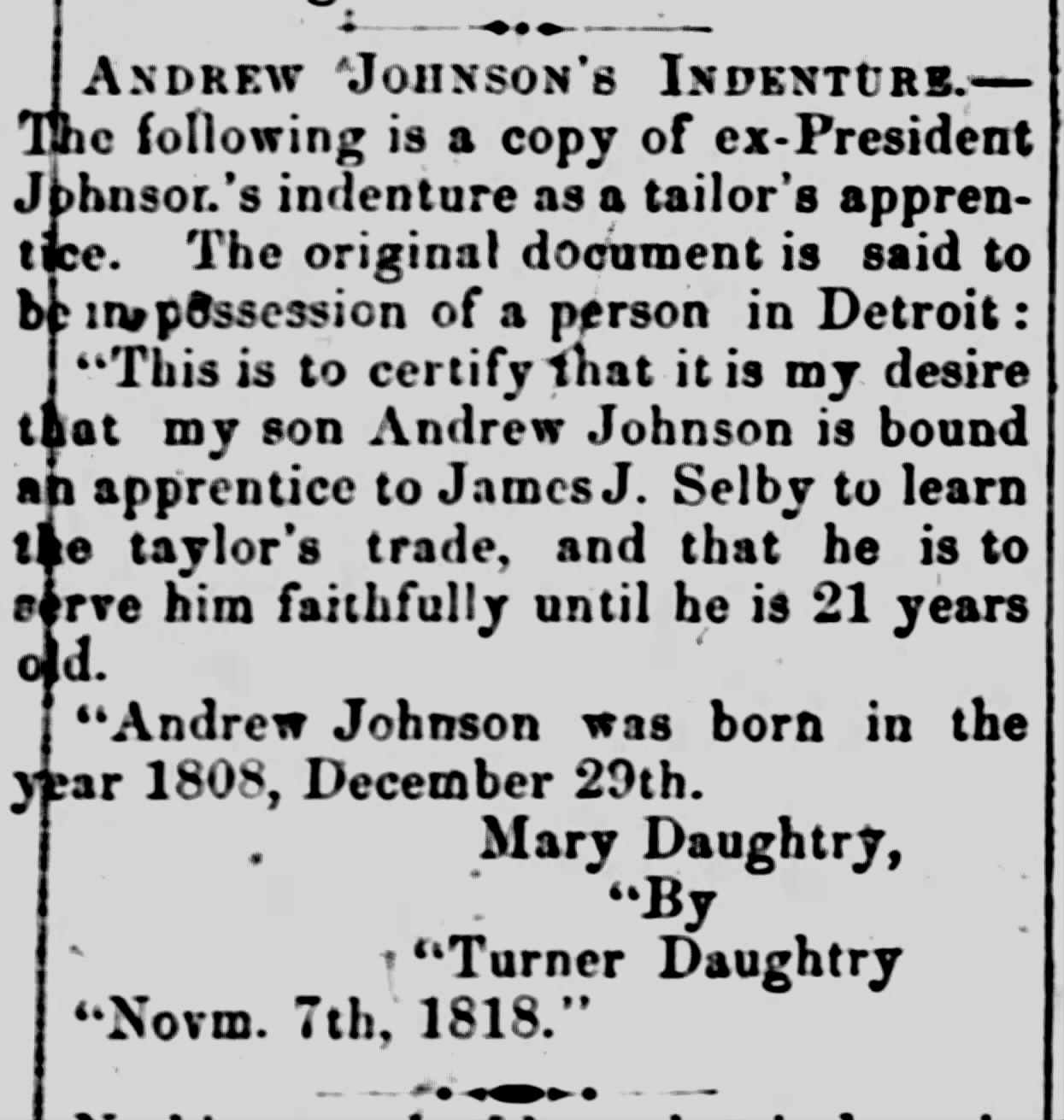
"Andrew Johnson's Indenture" (Asheville News, August 20, 1869, Page 4)

Andrew Johnson was probably experientially closer to chattel slavery than any other U.S. president. At age 10 he was indentured by his mother and stepfather to a tailor, to whom he was legally bound until age 21. He was required to work incessantly, and a traditional education was out of the question. He ran away at age 15. His master, James Selby, put a "runaway servant" ad in the newspaper. White supremacist writer, magazine editor, and librarian/archivist John Trotwood Moore described teenage Johnson in a 1929 Saturday Evening Post article as a "slave-bound boy." One study of presidential rhetorical styles argued, "no amount of success could fully compensate for the needs left from his traumatic childhood."

== See also ==
- List of United States presidential vetoes § Andrew Johnson
- Voting rights in the United States
- Bibliography of Andrew Johnson
- Presidency of Andrew Johnson
- Reconstruction era
- Freedmen's Bureau bills
- Freedmen massacres
- Reconstruction Amendments
- Nadir of American race relations
- Andrew Johnson alcoholism debate
- African Americans in Tennessee
- Woodrow Wilson and race
