= Freedmen's Mission Historic Cemetery =

19th-century African-American cemetery in Tennessee

- Interactive map of Freedmen's Mission Historic Cemetery

Details
- Established: Between 1877 and 1900
- Location: Knoxville College in Tennessee

The Freedmen's Mission Historic Cemetery, at the corner of Booker and College, is a historic African-American burial ground on the campus of Knoxville College in Tennessee, United States. The Freedmen's Mission Historic Cemetery is the burial place of several notable black Knoxvillians including "Caslers, Becks, Greens," teachers, the town's first black doctors, and several people who were formerly enslaved by Andrew Johnson, the 17th U.S. President. The cemetery, which has about 190 known graves, was previously known as Knoxville College Cemetery, College Street Cemetery, and First United Presbyterian Church Cemetery.

It is unknown when the cemetery was established but presumed to be between 1877 and 1900. The oldest grave with a marked headstone dates to 1904. The Knoxville College Cemetery Association was organized in 1900 to maintain the site. However, as descendants of the dead left Knoxville over the decades, by the early 21st century the cemetery was suffering badly as a result of neglect and vandalism.
