= Andrew Johnson alcoholism debate =

Aspect of U.S. history

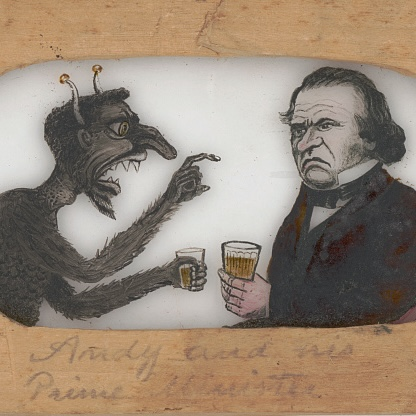
"Andy and his prime minister": Lantern slide of U.S. president Andrew Johnson drinking with the devil, painted by abolitionist and folk artist Samuel J. Reader (Liljenquist Collection, LOC)

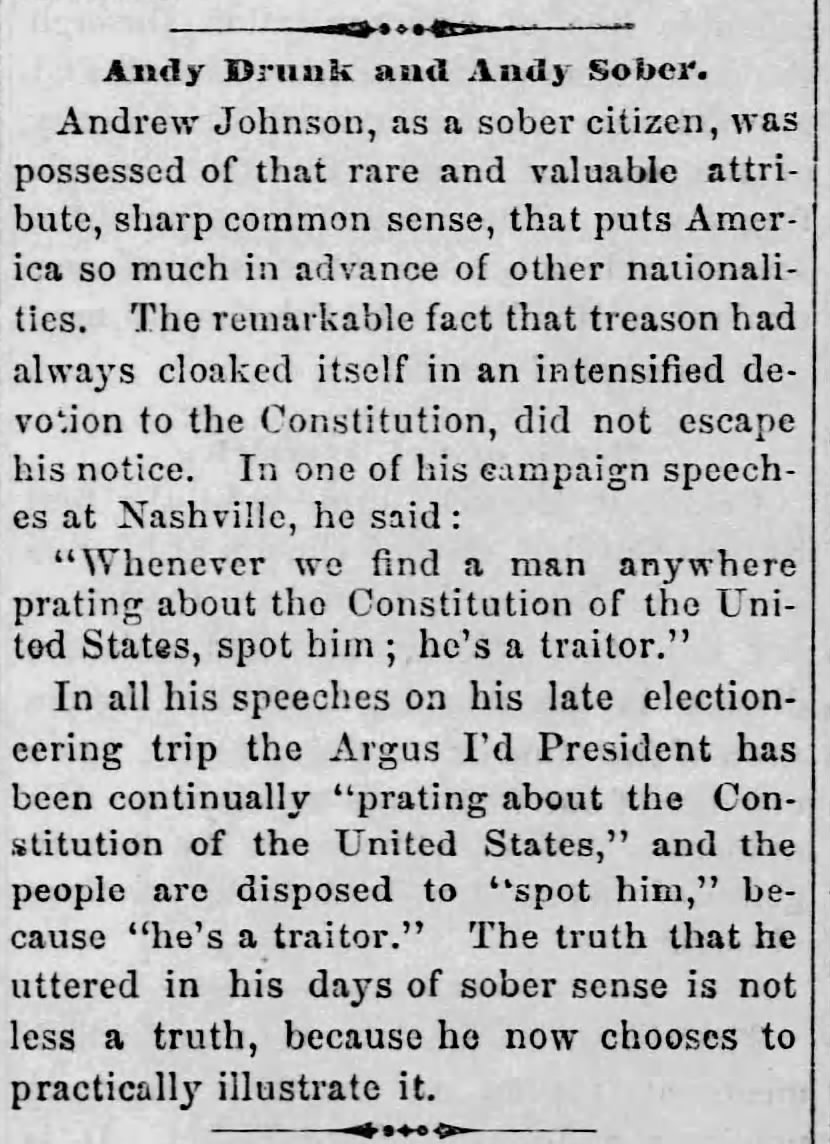
"Andy Drunk and Andy Sober": The use of "Argus I'd" here is a play on words, referring to the Ancient Greek Argus, a monster who was covered with countless eyes, replacing eye with I to suggest Johnson's self-obsession (Atchison Weekly Free Press, Atchison, Ks., Sept. 22, 1866)

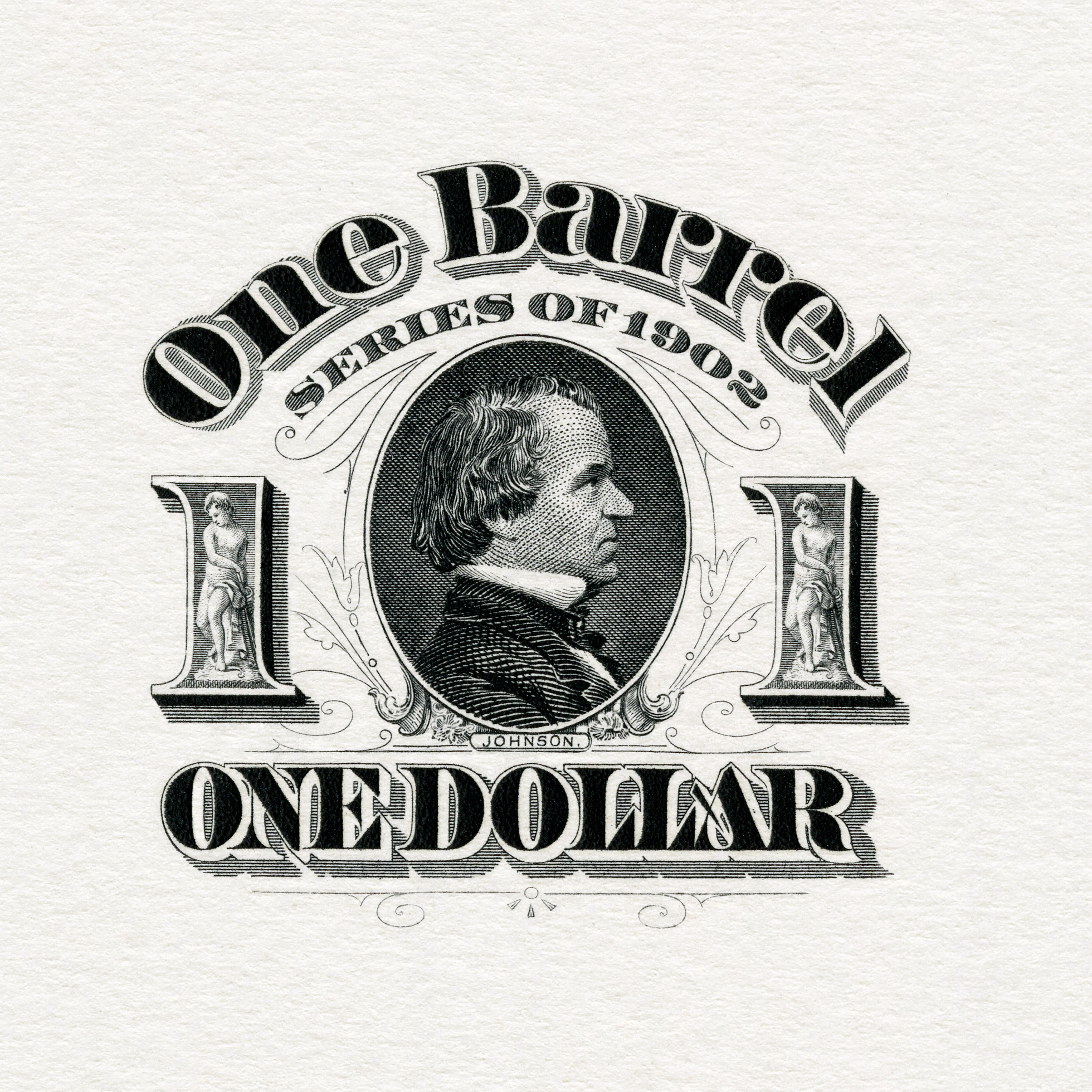
Andrew Johnson on a US Beer revenue tax stamp.

The Andrew Johnson alcoholism debate is the dispute, originally conducted amongst the general public, and now typically a question for historians, about whether or not Andrew Johnson, the 17th president of the United States, drank to excess. There is no question that Andrew Johnson consumed alcohol (as would have been typical for any Tennessean of his era and station). The debate concerns whether or not he was governing drunk, how alcohol may have altered his personality and disrupted his relationships, and if, when, or how it affected his political standing, and his current bottom-quartile historical assessment. Less so today, but in his own time, Johnson's alleged drinking contributed substantially to his peers evaluation of his "attributes of mind, character, and speech...where the good ruler is temperate, Johnson is an inebriate; where the good ruler is selfless, Johnson is self-regarding; where the good ruler is eloquent, Johnson is a rank demagogue...behind all these assumptions is the still and silent image of the Great Emancipator, but that is another story."

The Andrew Johnson alcoholism debate may be a case of questions without answers. Per historian Annette Gordon-Reed, "We will probably never know the extent to which alcohol was a part of Johnson's life. Not all alcoholics appear drunk in public, and his relatively solitary existence—his family was almost never with him and he had few friends—was exactly the kind of setup that allowed for unobtrusive drinking that could become a problem in a time of great emotional and physical stress."

We tell them we would sooner have Andy Johnson drunk than Jeff. Davis sober, or John Breckenridge either, if he could be ever found sober.

— Rev. Dr. Hancock's Temperance Address, New York, June 1865, Buffalo Advocate

== Johnson's alcohol use ==
According to two histories of alcohol in the United States, the country had three alcoholic presidents during the 19th century: Franklin Pierce, Andrew Johnson, and Ulysses S. Grant. A broad overview of the human use of intoxicants asserts that Johnson was thought to "be rarely sober." A scholarly examination of the consequences of illness in national leaders states, "The best-known instance of alcohol abuse in high office is that of Andrew Johnson, whose alcoholism figured in the debate concerning his impeachment."

"Drunkenness, of Johnson" has 16 mentions in Andrew Johnson: A Biographical Companion, which puts the topic on par with "Election of 1866" and "First Military Reconstruction Act." The Biographical Companion, citing the editors of The Papers of Andrew Johnson and Hans Trefousse, states that all charges/claims of Johnson being drunk "were false except for one incident [the March 4 inauguration]...Johnson was not intoxicated. He was merely falling back into ingrained stump-speaking habits...His actions did not conform to many people's ideas about how a president should behave." The most famous case of Andy drunk was at his 1865 vice-presidential inauguration, but it was not the first or the last time he appeared intoxicated in public, and per historian Elizabeth R. Varon, "He never lived these incidents down, although historians contend that they were greatly exaggerated." As he set out on his Swing Around the Circle tour as president, a Pennsylvania newspaper summarized the general perception (amongst his enemies, at least) of the intersection of Johnson's drinking and his politics: "From the day that Andrew Johnson took his seat as Vice President of the United States to the present moment he seems to have improved every opportunity to belittle himself and disgrace the position he holds, by either bacchanalian revels, or the retailing of vile slang in partisan speeches...His stooping to blackguard private citizens was thought to be lowest depth to which drunken recklessness could drag him down, but a lower depth has been found." A 1916 thesis on Johnson's era as military governor of Tennessee argued, "The habit of indulging in intoxicants, afterwards reputed as Johnson's most conspicuous personal failing as President, had, of course, been formed long before. There is no evidence that it interfered seriously with the performance of his duties, but it occasionally betrayed him into extravagance of action and expression which did him no credit."

Nonetheless, after examining recollections of Johnson by Vice President Hannibal Hamlin and Interior Secretary Carl Schurz, historian of alcoholism James Graham found that Andrew Johnson most likely met the criteria for problem drinking, based on accounts that suggest he indulged in benders, drank in "enormous" quantities, gulped down hard liquor as if it were water, drank in the morning, drank after drinking, and consumed excessive, inebriating quantities of alcohol at inappropriate times. Graham argues that "ugly behavior is symptomatic," and states that "It's probable that [Johnson's] alcoholism-driven ego played a more important role in his clash with Congress, which led to the attempted impeachment, than alcoholism-ignorant modern historians realize." He also argues that alcoholism is often "not noticed outside the home until the alcoholic reaches the advanced stage of the disease and starts showing the bizarre behavior associated with the condition—such as showing up drunk on the job."

=== Opinion of historians since 1900 ===
Historian	Year	Johnson alcoholic?	Notes, quotes
James Schouler	1906	No	
Clifton Hall	1916	Yes	
Robert W. Winston	1928	No	"Strangely enough, in the midst of such universal dissipation, Andrew Johnson was not overmuch afflicted with the drink habit."
Lloyd Paul Stryker	1929	No	"Like all truly temperate men he was abstemious in food as well as drink."
George Fort Milton	1930	No	No, per memoir of McCulloch
Howard K. Beale	1930	?	
Paul Buck	1938	?	
Peter Levin	1948	?	
Milton Lomask	1960	?	
Fay W. Brabson	1972	No	"He did not use tobacco in any form, and was discreet in the use of liquors. As was the general habit of men in his stratum of society, and especially of men in political life, he took a social drink. His personal and political enemies made the most of even this temperate habit of drinking by resorting to deft exaggeration or by straight lying."
Eric L. McKitrick	1961	Drinking issue left largely unexamined	Mentions apparent exoneration on charges of drinking round the circle
Albert Castel	1979	Inconclusive	"...once again [Johnson] succumbed to oratorical self-intoxication..."
Hans L. Trefousse	1989	No	
Annette Gordon-Reed	2011	Inconclusive	

=== Disordered alcohol use in Johnson's family ===
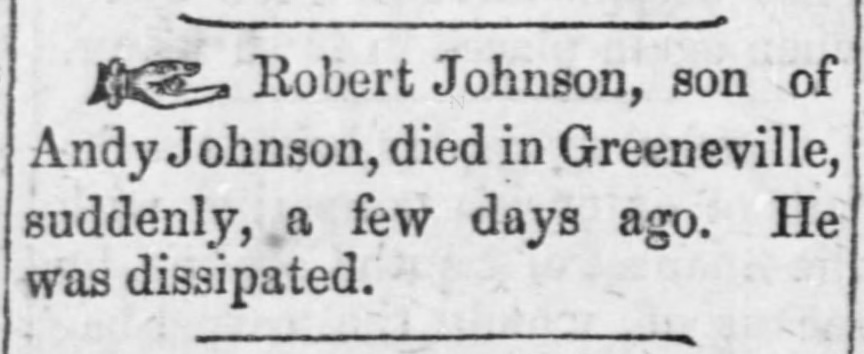
"Robert Johnson, son of Andy Johnson, died in Greeneville, suddenly, a few days ago. He was dissipated." (Fayetteville Observer, Fayetteville, Tenn., April 29, 1869)

Given that alcoholism in family systems continues to be a subject of addiction research, it may be relevant that all three of Johnson's sons struggled with alcoholism, quite publicly in the case of Robert Johnson—he was in the New York State Inebriate Asylum at the time of Grant's inauguration. Robert died of an overdose of alcohol and laudanum, but by some historians theorize that alcohol was also involved in the youthful deaths of Charles and Frank, which are otherwise attributed to accident and tuberculosis, respectively. Further, there are suggestions that David T. Patterson, who was married to Johnson's daughter Martha, had a drinking problem. During the impeachment process, Andrew Johnson himself wrote, "I have had a son killed, a son-in-law die during the last battle at Nashville, another son has thrown himself away, a second son-in-law is in no better condition. I think I have had sorrow enough without having my bank account examined by a Committee of Congress," referring to Charles, Dan Stover, Robert, and Patterson (a sitting U.S. Senator), respectively. In 1891, three months before Patterson's death, a newspaper article described him as "fallen before the same terrific curse which swept away the head of [Martha Johnson Patterson's] family and three talented boys." There are also two newspaper reports that William A. Browning, who worked as Johnson's personal secretary for many years, died of alcohol dependence at age 31.

Hans Trefousse, who wrote the most recent full-length scholarly biography of Johnson, argued, "...although his sons suffered from alcoholism, and he himself was constantly accused of it after his inauguration, it seems evident that, unlike a true alcoholic, Johnson could take or leave his liquor at will."

=== Chronic alcoholic abuse or character flaws? ===
On the whole, historians seem to have concluded that Johnson's problems were not solely a consequence of whisky. W.E.B. DuBois described him as "drunk, not so much with liquor, as with the heady wine of sudden and accidental success." However, "The Atlantic Monthly thought Johnson 'Egotistic to the point of mental disease,'" and the two issues may have overlapped, as "Studies have shown links between narcissistic behavioral patterns and substance abuse issues." In analyzing speeches that seemed like the drunken harangues of a half-deranged misanthrope, historians often find as much evidence for self-obsession as inebriation, as determined by audits of Johnson's favorite topic: himself. For example, in the official transcript of Johnson's vice-presidential inauguration speech, historian Stephen Howard Browne found "extraordinary use of the pronominal and possessive first person. In a speech of approximately 800 words, such constructions run to 28 'I's and nine 'my's. Indeed, in the first paragraph alone 'I' is deployed no less than 20 times. Now, a certain preoccupation with the self is no doubt to be expected under such circumstances, but as his audiences would learn soon enough, Johnson's phrasing here foreshadows an almost pathological fixation on his personal identity."

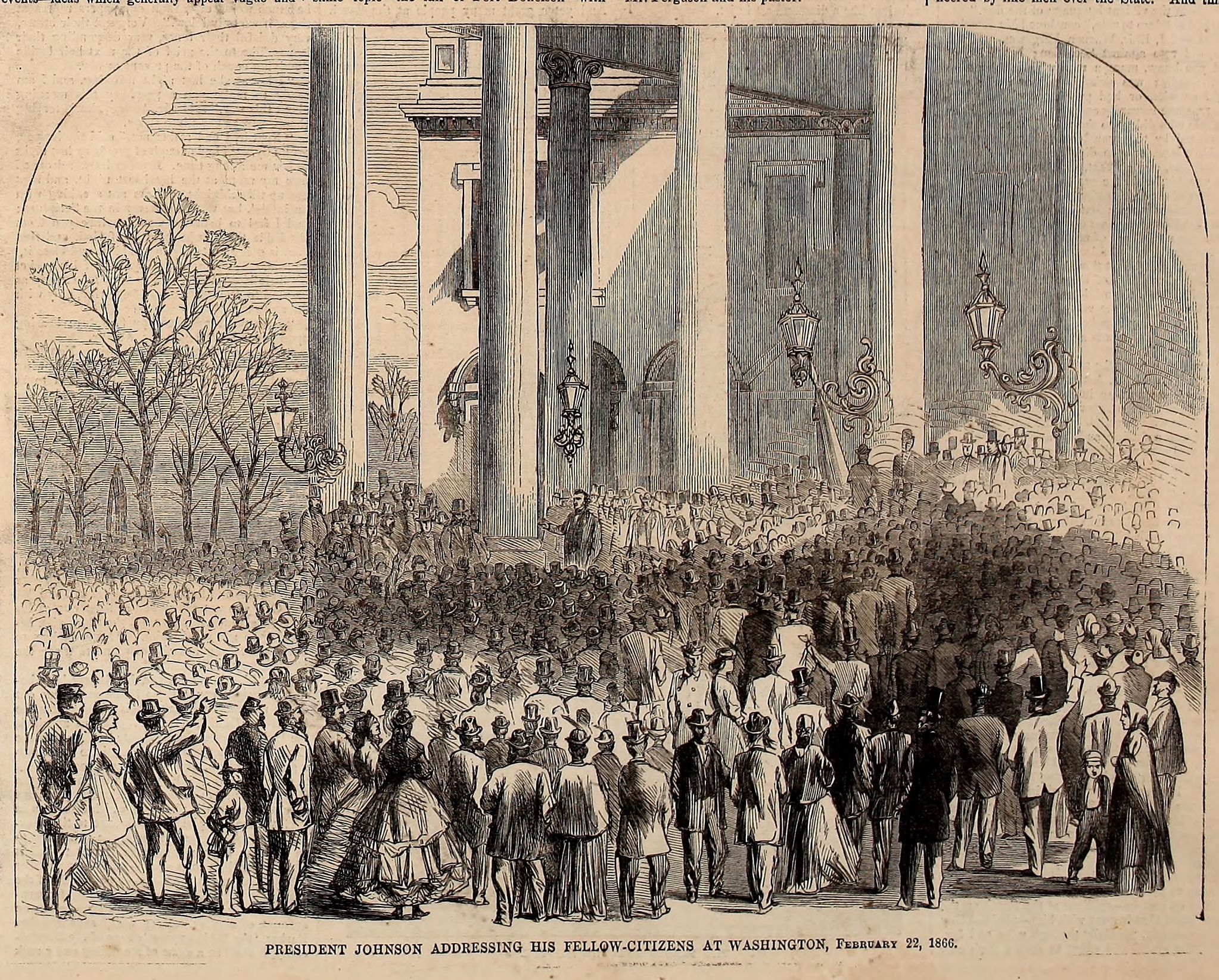
"President Johnson addressing his fellow-citizens at Washington, February 22, 1866" (Harper's Weekly, March 10, 1866)

Similarly, lowlights of the notorious Washington's Birthday speech of 1866 included its long duration, apparent ignorance of political reality, persecutory delusions, sullen resentment, thin-skinned "intolerance of criticism," egotism ("Who, I ask, has suffered more for the Union than I have?"), and more than 200 self-references. Per historian Eric McKitrick in his ground-breaking Andrew Johnson and Reconstruction (1961), what the audience saw and heard was not the President under the influence of mind-altering substances but "Andrew Johnson the man, fully true to his themes of his career and character." According to historian Greg Phifer, The Boston Transcript summarized Johnson's Swing Around the Circle speeches in the fall of 1866 as "beginning with thanks, continuing with 'my sacrifices, my losses, my policy,' and always including "I, I, I, My, My, Me, Me.' "

=== Taste and preferences ===
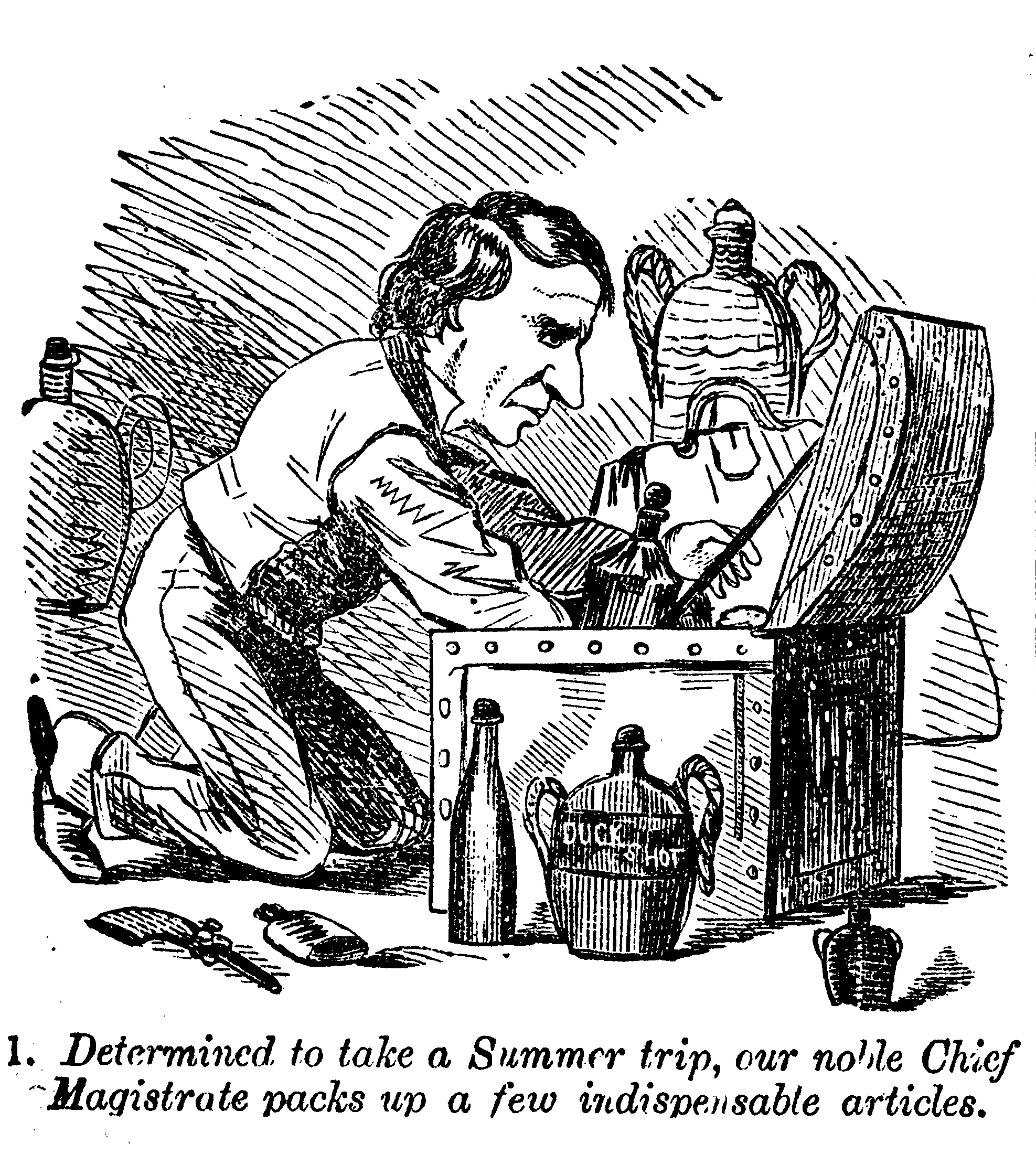
Swingin' Round the Cirkle, or Andy's trip to the West, together with a life of its hero by "Petroleum V. Nasby" (a satiric persona of Ohio journalist David Ross Locke) shows Johnson packing whisky jugs and bottles for his electioneering trip of 1866

According to Mint Juleps with Teddy Roosevelt: The Complete History of Presidential Drinking, "Andy Johnson may not have been a drunkard, but neither was he a stranger to whiskey. If one reads through his letters and bills, there is ample evidence that Johnson possessed a discernible taste for quality whiskey—and was willing to pay good money to get it." A conflicting account of Johnson's taste comes from John B. Brownlow in an 1892 letter to Oliver Perry Temple: "Johnson was always perfectly indifferent to the quality of whiskey he drank, he smacked his lips and enjoyed the meanest whiskey hot and fresh from the still, with the fusil oil on it, and stuff that would vomit a gentleman..." According to historian David Warren Bowen, Johnson's back-slapping, swill-chugging persona was part of a larger "almost pathetic appeal for acceptance". According to DuBois, Johnson was known to consume "three or four glasses of Robertson's Canada Whiskey" per day. Benjamin C. Truman, who was Johnson's personal secretary for a time during the American Civil War, said much the same, that Johnson pretty much only drank Robertson County whiskey (he refused wine with meals and disliked champagne), he avoided bars and saloons, and that four glasses a day was not unusual for him, although he didn't necessarily drink daily. In the 19th century, Robertson County, Tennessee distilled more whisky than any other county in the state. Robertson County produced a "distinctive" sour mash whisky that was said to be "similar to, but not quite the same as, Kentucky bourbon."

The recollections of Carl Schurz, M. V. Moore, and others also suggest that Johnson would periodically isolate himself and go on multi-day binges. The Johnson family may have used the term "spree" to describe such binge drinking.

=== Public statements on drinking ===
As for Johnson's own testimony on the sale and consumption of alcohol, according The Curse of Drink: Or, Stories of Hell's Commerce:

- "The whiskey business is the poison vine which entwines itself around the oaks of our national prosperity, the noxious weed that has sprung up in the garden of American industries, the nauseating bilge-water in our glorious ship of state, the pest of all ages."
- "Taxation means representation, permission, protection and perpetuity. License money is a bribe and the acceptance of it by the United States is a national sin....You shall not press down upon the brow of American homes the crown of thorns platted by the hand of the liquor traffic; you shall not crucify man upon a cross of high license."

== Vice-presidential inauguration (March 4, 1865) ==
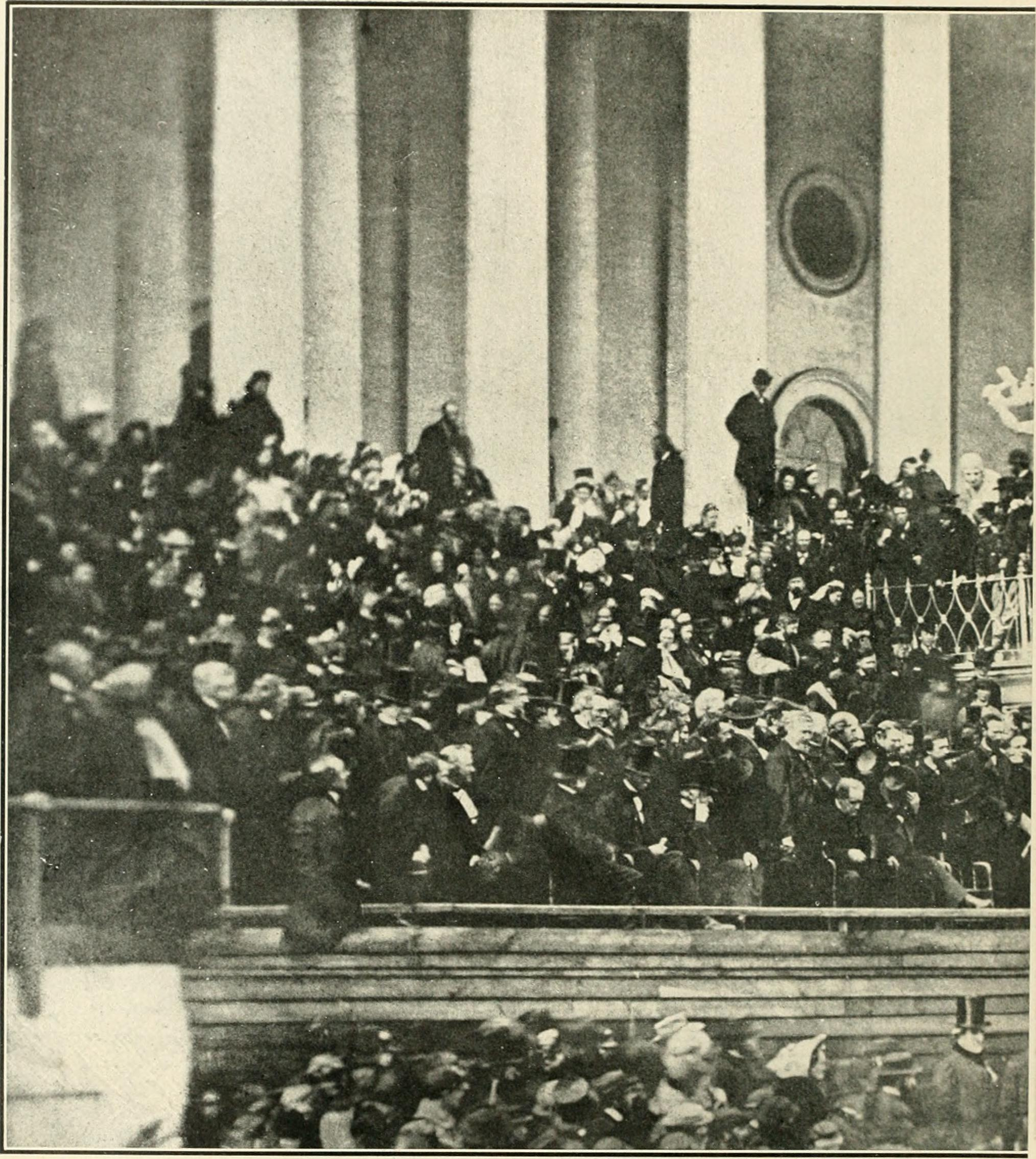
Alexander Gardner took this photo during Lincoln's second inaugural address; Johnson, sworn in earlier in the day, is the individual seated in the front row, far right, holding his hat over his face (The Photographic History of the Civil War, 1911)

The incident that set the stage for almost all later evaluation of Johnson's drinking habits was his floridly drunk speech on the floor of the U.S. Senate on the occasion of his swearing-in as Vice President of the United States. Serious historians describe him as "plastered," and recount that he "humiliated himself before everyone of importance in Washington."

The spectacle inspired a song performed at a theater on E Street:

And there Great Andy Johnson got
And took a brandy-toddy hot,
Which made him drunk as any sot,
At the Inauguration.

And now to wipe out the disgrace,
The President has closed the place,
Where Andy Johnson fell from grace,—
At the Inauguration!

In the end, whether or not he exhibited clinically significant symptoms of alcoholism during his presidency, after the March 4 spectacle at the U.S. Capitol, "it did not much matter what the truth was about his drinking habits. The truth that mattered was that he had set himself up, made himself vulnerable to charges of drunkenness at virtually every crisis that beset his late political career."

== Presidential inauguration (April 15, 1865) ==
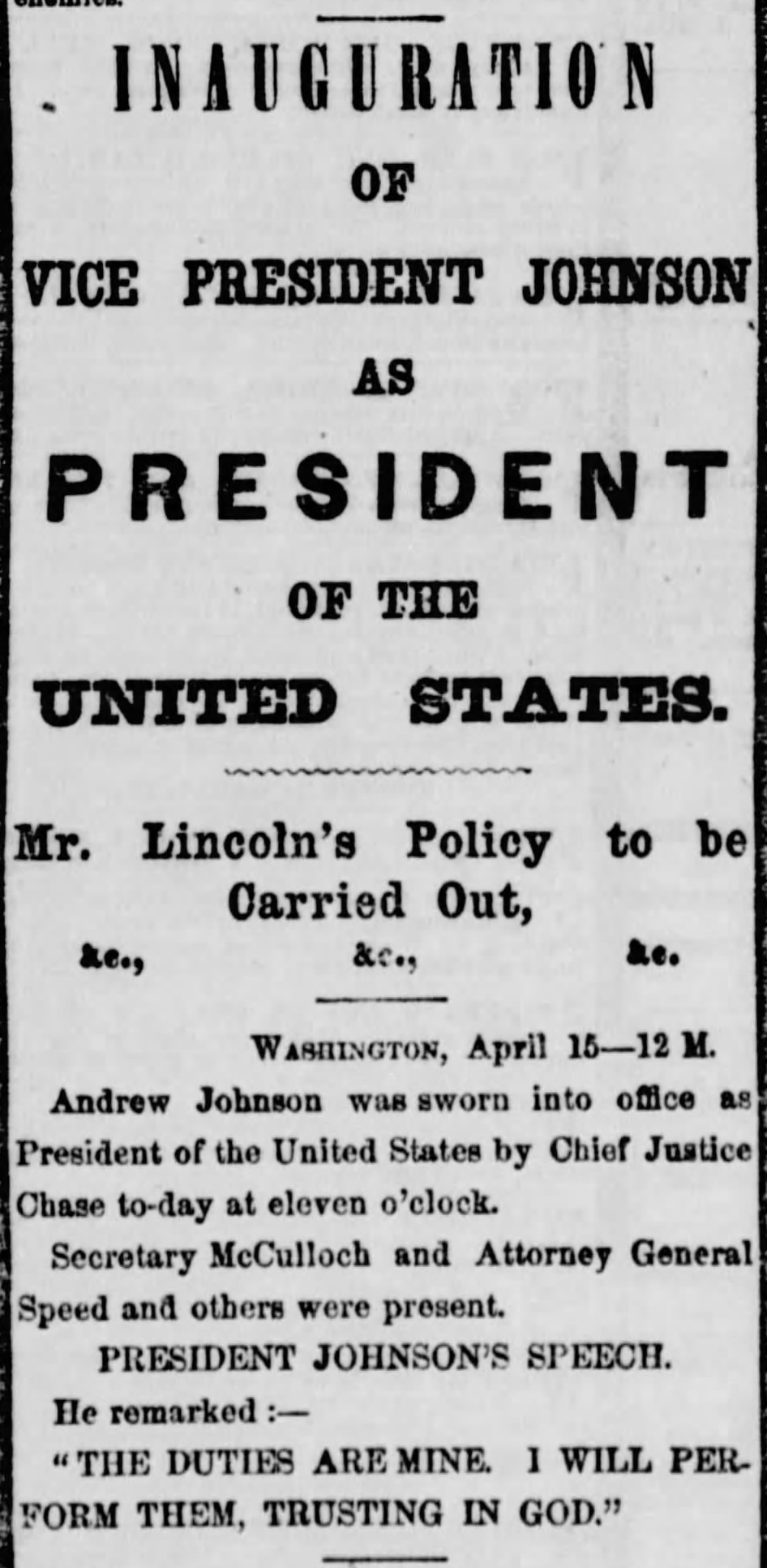
Most of what we know about the swearing-in of Johnson comes from one wire report

In 1908, former U.S. Senator William Morris Stewart published his Reminiscences, and most of the 20th chapter of the book is devoted to the abbreviated second term of Abraham Lincoln. One of the Chapter XX subtitles is "How a drunken man was sworn in as President."

Trefousse, Johnson's most recent major biographer, discounts Stewart's account entirely, writing, "The falsity of these assertions is evident. Stewart's account of the swearing in is contradicted by most other contemporary sources, including a memorandum in the chief justice's papers prepared the next day. The fact that the president took his oath at a later time than eight in the morning is well attested by various newspapermen, who failed to see any sign of drunkenness or a hangover. Moreover, the cabinet meeting at noon, which Welles recorded in his diary as well as in other memoranda, is proof positive of Johnson's condition and whereabouts on the fifteenth." However, some or all of these refutations appear to be responses to straw-man arguments.

== Comments by contemporaries ==
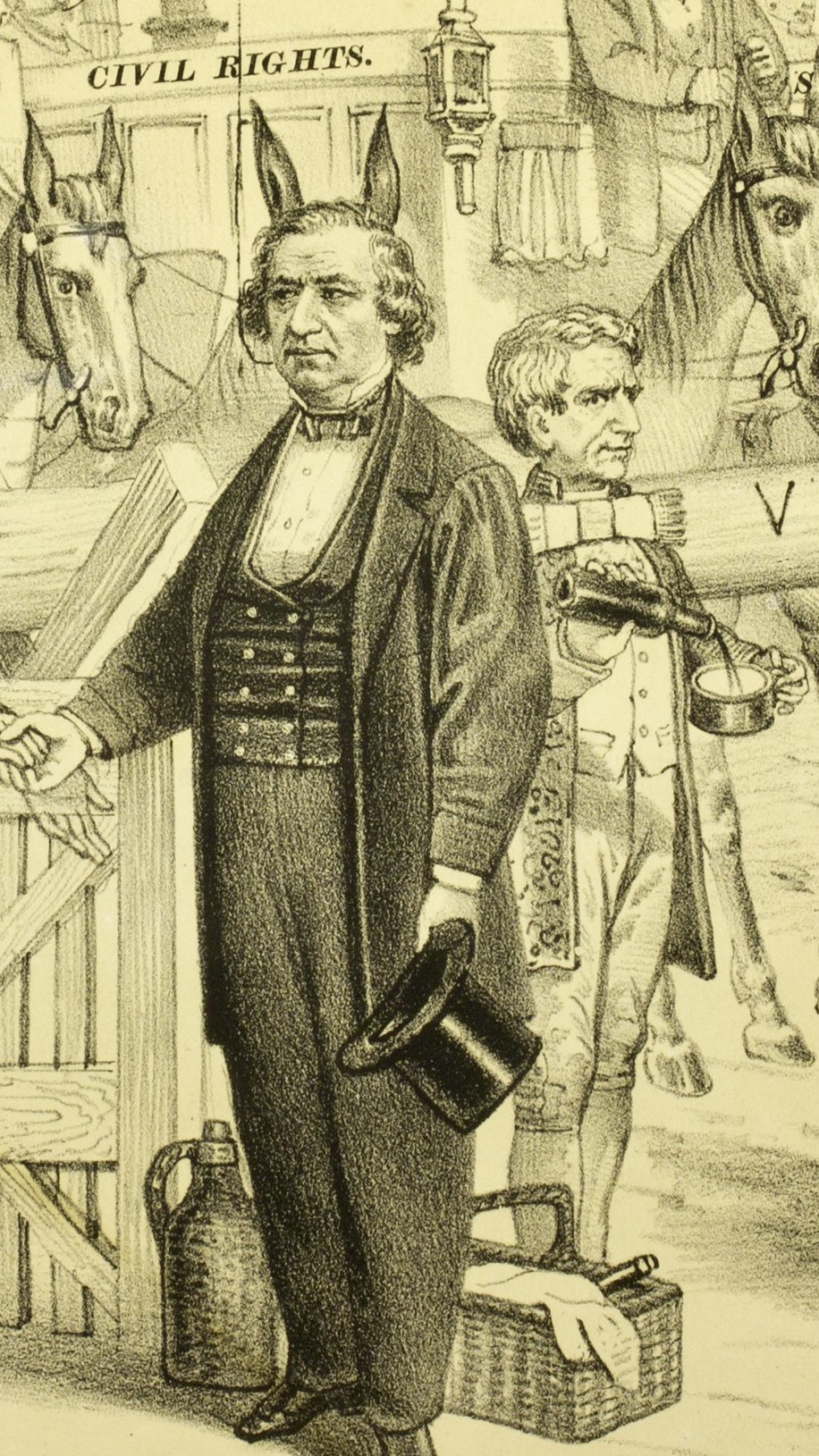
Detail of a political cartoon about Johnson's vetoes of Reconstruction legislation; a jug sits at Johnson's feet while Secretary of State Seward pours out another drink

- Representative-elect Benjamin F. Butler, speaking at the Brooklyn Academy of Music on November 24, 1866 said,
  As to the specification and evidence of the first charge of public drunkenness, if common uncontradicted fame speaks truly, and that it does in this instance, the blush at shame which mantles the cheek of every true American when the occurrence is mentioned, is the highest guaranty—then every Senator who witnessed the disgraceful stammering tongue of the Vice President as he mumbled his oath of office, and slobbered the Holy Book with a drunken kiss, will be at once the witness and judge, and to other like public and disgraceful exhibitions almost every depot and station master between Washington and St. Louis can give evidence."
  That same month, Butler cited drunk appearances by Johnson at "official and public occasions" as a potential cause for impeachment for, "degrading and debasing...the station and dignity of the office of Vice-President and that of president".
- John Weiss Forney, writing as Col. Forney, Secretary of the United States Senate, writing "Anecdotes of the Vice Presidents" in 1878: "Schuyler Colfax was like Andrew Johnson in his stern personal integrity, but unlike him in the ultra moderation of his habits."
- Methodist Episcopal Bishop Gilbert Haven, July 4, 1879: "The Martyr-President had left a drunken imbecile in power: obstinate, unreasoning, unreasonable, with only one saving quality—devotion to the Union."
- "J. L." in a letter to The Tennessean published on October 29, 1885 wrote,
  I do not believe that Andrew Johnson was an opium eater as the New York Sun suggests, but he was a hard drinker and whenever he had indulged to excess for any long period of time the effect upon his temper was strongly marked. It was unfavorable to amiability, making him unkind and exceedingly rude and offensive in his manners. When he was inaugurated as Vice President on the 4th of March 1865 he had been on one of the most protracted sprees of his life and was at the time so inebriated as to make himself a spectacle as he attempted incoherently to utter an inaugural address. His friend, the elder Blair, took him from Washington to his country home to sober up. This was scarcely six weeks before the death of Lincoln. How well Mr. Blair succeeded in his good office I am unable to say but the temper displayed by Johnson or at least the tone of his utterances and some of his official conduct indicate that the whisky devil was not as yet fully exorcised when he came to the Presidency. Nevertheless we must regard much of his loyal fury as assumed. No politician was a more complete master of buncomb than Andrew Johnson. His utterances were loud and repeated that 'treason must be made odious and traitors punished'. Yet he was issuing pardons by the hundreds or thousands all the time and the cases of punishment were few. I am not his apologist for he counted the writer among his enemies. It was my purpose to support him in the right and oppose him in the wrong regardless of our personal dislike, which was mutual. The result was that in many things I was against him.
- Hugh McCulloch, Treasury Secretary to both Lincoln and Johnson, memoirs published 1888: "Mr. Johnson was especially intemperate as a speaker when defending his policy and replying to the severe criticism to which he was subjected, but not in the use of liquor. I had good opportunities for observing his habits, and my fears made me watchful. For six weeks after he became president, he occupied a room adjoining mine, and communicating with it, in the Treasury Department. He was there every morning before nine o'clock, and he rarely left before five. There was no liquor in his room. It was open to everybody. His luncheon, when he had one, was, like mine, a cup of tea and a cracker. It was in that room that he received the delegations that waited upon him, and the personal and political friends who called to pay their respects. It was there that he made the speeches which startled the country by the bitterness of their tone their almost savage denunciations of secessionists as traitors who merited the traitor's doom. So intemperate were some of these speeches, that I should have attributed them to the use of stimulants if I had not known them to be the speeches of a sober man, who could not over come the habit of denunciatory declamation which he had formed in his bitter contests in Tennessee. They were, like all of his subsequent offhand addresses, quite unsuited to his position as president. If he had been smitten with dumbness when he was elected Vice-President, he would have escaped a world of trouble. From that time onward he never made an offhand public speech by which he did not suffer in public estimation, but none of them could be charged to the account of strong drink. For nearly four years I had daily intercourse with him, frequently at night, and I never saw him when under the influence of liquor. I have no hesitation in saying that whatever may have been his faults, intemperance was not among them."
- M. V. Moore, apparently an acquaintance of Johnson from Tennessee, was published in the Philadelphia Weekly Times and reprinted in the Memphis Public Ledger in 1891 as proclaiming,
  Let us see how he went into the mills of the gods—into that of Nemesis especially. The avenging angel visited not once, simply, but the scourge came to Mr. Johnson again and again. It is a sorrowful history, that of his family. Of the three bright, promising sons born to him all died victims of the same enemy that carried the illustrious father away—the bottle. One of the young men was a dear fellow who I knew and loved well. One day during the war he was toppled from his horse on the streets of Nashville, Tenn. He was picked up with a broken skull. Andrew Johnson himself went off on a 'big spree.' He had been in the habit of 'getting off his balance' (to use a milder phrase)—shutting himself up in his room, attended alone by a faithful servant. When in this condition, if aroused or approached by others, he would swear like a maniac, hurling huge anathemas at friend and foe alike.

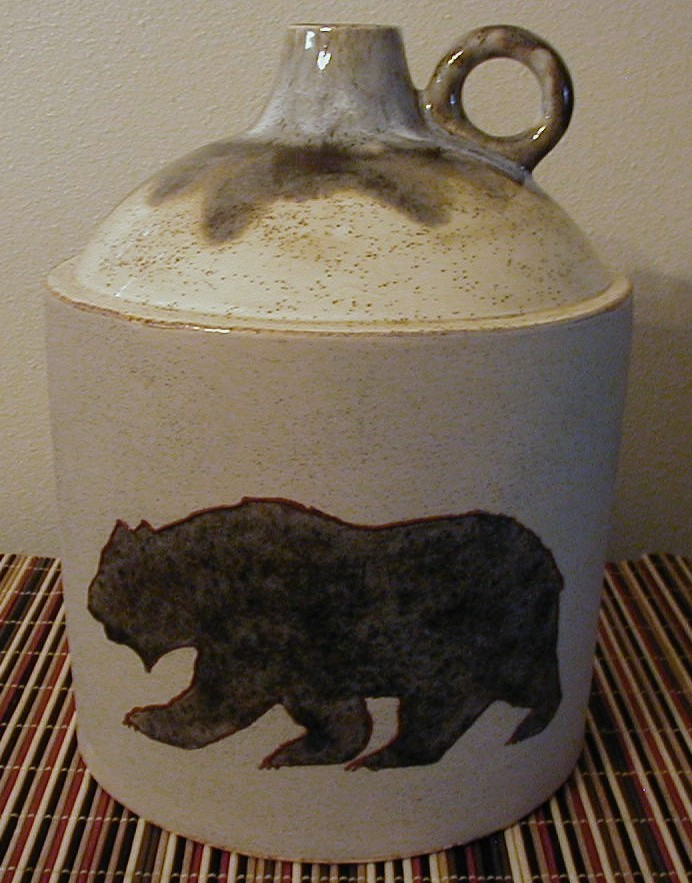
Drinkers of the Civil War era might have been served from glazed earthenware jugs (such as this contemporary creation photographed 2011)

- Charles A. Dana, a once and future journalist working for the U.S. Department of War during the American Civil War, met Johnson when he was military governor of Tennessee, memoir published 1898: "So he brought out a jug of whisky and poured out as much as he wanted in a tumbler, and then made it about half and half water. The theoretical, philosophical drinker pours out a little whisky and puts in almost no water at all—drinks it pretty nearly pure—but when a man gets to taking a good deal of water in his whisky, it shows he is in the habit of drinking a good deal. I noticed that the Governor took more whisky than most gentlemen would have done, and I concluded that he took it pretty often."
- Secretary of the Interior Carl Schurz, in his recollections of Johnson as military governor, as published 1907: "Yet I could not rid myself of the impression that beneath this staid and sober exterior there were still some wildfires burning which occasionally might burst to the surface. This impression was strengthened by a singular experience. It happened twice or three times that, when I called upon him, I was told by the attendant that the Governor was sick and could not see anybody; then, after the lapse of four or five days, he would send for me, and I would find him uncommonly natty in his attire, and generally 'groomed' with especial care. He would also wave off any inquiry about his health. When I mentioned this circumstance to one of the most prominent Union men of Nashville, he smiled, and said that the Governor had 'his infirmities,' but was 'all right' on the whole."
- U.S. Senator from New Hampshire and Assistant Treasury Secretary under Lincoln William E. Chandler described Andrew Johnson in 1907 as "not the drunken boor of the public fancy but...a mild-mannered, earnest, quiet, kindly man, who did surprisingly well in view of his antecedents and environments."
- Tennessee governor and U.S. Senator William G. Brownlow, by way of Chief Justice Salmon P. Chase, by way of Walter P. Brownlow, published in 1909: "As the editor of a Whig newspaper and a speaker in every political campaign we have had in Tennessee since Johnson's entrance into public life I have fought him so zealously that for twenty years we were not on speaking terms. I never failed to publicly denounce him for anything which I believed he did which I regarded as disreputable, as I certainly do the excessive use of liquor, but I never charged him with being a drunkard because I had no grounds for so doing. I do not mean to say that he was a total abstainer from the use of intoxicating drinks, as I have always been, and as I think every man should be, but I do mean that nobody in Tennessee ever regarded him as addicted to their excessive use."
- William H. Crook, U.S. Secret Service, published 1910: "I very soon began to realize that the reports of his drinking to excess were, like many other slanders, without foundation. I will state here that during the years he was in the White House there never was any foundation for it...I saw him probably every day...and I never once saw him under the influence of liquor...No man whose wits were fuddled with alcohol could have done what he did in Tennessee and Washington. He drank, as did virtually most public men of the time, a notable exception being Mr. Lincoln. The White House cellars were well stocked with wine and whiskies, which he offered to his guests at dinner or luncheon, but in my experience he never drank to excess."
- Ben C. Truman, private secretary to Johnson during the war, also war correspondent, later owned several newspapers, writing c. 1913: "But that Andrew Johnson was a drunkard is more difficult to disprove...But had not Johnson been a drinking man through his life? I have often been asked. Not to the extent the one incident implied. Indeed Johnson had been considered a temperate man in all things. I sat with him at the same table in Nashville at least once a day for eighteen months and never saw him take wine or liquor with any meal. He never drank a cocktail in his life, never was in a barroom, and did not care for champagne. He did take two or three or four glasses of Robertson county whiskey. Some days some days less, and some days and weeks no liquor at all. So as drinking went in Tennessee, Johnson would have been termed a strictly temperate man."
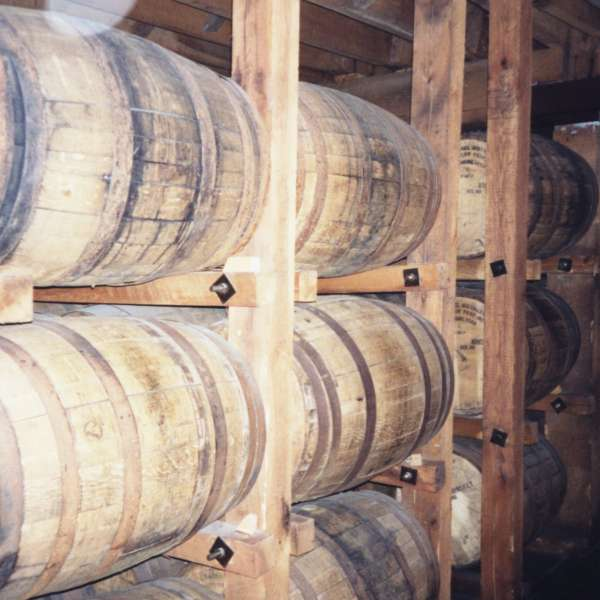
  Tennessee whiskey aging in barrels
- Former U.S. Senator Chauncey Depew wrote in his memoirs that were published in 1924,
  President Andrew Johnson differed radically from any President of the United States whom it has been my good fortune to know. This refers to all from and including Mr. Lincoln to Mr. Harding...His weakness was alcoholism. He made a fearful exhibition of himself at the time of his inauguration and during the presidency, and especially during his famous trip 'around the circle' he was in a bad way.
- A. J. Patterson, Johnson's grandson (and consul to Demerara, British Guyana in the 1890s), in a letter of June 1928 to David R. Barbee: "I heard my mother say that she never saw him...under the influence of liquor but once in her life...I was 18 years old when he died, lived as part of the household the full period of his tenancy of the White House, and I never knew of him being drunk." Similarly, Patterson told Fay W. Brabson that Gideon Welles' son Edgar T. Welles had told him that "Andrew Johnson did not drink on the famous political campaign known as 'The Swing Around the Circle.'"

When Andy was really Governor of Tennessee to save money he boarded in a Livery Stable but since he is no Ass—though he "often felt his oats and oftener his rye"—he took his forage upstairs.

— Unsigned, Knoxville Daily Register, 1862

== Other allegations of public inebriation ==
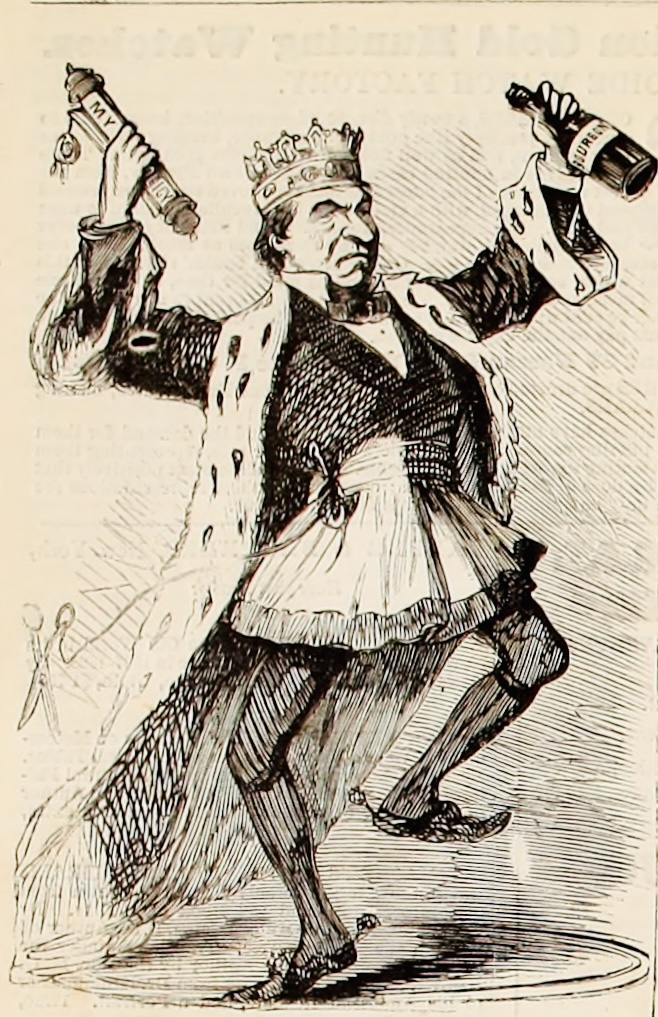
Thomas Nast's "Effect of the Vote on the Eleventh Article of Impeachment" was, compared to his grand Amphitheatrum Johnsonianum, a "simpler but meaner" depiction of Johnson. At the nadir of Nast's reputation as a Johnson hater, one art historian described this cartoon as Johnson "in crown and ermine, capering with joy over his single-vote margin in the impeachment trial. From his waist dangles a pair of scissors" (which is a mocking reference to Johnson, a former tailor, as "the knight of the goose and shears") and the bottle of bourbon that he "flourishes aloft...turned his untimely lapse from sobriety into a symbol of habitual drunkenness. It took two generations to correct the false impressions about Johnson that these cartoons helped to create."

- Moses speech at Nashville on the night of October 24, 1864; a historian writing in 1916 seemingly suggested that Johnson freed the slaves of Tennessee by fiat because he was drunk: "Johnson addressed the crowd at the capitol in a speech of which we have several highly colored and garbled reports, the most favorable of which does him no credit as a statesman. Rather, to have resorted to the devices of the demagogue to sway the ignorant and excited blacks, and his extravagances of expression suggest his too-constant friend, the whiskey bottle, as the inspiration of his unfortunate diatribe."
- In 1866, Rev. Beecher reported that Samuel C. Pomeroy, a U.S. Senator from Kansas "had called at the White House and found the President, his son [and private Secretary Robert Johnson] and his son-in-law [U.S. Senator David T. Patterson] all drunk and unfit for business. When questioned about it, Pomeroy denied having said he had seen the President drunk, but he had seen Robert Johnson very much so."
- According to the Biographical Companion "many people suggested" he was drunk when he made speech made in honor of Washington's Birthday in 1866 "but Johnson was not intoxicated". Even Johnson's sworn enemy in Congress, Benjamin F. Butler, agreed that he was sober on that occasion, stating, "Can there be anything more indecent and degrading to the office of the President of the United States than the exhibition made by Andrew Johnson on the 22nd of February last, for which there is, unfortunately for the honor of the country, not the apology that he was drunk?"
- Per Milton in his 1930 Age of Hate, "The claim was made that the President had been 'dead drunk' when he made his Cleveland speech, although it was later proved at the impeachment trial that this charge was a slander."
- Delaware newspaper in the midst of the Swing Around the Circle tour: "The Vice President is as incapable of appreciating the reparation which he owes to the country as he shows himself to be incapable of appreciating his own insult to the country. He is reported in the Washington telegrams to be indulging still another debauch. Nothing better is to be expected of him. These are the habits of his lifetime, they were known to the politicians who nominated him, they were proclaimed in the face of the party which elected him. It is idle to ask the stream to rise higher than its fountain."
- In August 1866 a Kansas paper suggested that the true cause of Andrew Johnson's tears at accounts of the pro-Johnson 1866 National Union Convention was not merely a surfeit of maudlin patriotism but a surfeit of whiskey: "It has been observed that men bordering upon a state of delirium tremens are affected to tears by trivial circumstances, and in a manner to make them appear silly in the extreme. Is not A. Johnson in that fix?"
- In a private letter to his father in October 1866, F. W. Drury of Alton, Illinois wrote of Johnson's recent Swing Around the Circle tour: "His speech, his drunken driveling slobbering harangue at the Southern Hotel at St. Louis was the straw that broke the camels back it was the most disgusting tirade that ever emanated from any man—it would have disgraced Ben Peake, or General Pomeroy. He was drunk, drunk!"

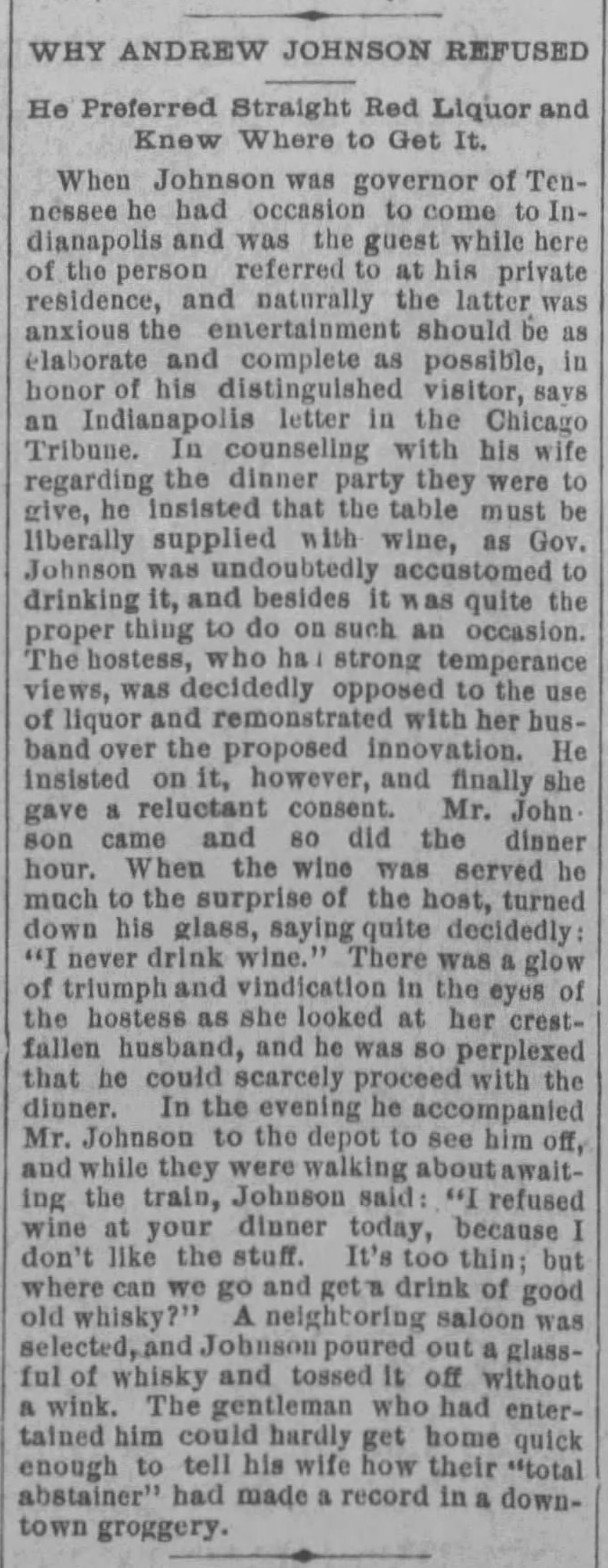
An old joke retold with Andrew Johnson as the main character ("Why Andrew Johnson Refused" Memphis Avalanche, Dec. 3, 1887)

- John S. Wise, a former U.S. Congressman and U.S. Attorney for the Eastern District of Virginia, recollecting approximately 1875, in his book published 1906:

My next sight of Mr. Johnson was probably a year or so later, shortly before his death. It was soon after his campaign before the Tennessee Legislature for the Senate. At that time his habits had become exceedingly dissipated, and one of his peculiarities was that he appeared to select very young men as his companions in his debauches. His headquarters were at the Maxwell House at that time...A band serenaded him and the street was thronged with an immense crowd, cheering and calling loudly for a speech. After a long delay the ex-President appeared upon the hotel balcony and acknowledged the compliment, but his condition was such that he was totally unable to speak coherently and, in fact, found difficulty keeping his feet. It was a pitiful sight to see him standing there, holding on to the iron railing in front of him and swaying back and forth, almost inarticulate with drink...It was a sight I shall never forget—the bloated, stupid, helpless look of Mr. Johnson, as he was hurried away from the balcony to his rooms by his friends and led staggering through the corridors of the Maxwell House...He died shortly after the occurrence just related."

== See also ==
- Historical reputation of Ulysses S. Grant § Drinking
- Age and health concerns about Donald Trump
- Age and health concerns about Joe Biden
- Emily Harold – American woman (1820–1872)
- Bibliography of Andrew Johnson
