= Emily Harold =

American woman (1820–1872)

- Born: Emily Wright; May 29, 1820 (approximated); Tennessee, U.S.
- Died: May 8, 1872 (aged 51); Tennessee, U.S.
- Other names: Mrs. James W. Harold; last name frequently misspelled Herold, Harrold or Herrold (Note: Mrs. Harold's name is listed incorrectly as Emily Harrell in Hans Trefousse's 1989 biography of Johnson.)
- Occupation: Housewife
- Known for: Accused by anonymous poison-pen letter of conducting an extramarital affair with former U.S. President Andrew Johnson, subsequently committed suicide

Emily Wright Harold (c. May 29, 1820 – May 8, 1872) was a 19th-century American wife and mother who lived most of her life in Greeneville, Tennessee. In 1872, Harold was accused (in an anonymous letter) of engaging in an extramarital affair with her neighbor, former U.S. President Andrew Johnson. She subsequently committed suicide by firearm. Johnson was a candidate for a seat in the U.S. House of Representatives that year. The alleged sexual relationship, Mrs. Harold's suicide, and an ensuing libel trial all made national headlines.

== Background ==
Andrew Johnson's personal life is generally poorly attested in the historical record. The tragic case of Mrs. Harold is no exception; she appears not at all in Robert W. Winston's 1928 biography of Johnson, and warrants but a scant paragraph (in which her name is misspelled) in Hans L. Trefousse's 1989 bio; when that book was published American Heritage magazine noted that "Trefousse resists the temptation to moralize. He puts no credence in the rumors of Johnson's alcoholism...and dismisses stories about Johnson's relationships with women other than his wife, Eliza. Instead, Trefousse lets the facts paint their own unflattering portrait of one of history's least respected Presidents." In her 2011 survey of Johnson's life, Annette Gordon-Reed did not delve into the Harold story but did observe, "Throughout a good part of their near-five-decade marriage, Eliza was not a real presence in her husband's public life. There were rumors of infidelity on Andrew's part, which he denied, but they did not live together much as husband and wife." An illuminating primary source about the state of their marriage may be a letter written by a Confederate soldier charged with removing the Johnson family from occupied Tennessee; he wrote of Eliza, "She is very anxious to remain here with her children and is not at all desirous to go the bosom of 'Andy.'" In a 2001 article about Johnson's troubled son Robert Johnson, historian Paul Bergeron observed that the Johnson family was seemingly "marked by tension and possible antipathy between the parents."

== Early life and family ==
Emily Wright was born about May 29, 1820 in Tennessee. According to FamilySearch.org, her parents may have been John and Martha (Powell) Wright. According to newspaper reports at the time of her death, her mother was known as Mrs. Heiskell and lived in Rhea County.

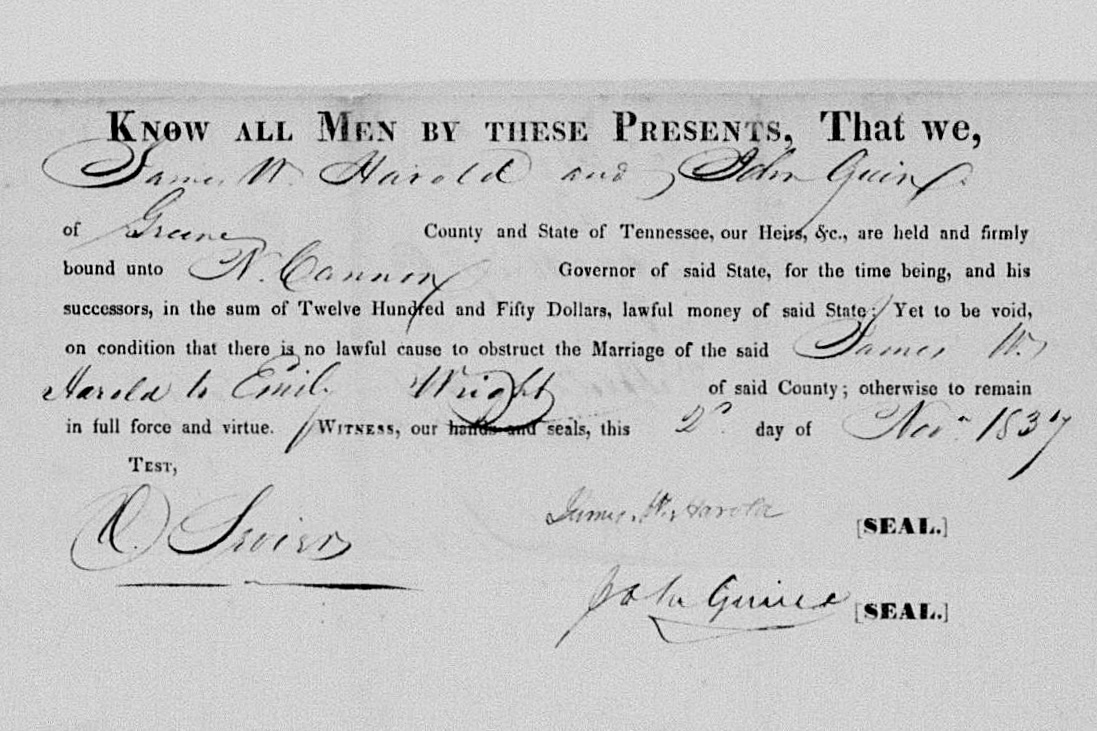
James W. Harold and Emily Wright marriage bond, November 2, 1837

Emily Wright married "Jas. W. Harrold" on November 2, 1837, in Greene County, Tennessee, when she was about 17 years old; James W. Harold was about five years her senior and had been born in Virginia. James W. Harold worked as a tailor in Greeneville in 1850, 1860, and 1870. They had four children who survived infancy:

- John W. Harold (born approximately 1838, when Emily was about 18), later studied law and served in the United States Army during the American Civil War.
- Mary E. Harold (born approximately 1846, when Emily was 26)
- Charles Harold (born 1856, when Emily was about 36)
- Jessie Harold (born 1863, when Emily was about 43)

James W. Harold was appointed postmaster of Greeneville beginning April 1, 1869. His annual salary for this work in 1871 was $690.

Mrs. Harold had been a member of the First Presbyterian Church (Greeneville, Tennessee) for more than 30 years and after her death was described by prominent citizens of Greeneville as "an earnest and consistent Christian, a chaste and faithful wife, a kind and dutiful mother, a charitable neighbor, and a true and noble woman, respected and esteemed by all in the community." She was said to have had the "entire confidence and deep love" of her husband.

== Scandal ==
After 50 years of unremarkable provincial life in East Tennessee, Mrs. James W. Harold became nationally infamous in 1872 for accusations that she was involved in an extramarital affair with former U.S. President Andrew Johnson. Johnson had nominally retired from politics following the end of his term of office, and had returned to Greeneville, Tennessee (the place where he had begun his career, where he owned a home and other real estate, and where his wife Eliza McCardle Johnson and daughter Martha Johnson Patterson usually lived). By 1872 Johnson was said to be bored with small-town life and was attempting to re-enter politics, despite a failed United States Senate bid in 1869.

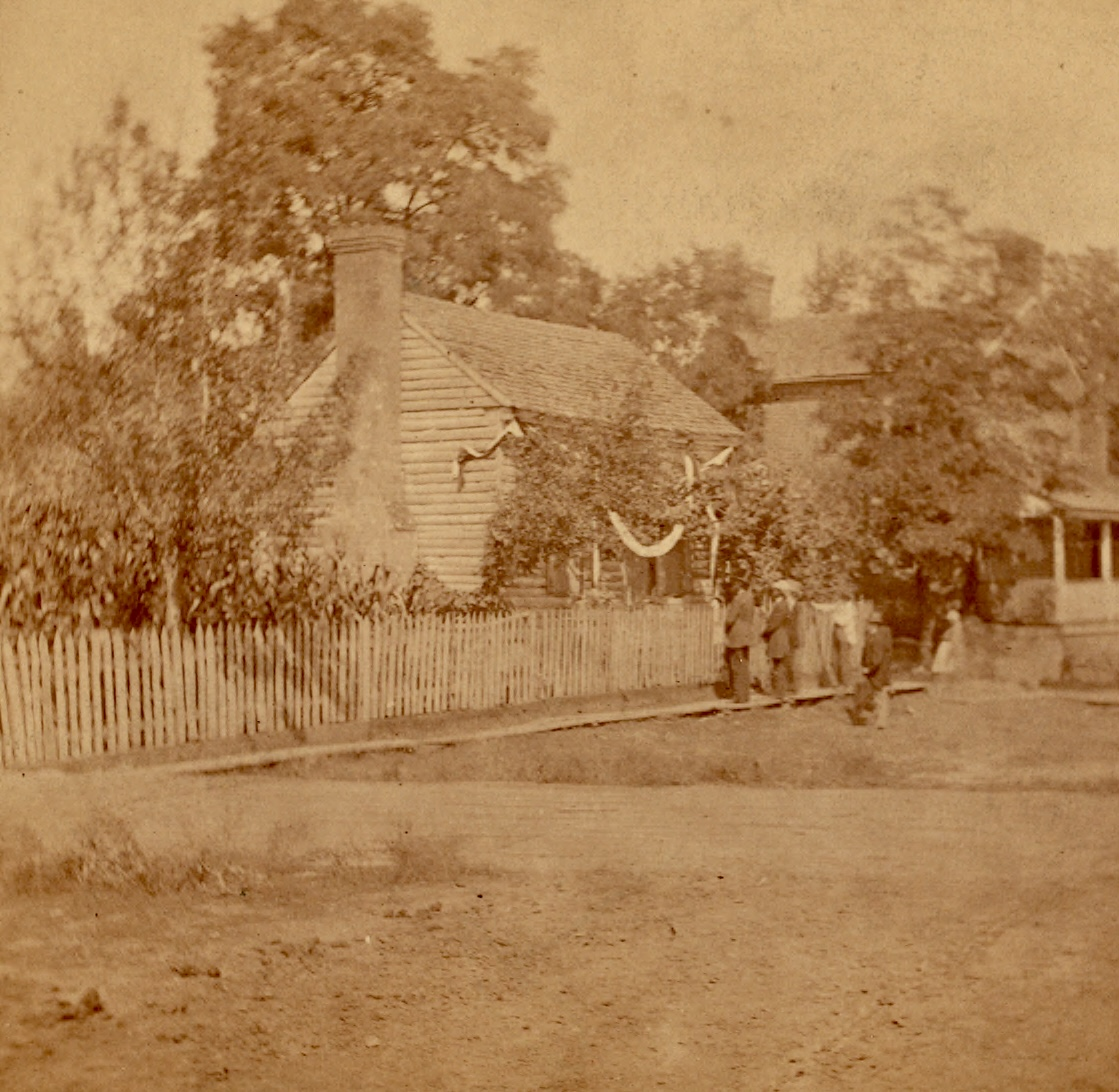
Andrew Johnson's old tailor shop in Greeneville: Originally published as a stereoscopic view, this photograph was taken by L.W. Keen in 1875

In any case, according to Knoxville newspaper accounts, one Sunday in late April 1872, the Greeneville town postmaster, a merchant and tailor named James W. Harold, received an anonymous letter that asserted that his wife of 35 years had been seduced by Johnson. By one telling, Andrew Johnson and Emily Harold had "had improper intercourse with each other for some time." Their assignations were said to take place in Johnson's library, which was adjacent to his old tailor shop, which was, in turn, adjacent to the home of the Harolds. The Johnsons and the Harolds lived "for many years past, within a few steps of each other." In addition to being neighbors, Harold and Johnson apparently had once been business partners during Johnson's tailoring days. According to one account, "Mr. Harold and Mr. Johnson had been personal and warm friends for more than 30 years." Emily Wright Harold was also said to have been a close friend of Johnson's wife, Eliza McCardle Johnson. It should perhaps be noted that in the 19th century U.S. South there was an "indeterminacy" between seduced and raped.

According to an 1865 description of Greeneville by Rev. Randall Ross of the 15th Ohio, "Up street [from the main Andrew Johnson house] stands his former tailor shop, with the old sign still on it; and in an old store-room up street is the remains of his library. At present it consists of law books and public documents, most of his more valuable books having been destroyed by the rebel soldiery." In 1878 at the time of the dedication of the Johnson monument at what is now Andrew Johnson National Cemetery a writer from Brooklyn reported, "His library after his return to Greeneville in 1868 [sic] was separate from the house and was a large lofty room filled with his papers and law-books. Here he spent a large portion of his time and particularly would he be found poring over some work or engaged in writing long after everybody in town was asleep."

Per a Knoxville paper, after receiving the letter Mr. Harold caught Mrs. Harold leaving the library "late at night" with a blanket shawl covering her head and face; she then attempted to slip into their home through the back door. There was reportedly a confrontation between the couple, who exchanged "high words," and their dispute was loud enough to be overheard. Months later neighbors testified under oath that they had neither seen nor heard anything that was suggestive of infidelity. Another version told in the same newspaper account states that Mr. Harold received the letter, showed it to his church-going wife and told her he disbelieved the accusations contained therein. Mrs. Harold was nonetheless said to be "so indignant she could hardly contain herself" and "almost crazy with excitement...with a gun in her hand, declaring she intended to shoot her traducers." As for the former president:

Mr. Johnson declared the lady had never been in his library. He said she had been a friend of Mrs. Johnson's for half a lifetime, but that he had not spoken to her for a week or at the time of the alleged visit to his library.

In all versions of the initial disclosure, the "idle gossips" of Greeneville (a town of about 3,000 people) both believe and spread "half a dozen or more" versions of the Harold–Johnson affair, and generally assign responsibility to Johnson. Harold is typically described as a victim of "seduction" and/or "atrocious calumny." The most pointed and public version, published in an Indianapolis newspaper 10 days after Harold's death, was entitled "Andy Johnson as Seducer" and claimed that "Great indignation is expressed among the citizens of Greeneville at the ex-President, and many of the best citizens refuse to speak to him on the street." By the end of May the story was widespread enough that, in a letter to Johnson, one Thomas W. Dick Bullock offered his sympathy in regard to the "base and malicious slander perpetrated by some designing persons".

Regarding Johnson's overall reputation in East Tennessee, and the claims and denials of "great indignation" in 1872, it may be germane that when Andrew Johnson returned to Greeneville three years prior (back in March 1869, after the end of his presidency), the mayor of Greeneville refused to participate in the welcome-home ceremony and procession. Per a newspaper report published March 21, 1869:

The entire affair passed off very successfully, and but one trivial incident occurred in the arrangement of the order of exercises...the Mayor of Greeneville peremptorily refused to participate in the ceremonies—making some absurd allegation that ex-President Johnson had gotten himself into an awkward predicament, or something to that effect, and he would have nothing to do with it, but would resign in favor of someone else. The Mayor's refusal was regarded as a piece of ill-mannered boorishness...and did not reflect the feelings of the citizens of Greeneville, who delight to honor men of Mr. Johnson's independence and patriotism.

— "Andrew Johnson's Return to Tennessee" in Republican Banner, March 21, 1869

== Suicide ==
As one thesis paper on Johnson's post-Presidential return to politics described events subsequent to the letter to James Harold, "Whether the accusation was true or not has not been established, but its venom was so damaging that Harold committed suicide." There is some conflict about the details, but according to most accounts, Emily Harold died early in the morning of May 8, 1872, in Sweetwater, Tennessee, while visiting her sickly mother, by a gunshot fired from a pistol that belonged to her son. The son, John W. Harold, was an U.S. Army officer described as a man of "high character and excellent traits." He was visiting his family on a leave of absence from the military and had been told nothing of rumors surrounding his parents and Andrew Johnson.

Initial accounts had it that Emily Harold's family heard three gunshots, and that she died from a shot to the heart and/or a chest wound. In these tellings, the top of her dress caught fire from proximity to the gunpowder and heat. Later newspaper accounts had it that she shot herself in the head. Emily Wright Harold was 51 years, 11 months, and nine days old at the time of her death.

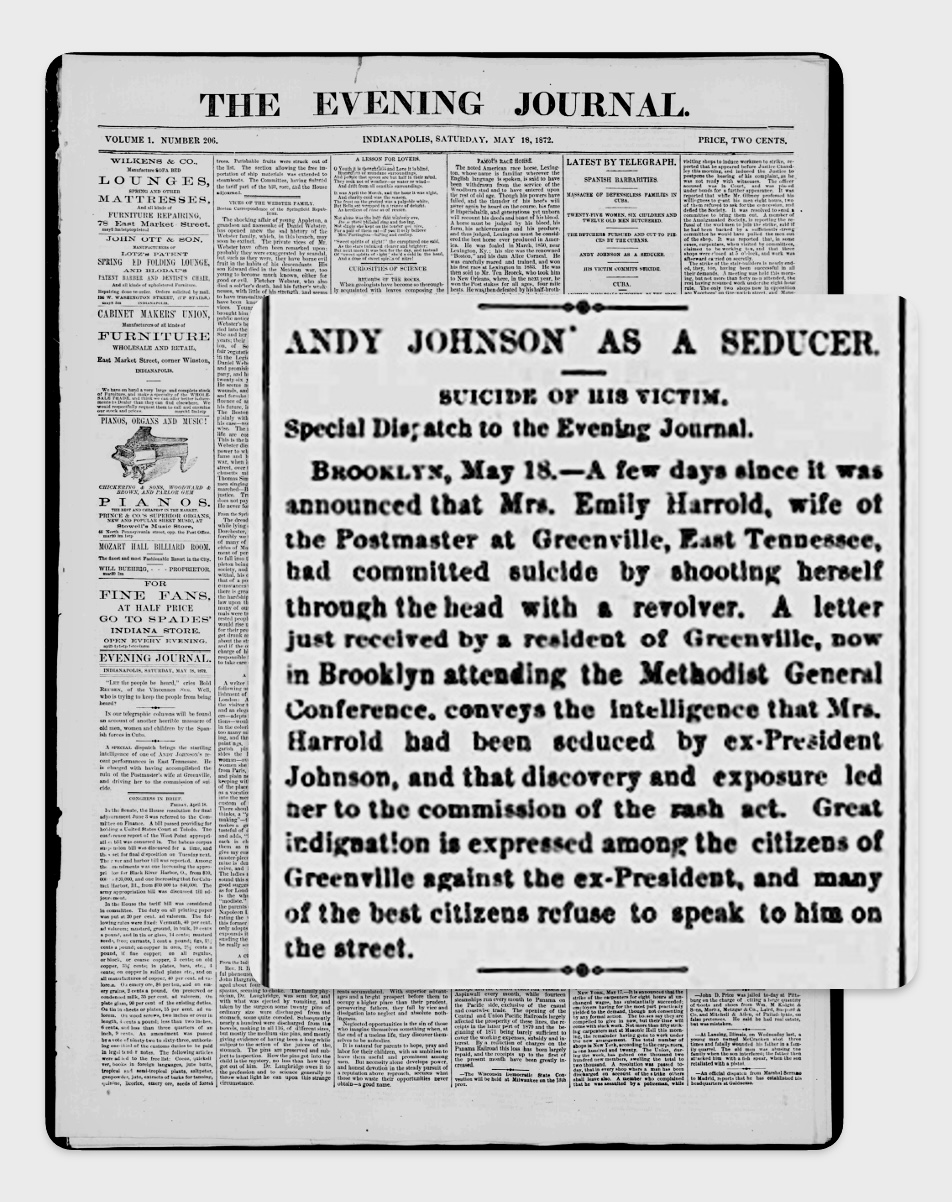
"Andy Johnson as Seducer, Suicide of His Victim". Indianapolis Journal. Vol. 1, no. 206. May 18, 1872. p. 1.

According to an extensive Knoxville newspaper report about the whole saga, her mother saw Emily Harold take her son's "small pistol" from his satchel; the mother presumed she was taking it to deliver to the son. Harold then went out into a "thicket" about 200 yd (180 m) beyond the house, from which three shots rang out. She was found to have shot herself through the heart and left breast. She was past saving when she was found; the first shot was thought to be the fatal one and her clothes were on fire when she was discovered. She was brought into the house but died therein, without speaking any last words. The son did not know why his mother had taken her own life until, at the funeral, Rev. S. V. McCorkle, the minister of the Greeneville Presbyterian church where Harold had worshipped for decades, "very justly and properly referred in severe language to the terrible lesson the event had afforded the idle slanderers who had brought about the trouble." The most widely distributed account of her death stated, "She was the wife of a warm friend of Johnson's and an exemplary Christian...the cruel and unfounded report of her seduction drove her to suicide in a moment of temporary insanity." This comment on the matter was printed in the New York Times, among other outlets. That the Times—noted to be a publication "hostile" to Johnson—declared it "cruel and unfounded" was considered a strong statement against the overall veracity of the infidelity accusations. Another newspaper wrote "in an hour of mental derangement with a burning consciousness of innocence and without power to resist the temptation she took her life." According to a widely republished post hoc report entitled "An Atrocious Calumny" that was devoted to absolving the parties of infidelity charges, and laying all blame on the "cold-blooded villain who invented the slander," the existence of the report had "fallen with crushing weight" on the "innocent heart" of Mrs. Harold.

"Men of prominence in both political parties" in Greeneville circulated a letter "unsolicited and without consulting either of the injured families" denouncing the infidelity report as false. One of the signatories, a lawyer and judge named H. H. Ingersoll, also wrote to the Indianapolis Journal with a point-by-point denial/refutation of the "Andy Johnson as Seducer" report. The men of prominence, all said to be citizens of Greeneville:

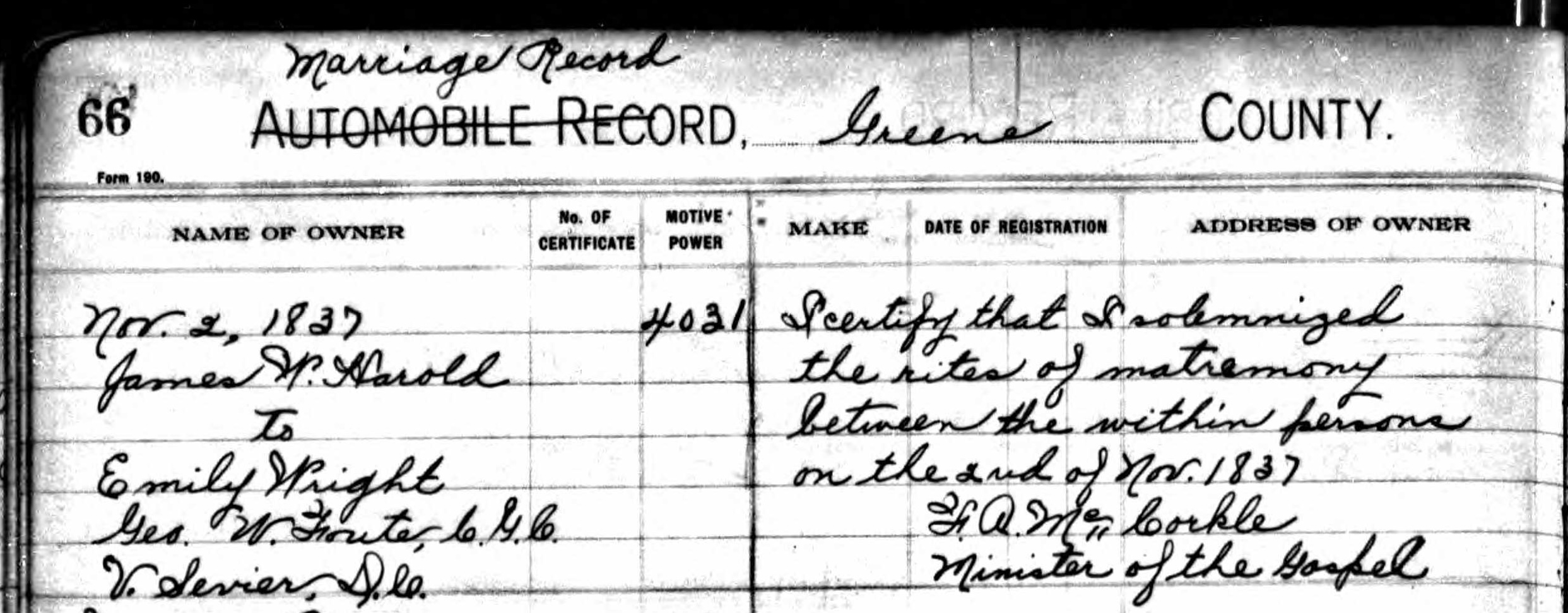
A 20th-century transcription of the Greene County marriage records shows that the Harold–Wright wedding ceremony was officiated by a McCorkle, and the marriage was recorded by Valentine Sevier, father of David Sevier

- D. R. Britton, Clerk, Circuit Court
- Jas. A. Galbraith, former Internal Revenue Collector
- Henry Hurlbert "H. H." Ingersoll, a lawyer
- Robert McCorkle
- S. V. McCorkle, First Presbyterian Church (Greeneville, Tennessee) § Clergy
- Robert M. McKee, a mayor of Greeneville
- Samuel Milligan, Judge U. S. Court of Claims
- Augustus Herman "A.H." Pettibone, assistant U. S. District Attorney
- A. M. Piper, deputy internal revenue collector
- Felix A. Reeve, attorney
- Elbert Clay "E.C." Reeves, editor of the Sentinel (Note: Reeves' son LeRoy Reeves designed the Tennessee state flag.)
- James H. Robinson, attorney
- Lewis F. Self, former Tennessee state senator
- David Sevier, "twenty-seven years C. & M." [Greene County Clerk & Master] (Note: David Deaderick Sevier was a grandnephew of Tennessee "founding father" John Sevier.)
- S. E. Snapp, a mayor of Greeneville
- A. W. Walker, Sheriff of Greene County

An account of Harold's death in a 21st-century online magazine found three shots to be a suspicious form of suicide and outlined the complexity of firing what was likely a Colt service revolver, perhaps the Colt Army Model 1860.

== State of Tennessee vs. R. C. Horn ==
In late July 1872, as Andrew Johnson was stumping through the state in hopes of winning a seat in the 1872–73 United States House of Representatives elections in Tennessee, Emily Harold's widower, James W. Harold, and his allies had dedicated themselves to identifying the author of the poison-pen letter that had initially triggered the crisis back in April. A man named R. C. Horn was brought before a panel of three magistrates in Greeneville and charged with libel. Horn was represented by four lawyers, who published a letter requesting a media blackout for the duration; "counsel for one party request that all publication of any matter prejudicial to the prosecution, or the defendant, or anyone implicated, be suspended till the conclusion of the trial. And then if the rights of either party should require it, a full and accurate transcript of the evidence in the case will be furnished for publication, Respectfully and truly, Felix A. Reeve, J. G. Deaderick, John Allison Jr., A. B Wilson, Counsel for the Defendants." Nonetheless, some scraps of news about the trial emerged: each side had four lawyers, and there were roughly 40 planned witnesses.

The defendant's name is R. C. Harne. The proof as to the handwriting of the anonymous letter was of a circumstantial character, and based partly on the opinion of experts who compared it with specimens of Harne's handwriting. But the evidence, as is usual before magistrates, was not kept pertinent to the issue. A wide range was taken, and a general investigation of the merits of the case gone into. The truth of the charges against Johnson and Mrs. Harold was investigated, and some swearing done, of rather a plain character, as is reported, by two negroes and a white man. Just what, they swore has not been made public, but it was of a sufficiently atrocious character to cause the arrest for perjury of all three of the witnesses. The trial proper and the trial for perjury promises to involve many residents of the place in the examination, and produce much bitterness and strife, and send a thousand stories traveling through the land. As a fresh complication, the parties arrested for perjury have sued their prosecutors for $10,000 damages. Harne has four lawyers, enough to sadly tangle any case...

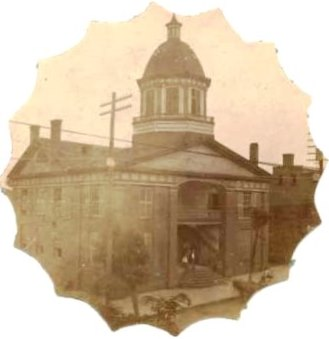
The State v. Horn trial was held at the original Greene County Courthouse building, which stood from the 1820s until 1916

Among the three men charged with perjury was James G. Haynes, "principal witness for the defense in the effort at justification," who was committed to jail on August 2. Haynes was a 40-year-old white resident of Greeneville; circa 1870 he lived with his aged father—both men listed their occupations as house carpenters—his wife Sarah, and his three children, Josephine, Landon and Cicero. (Note: Haynes was likely Presbyterian, like Emily Harold, because when he died on the Fourth of July 1873, he was buried at Shiloh Cumberland Presbyterian Church Cemetery in Tusculum, Greene County. Eliza and Martha Johnson were Methodists, while Andrew Johnson himself apparently fell somewhere between Baptist and unchurched.) Apparently this witness began some part of his testimony with a 10-minute-long extemporaneous speech "in which he explained his position generally in regard to the parties, the case and his conduct regarding process of attachment, and hiding in the woods." The two unnamed "colored witnesses," apparently, "as soon as they were deposed and before a warrant could be executed, evaded the officers and fled toward North Carolina." On August 8, it was reported that "the witness arrested for perjury...sued his prosecutor for damages for false imprisonment. The defense have closed their testimony on justification, and are now endeavoring to shift the authorship of the libel."

Horn was acquitted. Per a Nashville newspaper account, "The examination was long and exciting and to a great extent went into the merits of the case. The case was heard by three magistrates and their judgment was that the proof was not sufficient to show that Harne had written the anonymous letter. Their opinion as we understand does not reach the truth or falsity of the charges against Mrs. Harold, but simply go to the question of the author of the libel."

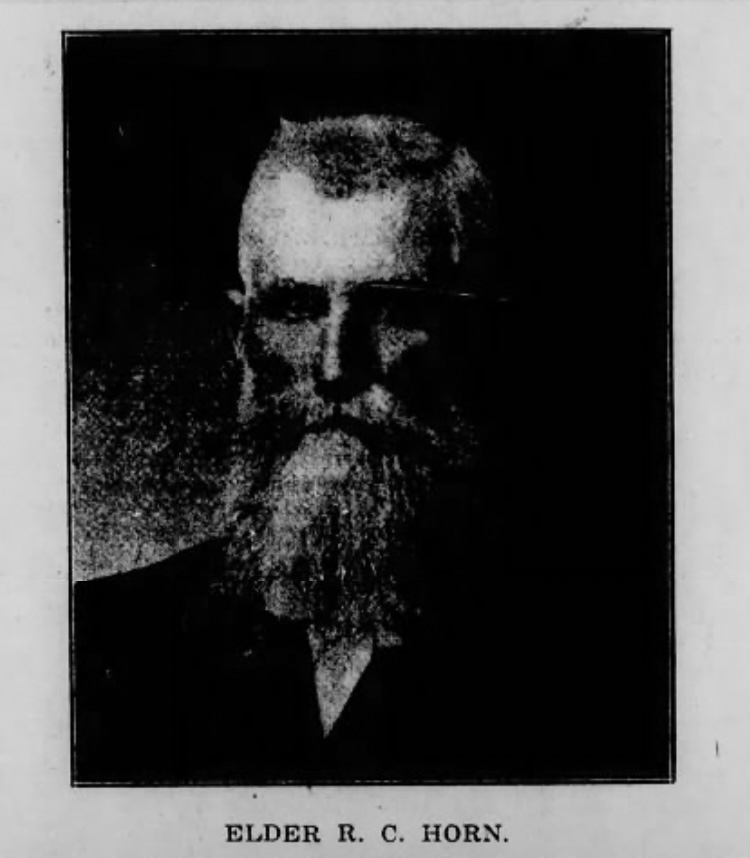
Photograph of Elder R. C. Horn published in a Texas newspaper in 1912

The man accused of libel may have been Robert Cannon Horn, a preacher and defeated Confederate. Horn, who had been married in Trousdale County, Tennessee, in 1870, and worked as a minister around Hartsville, Tennessee in 1871, had moved to Texas in the second half of that year. Horn's daughter Mrs. John W. Thomas ended up living in Greeneville, Tennessee, sometime in the late 19th or early 20th century.

== Aftermath ==
Andrew Johnson seemingly referenced Emily Harold in a speech he made in Brownsville, Tennessee, on October 17, 1872, eliding her as a Mrs. Somebody Else: "You have heard a great deal said about Mrs. Surratt, and about Mrs. Somebody else..." In this formulation, Johnson aligns her with an innkeeper who had been convicted of conspiring to assassinate Abraham Lincoln and subsequently hanged, suggesting that he was unfairly accused of wronging both women. (The question of whether Johnson had unjustly condemned Mary Surratt in 1865 without reviewing the evidence against her or reasonably considering her pleas for clemency was debated for the duration of Johnson's life and career.) Johnson suffered a punishing defeat in the November 5, 1872 balloting for the state's at-large seat in the House, placing third of three behind Radical Republican Congressman Horace Maynard and Democratic candidate and former Confederate general Benjamin F. Cheatham, despite "crisscrossing Tennessee employing the stump-speaking style that had catapulted him to national office many years before." As a practical matter, Johnson's candidacy—and his grandstanding speeches railing against what he claimed was an ex-Confederate-military cabal attempting to dominate the state—had weakened the Democratic position, "broke the power of the Cheatham Ring and the Bourbon Democrats," and swung the election to Maynard. Per Gordon-Reed, despite the loss he "did himself enough good that he and his supporters felt this was a real step toward eventual electoral success." (Note: Johnson had previously lost a Senate bid in 1869, immediately following the end of his Presidency, and would narrowly regain a Senate seat in 1875, but, after having appeared in the chamber just once, Johnson died at age 66 after experiencing multiple strokes at his daughter's home in Elizabethton.)

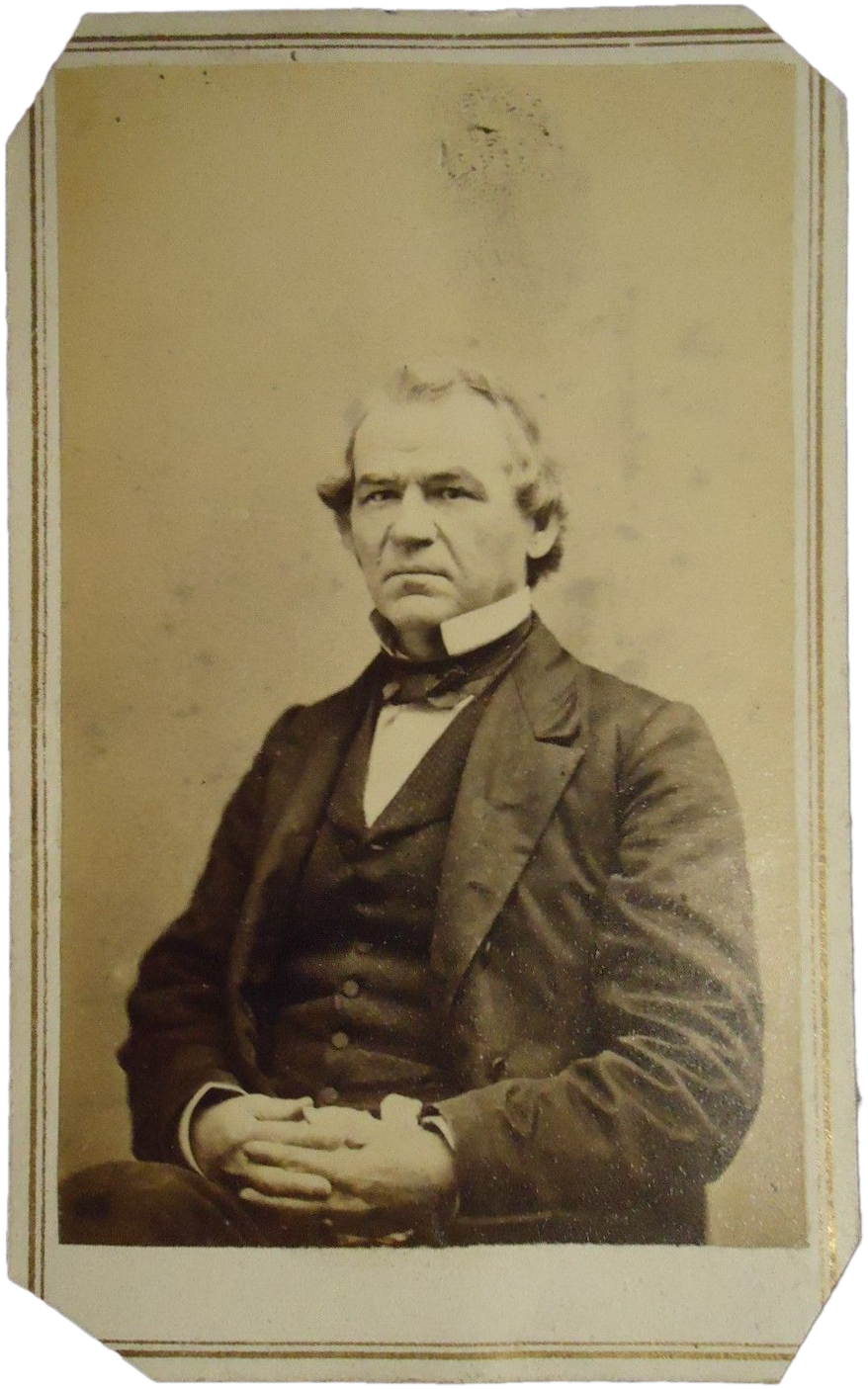
Carte de visite of Andrew Johnson, made in Nashville around 1864, when he was military governor of Tennessee

In 1873, James W. Harold requested compensation from the Southern Claims Commission for 50 locustwood fence rails and 15 cords of firewood that he stated were taken from him by Gen. F. J. Woods, Hospital Division, in April 1865. He testified that he had remained loyal to the Union and voted against secession. The firewood-and-fence-rails compensation claim was denied by the commission. James W. Harold (born February 8, 1815) died April 20, 1873, less than a year after the death of his wife. He prepared a will the month before he died, naming his oldest son John executor, and legal guardian of his minor children, Charles Harold, age 17, and Jessie Harold, age 10. Emily Wright Harold, James W. Harold, and their daughter Mary E. Harold (who had died at about age nine in 1855), are buried together in a family plot at Old Harmony Graveyard, Greeneville's historic Presbyterian cemetery.

Andrew Johnson died in 1875; his wife Eliza McCardle Johnson died in 1876. Both are buried at the top of a hill in the Johnson family burial ground at what is now Andrew Johnson National Cemetery. John W. Harold served in the U.S. Army until his death in 1879; he left a two-thirds of his personal estate to his brother Charles and one-third to his sister Jessie. Charles Harold moved to New York City where he lived, married in 1881, worked, and died in the Bronx in 1940. Jessie Caldwell moved to Montana where she lived, married in 1884, and raised several children. She died in Corvallis, Oregon in 1941.

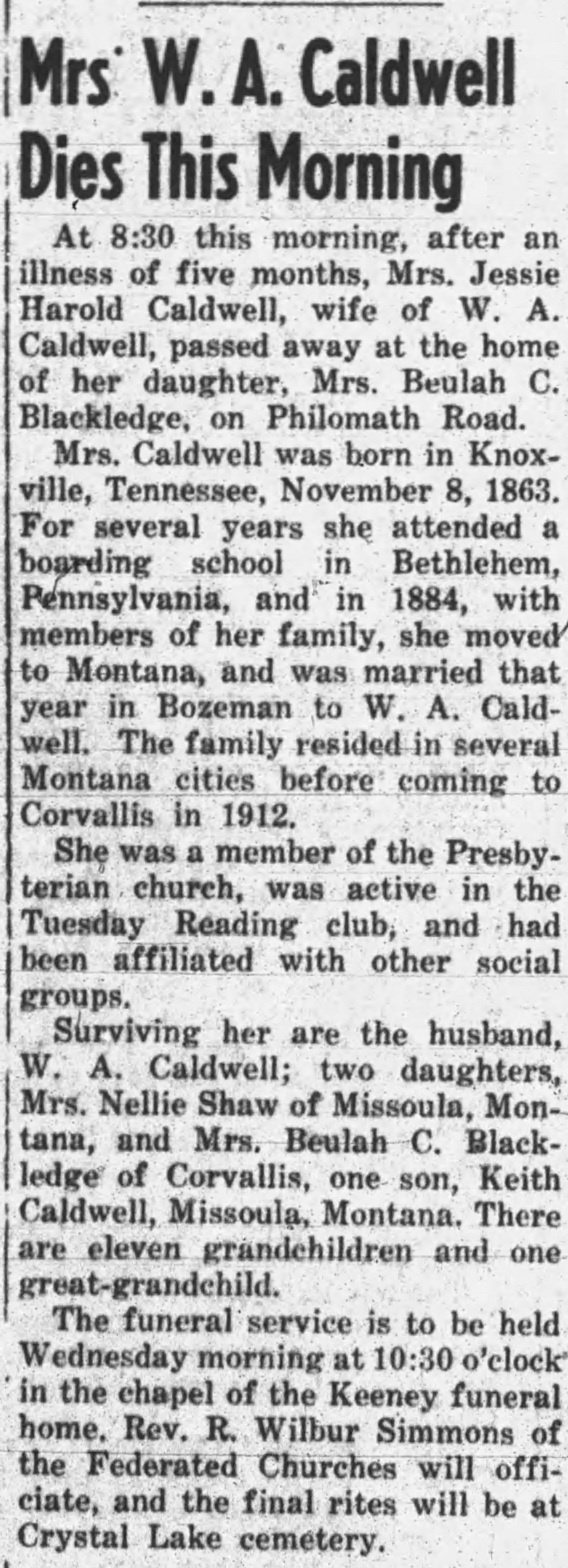
Emily Harold's youngest child died in 1941 at age 78

In 1891, almost 20 years after the 1872 scandal, someone by the name of M. V. Moore wrote a scathing retrospective biography of Andrew Johnson that was published in the Philadelphia Weekly Times and reprinted in the Memphis Public Ledger. The tale of Mrs. Harold resurfaced and Moore wrote that the neighbors even charged the late Andrew Johnson "with violating the chastity of his neighbor's wife":

A stranger visiting Greeneville, Tenn., the old home of Mr. Johnson, and investigating facts, will be surprised to find in what open and pronounced detestation the morals and memory of the man are held there. I knew Mr. Johnson personally quite well for a number of years; but in the meantime I had imbibed many of the popular delusions about him, and I had kept so aloof from discussion of his private life that I was not at all prepared to hear and believe all that has been told to me during a recent sojourn of a few days in Greeneville and surrounding neighborhood since Johnson's death. One soon learns that the man had no regard whatever for morality or religion. He is even charged with violating the chastity of his neighbor's wife. A notorious instance was cited where the victim was the wife of a life-long friend and co-laborer in politics. When the vile and painful slander became publicly known, the woman, in the endeavor to escape the disgrace and shame brought to her own household, ended her career in a sudden and horrible suicide. But her seducer, the distinguished man, appeared utterly indifferent to the shameful and tragic events which produced a profound and shocking sensation in East Tennessee, where the parties are known.

== See also ==
- Dolly Johnson – Formerly enslaved Tennessean (1820s–1890s)
- Greeneville Historic District (Greeneville, Tennessee)
- Bibliography of Andrew Johnson
