= Bibliography of Andrew Johnson =

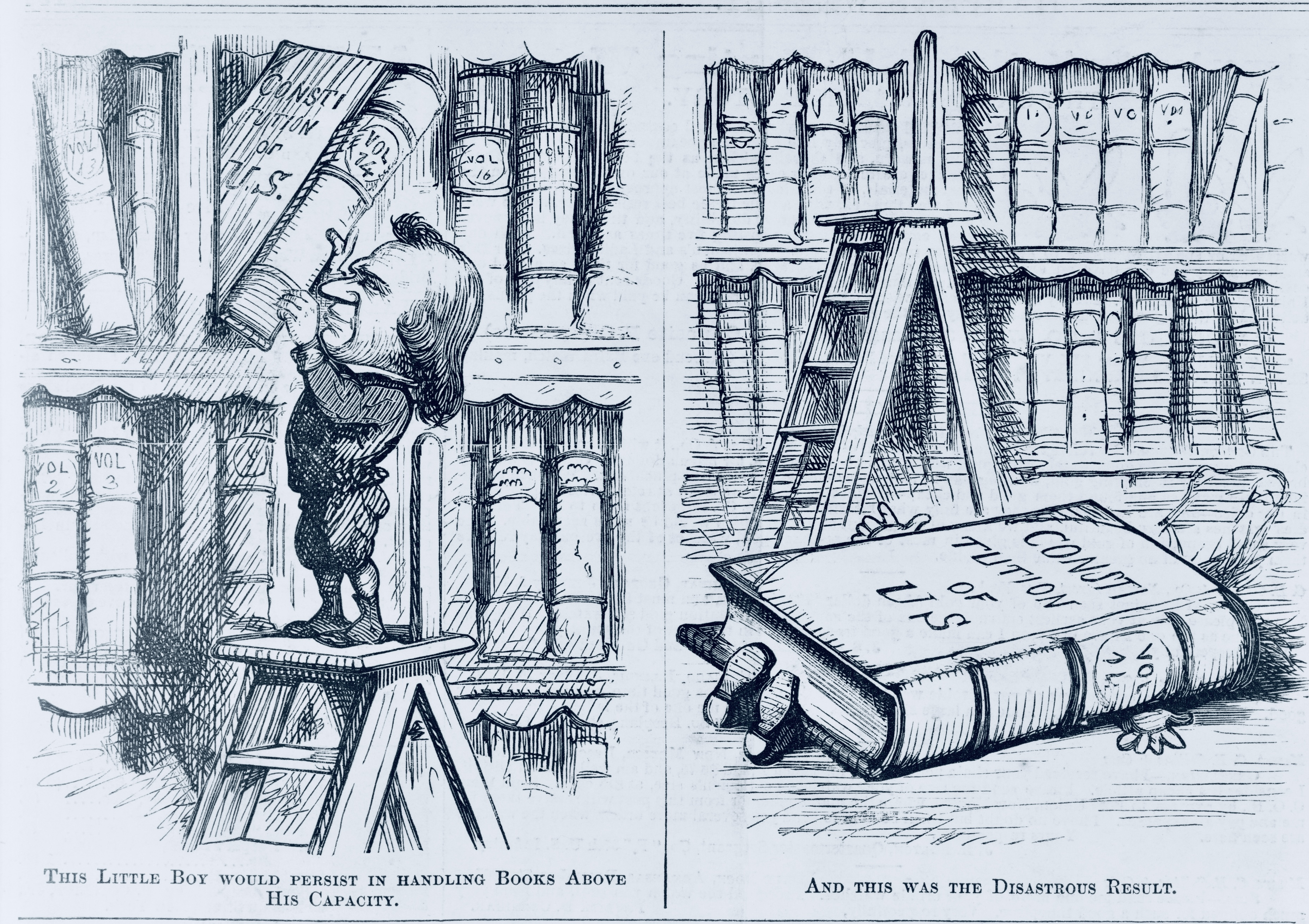
Thomas Nast, Harper's Weekly, 1868

This bibliography of Andrew Johnson is a list of major works about Andrew Johnson, the 17th president of the United States.

== Major ==
- Castel, Albert E. (1979). The Presidency of Andrew Johnson. University Press of Kansas. ISBN 9780700601905.
- Gordon-Reed, Annette (2011). Andrew Johnson. Times Books. ISBN 978-0805069488.
- McKitrick, Eric L. (1960). Andrew Johnson and Reconstruction. University of Chicago Press. LCCN 60005467. OCLC 1476846.
- Trefousse, Hans L. (1989). Andrew Johnson: A Biography. W.W. Norton & Company. ISBN 0393026736. LCCN 88028295.

== Scholarly and popular studies ==
- Benedict, Michael Les. The Impeachment and Trial of Andrew Johnson (1999). ISBN 0-393-31982-2
- Boulard, Garry. The Swing Around the Circle—Andrew Johnson and the Train Ride that Destroyed a Presidency (2008) ISBN 978-1-4401-0239-4
- Bowen, David Warren (1989). Andrew Johnson and the Negro. Knoxville: University of Tennessee Press. ISBN 0-87049-584-4.
- Brabson, Fay Warrington (1972). Andrew Johnson: a life in pursuit of the right course, 1808–1875: the seventeenth President of the United States. Durham, N.C.: Seeman Printery. LCCN 77151079. OCLC 590545. OL 4578789M.
- Broomall, James J. "Ulysses S. Grant Goes to Washington: The Commanding General as Secretary of War." in A Companion to the Reconstruction Presidents 1865–1881 (2014) pp: 214-234.
- Castel, Albert E. "Andrew Johnson". In Graff, Henry (ed.). The Presidents: A Reference History (7th ed. 2002). pp. 225–239
- Cimprich, John (2012) [1985]. Slavery's End in Tennessee. University of Alabama Press. ISBN 9780817380830.
- Cox, LaWanda C. and John Henry Cox. Politics, principle, and prejudice, 1865-1866: dilemma of Reconstruction America (Free Press, 1963).
- Foner, Eric. Reconstruction: America's Unfinished Revolution (HarperCollins, 1988), a major scholarly survey; also in an abridged edition.
- Fuentes-Rohwer, Luis. "The Impeachment of Andrew Johnson." in A Companion to the Reconstruction Presidents 1865–1881 (2014): 62-84.
- Hatfield, Mark O.; with the Senate Historical Office (1997). Vice Presidents of the United States, 1789-1993 (PDF). Washington: U.S. Govt. Printing Office. pp. 213–219., popular
- Kennedy, John F. Profiles in Courage (Harper & Brothers, 1956), popular
- Levine, Robert S. The Failed Promise: Reconstruction, Frederick Douglass, and the Impeachment of Andrew Johnson (2021) excerpt
- Maslowski, Peter (1978). Treason Must Be Made Odious: Military Occupation and Wartime Reconstruction in Nashville, Tennessee, 1862–65. Millwood, N.Y: KTO Press. ISBN 978-0-527-62185-8. LCCN 78016799. OCLC 4004346.
- Mantell, Martin E. Johnson, Grant, and the Politics of Reconstruction (1973)
- Means, Howard. The Avenger Takes His Place: Andrew Johnson and the 45 Days That Changed the Nation. (Houghton Mifflin Harcourt, 2006)
- Orr, Robert (2005). President Andrew Johnson of Greeneville, Tennessee. Knoxville: Tennessee Valley Publishing. ISBN 9781932604153.
- Schroeder-Lein, Glenna R.; Zuczek, Richard (2001). Andrew Johnson: a biographical companion. ABC-CLIO biographical companions. Santa Barbara, Calif.: ABC-CLIO. ISBN 978-1-57607-030-7.
- Simpson, Brooks D. (1991). Let Us Have Peace: Ulysses S. Grant and the Politics of War and Reconstruction, 1861–1868. Chapel Hill, North Carolina: University of North Carolina Press. ISBN 9780700608966.
- Sledge, James L. III. "Johnson, Andrew," in Encyclopedia of the American Civil War. edited by David S. Heidler and Jeanne T. Heidler. (2000)
- Stewart, David O. Impeached: The Trial of President Andrew Johnson and the Fight for Lincoln's Legacy. (Simon & Schuster, 2009)
- Van Deusen, Glyndon. William Henry Seward (Oxford University Press, 1967), the Secretary of State.
- Wineapple, Brenda. The Impeachers: The Trial of Andrew Johnson and the Dream of a Just Nation. New York: Random House (2019).
- Zuczek, Richard. "Foreign Affairs and Andrew Johnson." in A Companion to the Reconstruction Presidents 1865–1881 (2014): 85-120.

== Journal articles ==
- Bailey, Thomas A. (1934). "Why the United States Purchased Alaska". Pacific Historical Review. 3 (1): 39–49. doi:10.2307/3633456. JSTOR 3633456.
- Fehrenbacher, Don E. "The making of a myth: Lincoln and the vice-presidential nomination in 1864." Civil War History 41.4 (1995): 273-290.
- Harris, William C. "Andrew Johnson's First 'Swing Around the Circle': His Northern Campaign of 1863." Civil War History 35.2 (1989): 153-171. excerpt
- Rothera, Evan (2020-01-27). ""Moses in Retirement": Andrew Johnson, 1869-1876". The Gettysburg Historical Journal. 7 (1). ISSN 2327-3917.
- Swanson, Ryan A. "Andrew Johnson and His Governors: An Examination of Failed Reconstruction Leadership." Tennessee Historical Quarterly 71.1 (2012): 16-45. online
- Rable, George C. (1973). "Anatomy of a Unionist: Andrew Johnson in the Secession Crisis". Tennessee Historical Quarterly. 32 (4): 332–354. JSTOR 42623407.
- Trefousse, Hans L. (1977). "Andrew Johnson and the Failure of Reconstruction". In Trefousse, Hans L. (ed.). Toward a new view of America: essays in honor of Arthur C. Cole. New York: Burt Franklin & Co. pp. 135–150. ISBN 978-0-89102-066-0. LCCN 76049063. OCLC 2543048.

== Older studies ==
- Beale, Howard K. The Critical Year. A Study of Andrew Johnson and Reconstruction (1930). ISBN 0-8044-1085-2
- DeWitt, D. M. The Impeachment and Trial of Andrew Johnson (1903).
- DuBois, W.E.B. (1935). "Transubstantiation of a Poor White". Black Reconstruction: An Essay Toward a History of the Part Which Black Folk Played in the Attempt to Reconstruct Democracy in America, 1860-1888. New York: Russell & Russell – via Internet Archive.
- Dunning, W. A. Essays on the Civil War and Reconstruction (New York, 1898) [OUTDATED]
- Dunning, W. A. Reconstruction, Political and Economic (New York, 1907) [OUTDATED]
- Hall, Clifton Rumery (1916). Andrew Johnson, military governor of Tennessee. Princeton: Princeton University Press. LCCN 16021420. OCLC 739980. OL 6591007M.
- Milton, George Fort (1930). The Age of Hate: Andrew Johnson and the Radicals. [OUTDATED]
- Patton, James Welch. Unionism and Reconstruction in Tennessee, 1860–1869 (1934)
- Rhodes, James Ford. History of the United States from the Compromise of 1850 to the McKinley-Bryan Campaign of 1896 Volume: 6. 1920. Pulitzer Prize.
- Schouler, James. History of the United States of America: Under the Constitution vol. 7. 1865–1877. The Reconstruction Period (1917)
- Sioussat, St. George L. (1918). Andrew Johnson and the early phases of the homestead bill. Iowa: Mississippi Valley Historical Association.
- Stryker, Lloyd P. Andrew Johnson: A Study in Courage (1929). ISBN 0-403-01231-7 [OUTDATED]
- Winston, Robert W. Andrew Johnson: Plebeian and Patriot (1928) [OUTDATED]

== Historiography ==
- Beale, Howard K. "On Rewriting Reconstruction History." American Historical Review 45 (July 1940):807-27.
- Benedict, Michael Les. "A New Look at the Impeachment of Andrew Johnson." Political Science Quarterly 88 (September 1973) pp:349-67.
- Brown, Thomas J. Reconstructions: New Perspectives on the Postbellum United States (Oxford University Press. 2006)
- Calhoun, Charles, et al. "Historians’ Forum: Reconstruction." Civil War History 61.3 (2015): 281-301.
- Castel, Albert. "Andrew Johnson: His Historiographical Rise and Fall." Mid-America 45 (July 1963):175-84.
- Cox, John H., and Cox, LaWanda. "Negro Suffrage and GOP Politics: The Problems of Motivation in Reconstruction Historiography." Journal of Southern History 33 (August 1967):303-30.
- Curry, Richard 0. "The Civil War and Reconstruction, 1861-1877: A Critical Overview of Recent Trends and Interpretations." Civil War History 20 (September 1974):215-38.
- Frantz, Edward O. (2014). A Companion to the Reconstruction Presidents, 1865 - 1881. Wiley-Blackwell. ISBN 978-1444339284.
- Foner, Eric. The Dunning School: Historians, Race, and the Meaning of Reconstruction (University Press of Kentucky, 2013).
- Kincaid, Larry. "Victims of Circumstance: An Interpretation of Changing Attitudes Toward Republican Policy Makers and Reconstruction." Journal of American History 52 (June 1970):48-66.
- Lenihan, Mary Ruth Logan (1986). Reputation and history: Andrew Johnson's historiographical rise and fall (Master of Arts thesis). University of Montana. ProQuest EP36186.
- Miller, Zachary A. (August 2022). False Idol: The Memory of Andrew Johnson and Reconstruction in Greeneville, Tennessee 1869–2022 (Master of Arts thesis). Eastern Tennessee State University. Paper 4096.
- Notaro, Carmen Anthony. "History of the Biographic Treatment of Andrew Johnson in the Twentieth Century." Tennessee Historical Quarterly 24.2 (1965): 143-155. online
- Parfait, Claire. "Reconstruction Reconsidered: A Historiography of Reconstruction, From the Late Nineteenth Century to the 1960s." Études anglaises 4 (2009): 440-454. online
- Prior, David. Between Freedom and Progress: The Lost World of Reconstruction Politics (LSU Press, 2019).
- Sefton, James E. "The Impeachment of Andrew Johnson: A Century of Writing." Civil War History 14 (June 1968):120-47.
- Thomas, Brook. "The unfinished task of grounding reconstruction's promise." Journal of the Civil War Era 7.1 (2017): 16-38.
- Weisberger, Bernard A. "The Dark and Bloody Ground of Reconstruction Historiography." Journal of Southern History 25 (November 1959):427-47.

== Unpublished dissertations and theses ==
These are online at academic libraries.

- Bowen, David Warren. "Andrew Johnson and the Negro." (University of Tennessee; Proquest Dissertations Publishing, 1976. ProQuest 7710753 – published 1989 by University of Tennessee Press ISBN 978-0870495847
- Hager, Paul Alcott. "Andrew Johnson Of East Tennessee." (Johns Hopkins University; Proquest Dissertations Publishing, 1975. ProQuest 7821961; detailed biography from birth to 1863.
- Halperin, Bernard Seymour. "Andrew Johnson, The Radicals, and the Negro, 1865-1866" (Florida State University; ProQuest Dissertations Publishing, 1966. ProQuest 6708569.
- Hardison, Edwin T. "In the Toils of War: Andrew Johnson and the Federal Occupation of Tennessee, 1862-1865" (University of Tennessee; Proquest Dissertations Publishing, 1981. ProQuest 8208968.
- Hayes, Merwyn Alfred. "The Andrew Johnson Impeachment Trial: A Case Study in Argumentation" (University of Illinois at Urbana-Champaign; ProQuest Dissertations Publishing, 1966. ProQuest 6607749.
- McGuire, Tom. "Andrew Johnson and the northern revolution" (PhD thesis, Columbia University; ProQuest Dissertations Publishing, 2007. ProQuest 3266640, on his battles with Radical Republicans.
- O'Brien, John J., III. "The Mechanic Statesman and the Military Chieftain: Andrew Johnson, William B. Campbell and the Meaning of Liberty and Union in Antebellum Tennessee" (Saint Louis University ProQuest Dissertations Publishing, 2017. ProQuest 10277975.
- Ortiz-Garcia, Angel Luis. "Andrew Johnson's Veto of the First Reconstruction Act" (Carnegie Mellon University; Proquest Dissertations Publishing, 1970. ProQuest 7119112.
- Crawford, Aaron Scott (2002-05-02). The Resurrection of Andrew Johnson: His Return to Tennessee Politics (PDF) (Master of Arts thesis). Blacksburg, Virginia: Virginia Polytechnic Institute and State University Department of History.
- Wedge, Lucius. "Andrew Johnson and the ministers of Nashville: A study in the relationship between war, politics, and morality" (University of Akron, ProQuest Dissertations Publishing, 2013. ProQuest 3671127.

== Primary sources ==
- Papers of Andrew Johnson (16 volumes, U of Tennessee Press) listing of published volumes
  - vol 10 online 1866
- "Johnson, Andrew Papers (1846-1875)" finding aid to manuscripts at Tennessee State Library and Archives.
  - Governor Andrew Johnson (1808-1875) Papers 1853-1857 (1846-1875) (PDF), Nashville, Tennessee: Tennessee State Library and Archives, archived from the original (PDF) on 2013-07-22
  - Papers of (Military) Governor Andrew Johnson 1862–1865 (PDF), Nashville, Tennessee: Tennessee State Library and Archives, archived from the original (PDF) on 2013-07-21
- Johnson, Andrew; Moore, Frank (1865). Speeches of Andrew Johnson, President of the United States. Boston: Little, Brown, and Company.

== Family and character qualities ==
- Barber, James D. (1968). "Adult Identity and Presidential Style: The Rhetorical Emphasis". Daedalus. 97 (3): 938–968. ISSN 0011-5266.
- Bergeron, Paul H. (2001). "Robert Johnson: The President's Troubled and Troubling Son". Journal of East Tennessee History. 73. Knoxville, TN: East Tennessee Historical Society: 1–22. ISSN 1058-2126. OCLC 760067571.
- Browne, Stephen Howard (2008). "Andrew Johnson and the Politics of Character". In Medhurst, Martin J. (ed.). Before the Rhetorical Presidency. College Station: Texas A&M University Press. pp. 194–212. ISBN 978-1-60344-626-6 – via Project MUSE.
- DeWitt, John H. (1968). "Andrew Johnson and the Hermit". Tennessee Historical Quarterly. 27 (1): 50–61. ISSN 0040-3261.
- Holloway, Laura C. (1871). "Eliza Johnson, Martha Patterson, Mary Stover". The Ladies of the White House. New York: United States Pub. Co. pp. 584–649. LCCN 04013417. OCLC 681133673. OL 13503123M – via HathiTrust (New York Public Library copy).
- Lawing, Hugh A. (1961). "Andrew Johnson National Monument". Tennessee Historical Quarterly. 20 (2): 103–119. ISSN 0040-3261. JSTOR 42621527.
- Muir, Andrew Forest (1956). "William P. Johnson, Southern Proletarian and Unionist". Tennessee Historical Quarterly. 15 (4): 330–338. ISSN 0040-3261. JSTOR 42621309.

== Selected newspaper and magazine articles ==
- Moore, John Trotwood (1929-03-30). "Andrew Johnson—The Rail-Splitter's Running Mate". Saturday Evening Post. Vol. 201, no. 39. pp. 24–25, 162, 165, 166, 169. [OUTDATED]

== See also ==
- List of bibliographies of U.S. presidents
- List of bibliographies on American history
