= George Fort Milton Sr. =

American newspaper editor (1869–1924)

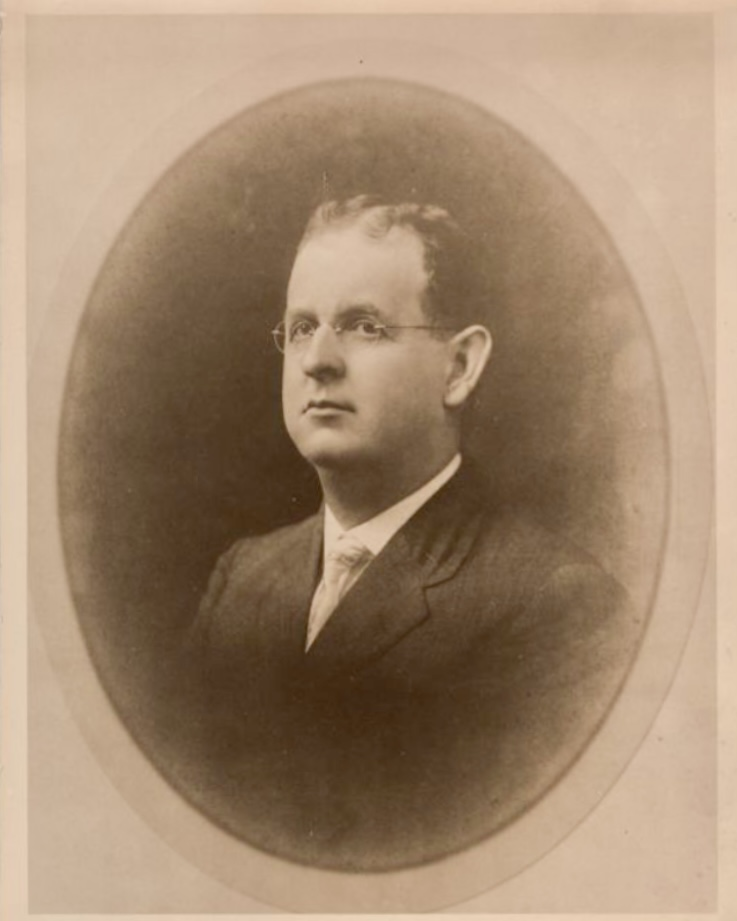
George Fort Milton Sr. (Chattanooga Public Library ACC 295–01–439)

George Fort Milton Sr. (July 16, 1869 – April 23, 1924) was an American social reformer and newspaper editor in Tennessee. Born to a doctor and former Confederate Army surgeon from Alabama, Milton served in the U.S. Army during the Spanish–American War. Milton acquired the Chattanooga News from Jerome Pound in 1910 and used it as an outlet for his liberal views. His second wife, suffragist Abby Crawford Milton, and son George Fort Milton Jr. ran the Chattanooga News after Milton Sr.'s sudden death in 1924, until Milton Jr. bought out his stepmother's share for $350,000 in 1928.
