= Michael Les Benedict =

American historian

Michael Les Benedict is an American historian, who taught at Ohio State University from 1970 until his retirement in 2005. He received his B.A. and M.A. degrees from the University of Illinois and his PhD from Rice University. His expertise is principally in constitutional and legal history, civil rights and civil liberties, and the American Civil War and Reconstruction. Benedict brings a political science approach to his analysis of historical events. Benedict has contributed several works to the field of Civil War and Reconstruction studies including The Impeachment and Trial of Andrew Johnson (1973), A Compromise of Principle: Congressional Republicans and Reconstruction, 1863-1869 (1975), Fruits of Victory: Alternatives in Restoring the Union, 1865-1877 (1986), and, more recently, Preserving the Constitution: Essays on Politics and the Constitution in the Reconstruction Era (2006).

== Works ==
- Benedict, Michael Les, The Impeachment and Trial of Andrew Johnson (1973)
- Benedict, Michael Les, A Compromise of Principle: Congressional Republicans and Reconstruction (1975)
- Benedict, Michael Les, The Blessings of Liberty (1996, rev. ed. 2005)
- Benedict, Michael Les, Preserving the Constitution: Essays on Politics and the Constitution in the Reconstruction Era (2006)
- Benedict, Michael Les, Sources in American Constitutional History (1996) a companion volume
- Benedict, Michael Les, The Fruits of Victory: Alternatives in Restoring the Union, 1865-1877 (1975, rev. ed. 1986). A reader in Reconstruction History
- Benedict, Michael Les, American Historical Association's bicentennial essay on the history of American civil liberty, Civil Rights and Liberties (1987)
- Benedict, Michael Les, co-editor The History of Ohio Law (2004).
- Benedict, Michael Les (2011). "Constitutional politics, constitutional law, and the Thirteenth Amendment". Maryland Law Review. 71 (1). University of Maryland School of Law: 163–188. Pdf.
