= Inauguration of Ulysses S. Grant =

Inauguration of Ulysses S. Grant may refer to:

- First inauguration of Ulysses S. Grant, 1869
- Second inauguration of Ulysses S. Grant, 1873

== See also ==
- The full text of Ulysses S. Grant's First Inaugural Address at Wikisource
- The full text of Ulysses S. Grant's Second Inaugural Address at Wikisource
