= George Fort Milton Jr. =

U.S. historian and newspaperman (1894–1955)

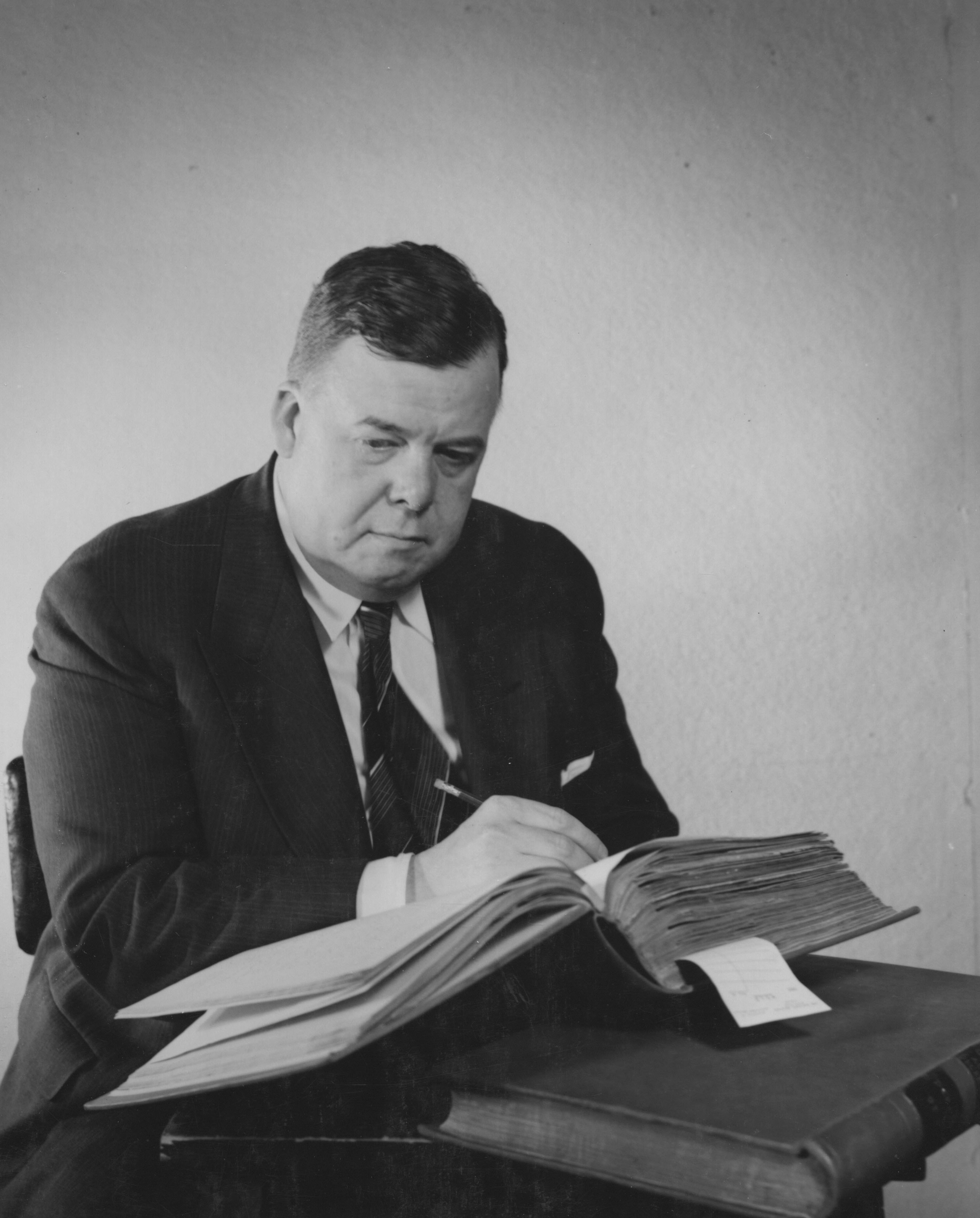
- George Fort Milton, 1942 (NAID 12168988)
- Born: November 19, 1894
- Died: November 12, 1955 (aged 60)
- Occupations: Historian, editor, reporter, reformer, U.S. government official, U.S. Army lieutenant

George Fort Milton Jr. (November 19, 1894 – November 12, 1955) was an American newspaper editor, and author of several histories of the 19th-century United States. He never used the suffix "Jr." in his own lifetime but it is often applied retroactively to distinguish him from his father, George Fort Milton Sr., who died in 1924 and preceded him as owner of the Chattanooga News of Chattanooga, Tennessee. At the time of his death he was remembered as a "liberal editor keenly interested in the development of the South."

== Biography ==
Milton attended prep school in Knoxville, Tennessee, where his father owned the Knoxville Sentinel, and graduated from the University of Virginia in 1916. After college he worked as a reporter for the Washington Times and the New-York Tribune before joining the U.S. Army for World War I as a lieutenant. He saw combat at "Chalons-Sur-Marne, Veale, Chateau-Thierry, St Mihiel, the Argonne, and Sedan with a headquarters company, and with the 149th Field Artillery."

Milton and his father before him were known as reformers who played important roles "in Chattanooga civic work and politics" and generally opposed the mayoralty of Ed Bass. During his newspaper career, he served as managing editor of the Chattanooga News from 1919 to 1924, and president and editor from 1924 to 1939. He also served as an editor of the Knoxville Sentinel, and wrote editorials for the St. Louis Post-Dispatch and the Buffalo Evening News in the 1940s. In 1950 he was appointed to be a writer for the Library of Congress.

Milton was a vociferous supporter of the New Deal generally, and a major advocate for the Tennessee Valley Authority infrastructure projects in particular. Between 1940 and 1944 he "served as consultant to the Bureau of the Budget" in Washington.

Milton signed the bond for John Thomas Scopes of Scopes Trial fame, was friends with William Jennings Bryan, and "established a news bureau in Dayton, Tennessee" to cover the trial.

His racial views were "surely more advanced than most of his fellow southerners," although a certain paternalism was evident in his writings. He was a member of the Commission on Interracial Progress, and chairman of the Southern Commission on the Study of Lynching from 1930 to 1934. W. E. B. DuBois wrote a letter praising his work on lynchings in the south in the 1930s (Milton had written the introduction to the commission's report). Milton opposed a federal anti-lynching law, instead advocating for drastic social and legal reforms by individual Southern states. Milton defended the Scottsboro boys in print, arguing early for their innocence. Conversely, he never opposed segregation in any meaningful way.

Milton died at St. Elizabeth's Hospital in Washington, D.C. after a long illness.

== Selected works ==
- The Age of Hate: Andrew Johnson and the Radicals (1931)
- The Eve of Conflict: Stephen Douglas & the Needless War (1934)
- Conflict: The American Civil War (1941)
- Abraham Lincoln and the Fifth Column (1942)
- The Use of Presidential Power, 1789–1943 (1944)

== See also ==
- Abby Crawford Milton – American suffragist and supercentenarian (1881–1991)
