= Fay W. Brabson =

U.S. Army officer and historian (1880–1970)

Fay Warrington Brabson
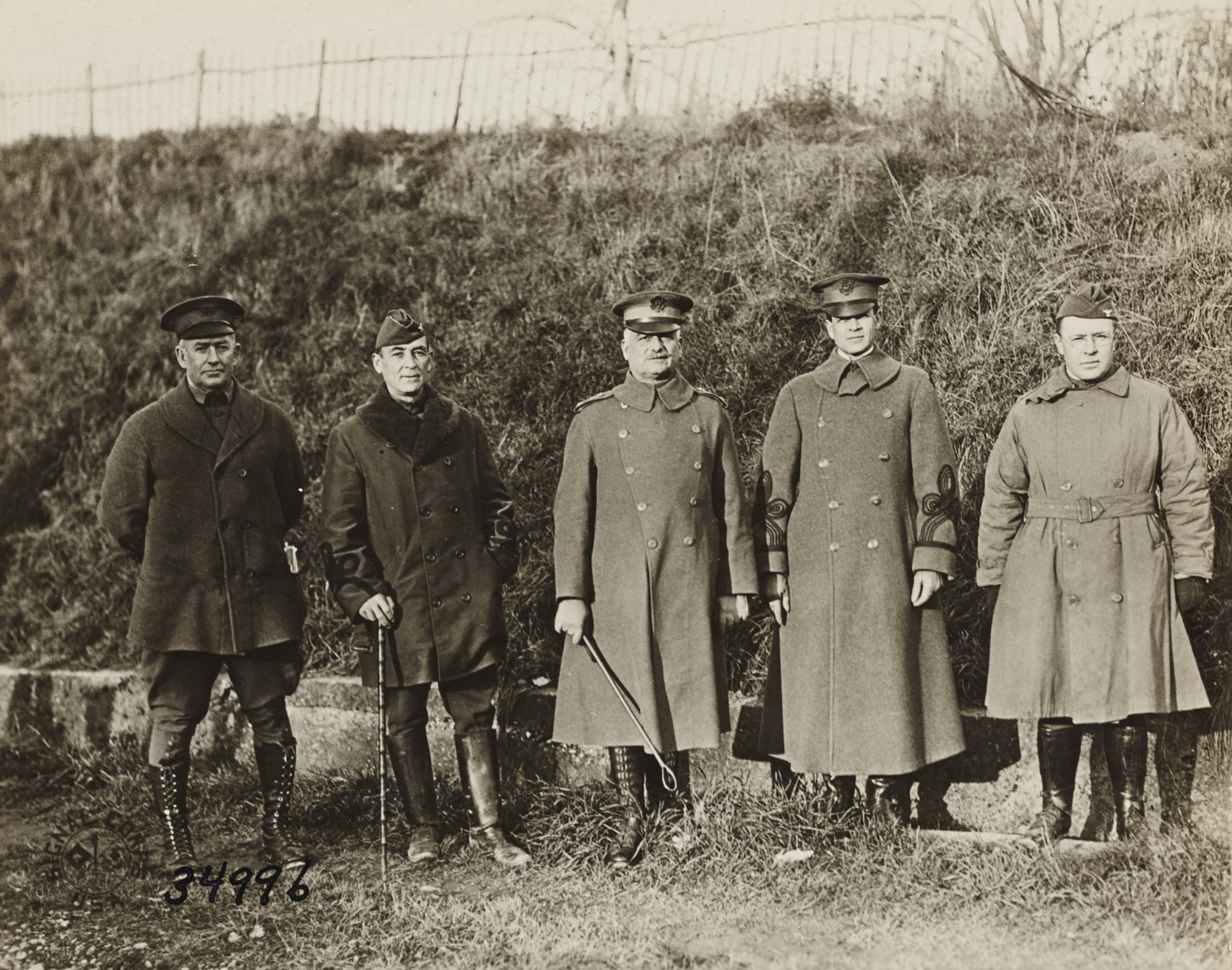
- Major General William Weigel, commanding the 88th Division, and members of his staff, pictured here at Lagney, Meurthe-et-Moselle, France, November 15, 1918. The 88th's chief of staff, Colonel Fay W. Brabson, is second from the left.
- Born: June 13, 1880; Greeneville, Tennessee, United States
- Died: June 14, 1970 (aged 90); Staunton, Virginia, United States
- Burial place: Arlington National Cemetery
- Spouse: Esther Parsons Brabson
- Military career
- Allegiance: United States
- Branch: United States Army
- Service years: 1902–1944
- Rank: Colonel
- Unit: 88th Division
- Conflicts: World War I World War II
- Awards: Army Distinguished Service Medal
- Other work: Professor, Staunton Military Academy

Fay Warrington Brabson (June 13, 1880 – June 14, 1970) was a U.S. Army officer, civil governor of a district of the Philippines during the American colonial period, history teacher, and biographer of U.S. president Andrew Johnson.

== Biography ==
Born in Andrew Johnson's hometown of Greeneville, Tennessee, Brabson was one of 11 children born to John M. Brabson, founder of the First National Bank of Greeneville, and his wife Maria Harmon. Brabson graduated from the University of Tennessee with a B.A. in 1901. He later earned a master's degree from Vanderbilt in 1913, with a thesis on the later political career of Andrew Johnson. His education also included courses at the U.S. Army War College, and Army Tank School.

He joined the U.S. Army in 1902 as an infantry officer. His first posting was at Fort Apache, where "he commanded one of the last troops of Apache Indian scouts, then part of the Army." In 1906 he was classmates with George C. Marshall at the Command and General Staff School at Fort Leavenworth. Brabson also served "two tours of duty in the Philippine Islands, sharing in the suppression of the insurrection in Samar and participating in campaigns against the Moros."

Brabson was civil governor of the Malabang district of Mindanao from 1909 to 1910. During the Mexican Border War he "captured a pack train of revolutionary forces" and "commanded the international bridge at El Paso during Madero and Villa's siege and the capture of Juarez, Mexico."

During World War I he served in France, initially as training officer of the 29th Division and later as chief of staff of the 88th Division. He was awarded the Army Distinguished Service Medal during World War I for his work at the general staff college in Langres, France in 1918. The citation for the medal reads:

The President of the United States of America, authorized by Act of Congress, July 9, 1918, takes pleasure in presenting the Army Distinguished Service Medal to Lieutenant Colonel (Infantry) Fay W. Brabson, United States Army, for exceptionally meritorious and distinguished services to the Government of the United States, in a duty of great responsibility during World War I. As an Instructor of the Army General Staff College, Langres, France, May to September 15, 1918, Lieutenant Colonel Brabson performed exceptionally meritorious services to the Government in instructing and preparing student officers to function in the important and responsible positions as General Staff officers with troops.

From 1921 to 1924 he was "Head of Tactical Section, Infantry School" at Fort Benning. Brabson was transferred to the General Staff in 1933. He was "chief of the intelligence staff of the War Department general staff" in Washington, D.C. for four years. He was hired to lead the military science department at Rutgers in 1939, and at Lehigh in 1942. He was heavily involved in training logistics during World War II. Assignments included building and commanding Camp Wolters in Texas, as well as training the 45th and 90th Divisions at Camp Barkley. He assisted in making the "progressive military map north of Manila which the American Army used in 1945 in recapturing that city."

Following his retirement from the army, he was a history teacher at Staunton Military Academy. It was during this period of his life that he wrote Andrew Johnson: a life in pursuit of the right course, 1808–1875, which was published posthumously, in 1972. During his army career he contributed to Tactical Principles and Decisions, General Staff Functioning of Large Units, Combat Orders, Musketry and Rifle Platoon Training, and Staff Officers' Note Book.

His wife, Esther Parsons Brabson, was a graduate of Wellesley and MIT. She was an editor of House Beautiful prior to her marriage, and in later life worked restoring Federalist residential architecture in the Shenandoah Valley and volunteered at the Smithsonian Institution. They had three children together.

In his spare time Fay Brabson collected first editions of the poetry of Edna St. Vincent Millay. Brabson died in Staunton, Virginia in 1970 at the age of 90.

== Brothers and nephews ==
Two of Fay W. Brabson's brothers were also U.S. Army officers. Col. Sam Brabson was a graduate of the Virginia Military Institute. He served in China, spoke Chinese, was acquainted with Chiang Kai-shek, and "heard the initial shot on the Marco Polo Bridge." In later life he was commandant of the Tennessee Military Institute.

Lt. Col. Joe R. Brabson was a field artillery officer. He was a graduate of the University of Tennessee, was awarded the Distinguished Service Medal for his contribution to the American army during World War I, and is buried at Arlington National Cemetery. Joe R. and Fay W. Brabson each became "chief" of one of the 29 combat divisions of the American Expeditionary Forces (AEF) in World War I.

Joe R. Brabson's son Lt. Col. Joe R. Brabson Jr., a West Point graduate and army pilot, was killed off the "Ceram Islands in the Pacific" on January 1, 1945. Joe R. Brabson's son Col. Kimberly Brabson was a graduate of VMI, was in the U.S. Army for 33 years, and was awarded a Silver Star in 1944.
