= Hans L. Trefousse =

- Born: December 19, 1921; Frankfurt, Germany
- Died: January 8, 2010 (aged 88); Staten Island, New York, U.S.
- Education: City College New York (B.A., 1942); Columbia University (M.A., 1947)(PhD. 1950)
- Occupations: Author, historian, professor
- Spouse: Rashelle Friedlander

Hans Louis Trefousse (December 18, 1921–January 8, 2010) was a German-American author and historian of the Reconstruction Era and World War II. He was a long-time professor (and professor emeritus) at Brooklyn College from 1950 to 1998. He also taught as a distinguished professor of history at Graduate Center of the City University of New York.

== Early and military life ==
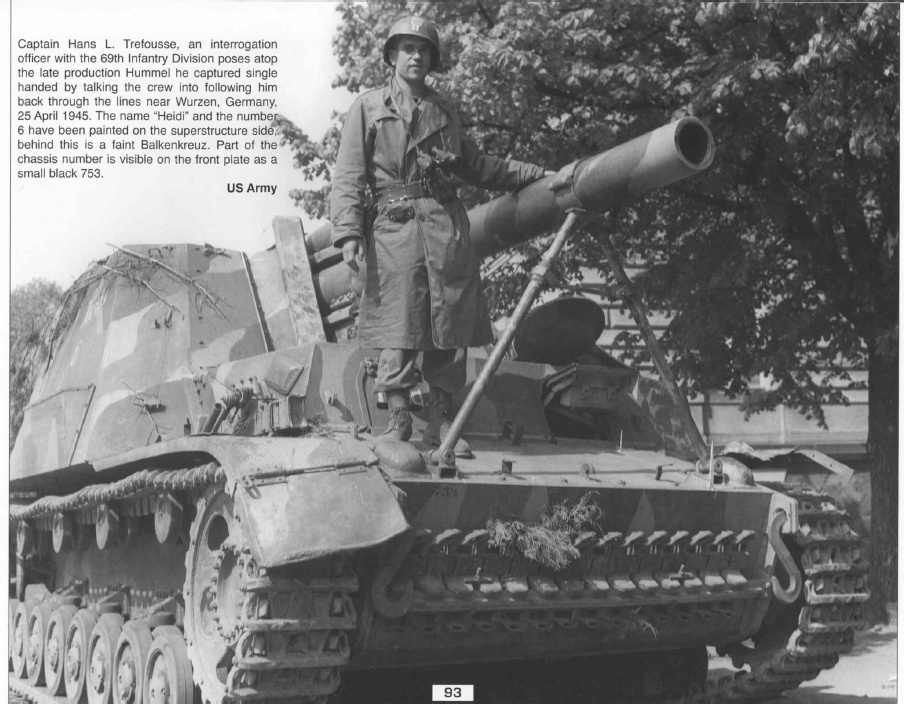
Intelligence officer and interrogator Hans L. Trefousse with the Nazi German Hummel self-propelled gun he convinced the crew of to surrender to the Allies. Near Wurzen, Germany.

Trefousse was born in Germany and emigrated to the United States in 1935 (at age 13) as his parents fled the increasingly totalitarian Nazi regime. He graduated Phi Beta Kappa from New York City College in 1942. He then enlisted in the U.S. Army, where he served as an intelligence officer in World War II, using his fluent German to interrogate German soldiers. He also participated in the Liberation of Paris, and in Leipzig saved hundreds of lives by arguing for 11 hours with a Nazi commander holed with many troops, convincing him to surrender to Allied forces.

Using his GI Bill benefits, Trefousse studied history at Columbia University, receiving his M.A. in 1947 and Ph.D. in 1950. He married Rachelle Friedlander two years later, and they had a son and daughter who survived them.

== Career ==
Trefousse initially was interested in diplomatic history, and his first book, based on his dissertation, was German and American Neutrality, 1939–1941. After encountering racist incidents in New York City, he switched focus, publishing a biography, Ben Butler: The South Called Him Beast! (1957), detailing the military governor's harsh but efficient administration of New Orleans, Louisiana, after its surrender to the U.S. Navy during the American Civil War. He continued to teach at Brooklyn College and published many books on the Reconstruction era, including biographies of previously maligned Radical Republicans Benjamin F. Wade and Thaddeus Stevens, as well as Presidents Andrew Johnson and Rutherford B. Hayes. Some historians consider his most influential book The Radical Republicans: Lincoln's Vanguard for Racial Justice (1969), which disagreed with the dominant historical narrative of the time regarding Reconstruction, arguing instead that Reconstruction was a failed attempt "to bring racial justice to the South." In total Trefousse authored over twenty books.

He gained media attention during Bill Clinton's impeachment for drawing comparisons to Johnson's impeachment.

=== Books ===
- German and American Neutrality, 1939–1941 (1951)
- Benjamin Franklin Wade: Radical Republican from Ohio (1953)
- Ben Butler: The South Called Him Beast! (1957)
- The Cold War (1965)
- The Radical Republicans: Lincoln's Vanguard for Racial Justice (1969)
- Reconstruction: America's First Effort at Racial Democracy (1971)
- Impeachment of a President: Andrew Johnson, the Blacks, and Reconstruction (1975)
- Lincoln's Decision for Emancipation (1975)
- Carl Schurz: A Biography (1982)
- Pearl Harbor: The Continuing Controversy (1982)
- Andrew Johnson (1989). W. W. Norton & Company.
- Historical Dictionary of Reconstruction (1991)
- Thaddeus Stevens: Nineteenth-Century Egalitarian (1997)
- Rutherford B. Hayes (2002)
- "First Among Equals": Abraham Lincoln's Reputation During His Administration (2005)
