= Charles Johnson (Tennessee) =

Son of 17th U.S. President Andrew Johnson

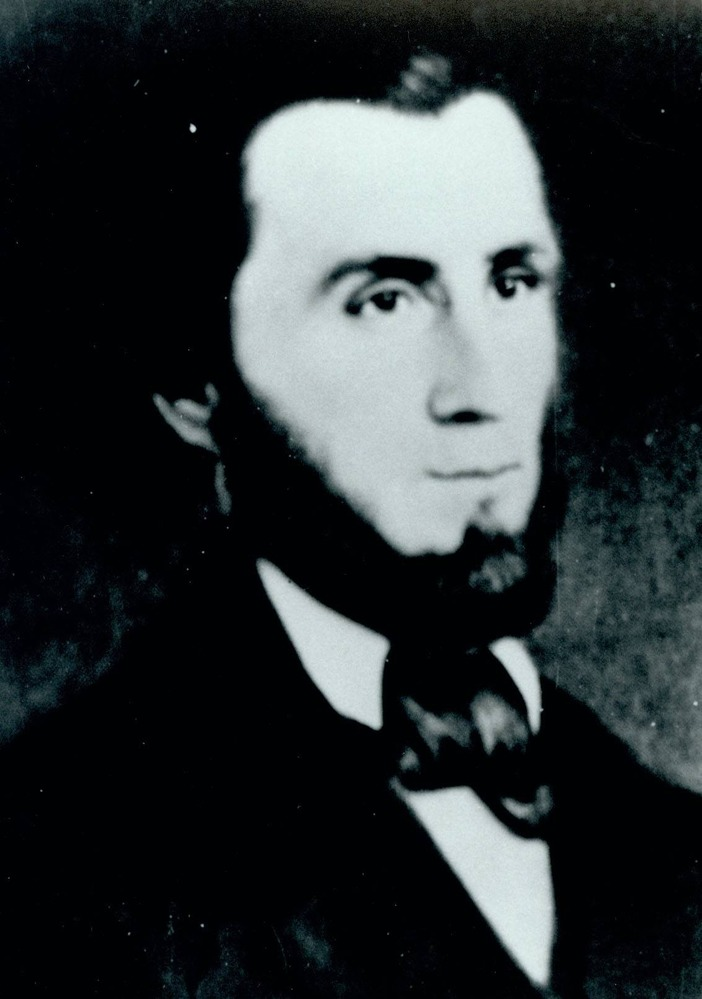
- Undated portrait (U.S. National Park Service)
- Born: February 19, 1830; Greeneville, Tennessee, U.S.
- Died: April 4, 1863 (aged 33); Nashville, Tennessee, C.S. (Note: Tennessee seceded to the Confederate States in 1861, Andrew Johnson governed in Nashville as military governor from 1862, Tennessee returned to the Union under U.S. law in 1866.)

Charles Johnson (February 19, 1830 – April 4, 1863) was the first-born son of 17th U.S. President Andrew Johnson and his wife Eliza McCardle Johnson. He died at age 33 near Nashville, during the American Civil War, while his father was serving as military governor of Tennessee.

Charles Johnson was remembered as his mother's favorite. She was said to have "never quite recovered" from her grief at his early death. Charles Johnson's death is sometimes mentioned as one of the causes for Eliza Johnson's self-isolation during the family's White House years. He was noted for both his conviviality but also his "dissipation," and he is believed to have suffered from the same alcoholism that contributed to his brother Robert Johnson's death in 1869.

== Biography ==
Born 1830 in the family's Main Street house in Greeneville, Tennessee, Charles Johnson was the second-born of Andrew Johnson's five children with Eliza McCardle. Charles Johnson was working in Greeneville at age 20 as a printer at the time of the 1850 census. For about a year he was a partner in a newspaper called the Greeneville Spy, and circa 1857 he co-owned a drugstore and worked as a druggist. Charles and his brother Robert also managed their father's business affairs and real estate when Andrew Johnson was away from Tennessee.

At the time of the 1860 census, when he was 30, he was living in the family home, but his occupation was now listed as physician. But that same year, he also visited Charleston, South Carolina, for the 1860 Democratic National Convention and had "gotten on a spree" that had troubled the family, meaning that he had been drunk for the duration to the point that his brother had a hard time even getting him out of the city. In January 1861, as the nation was collapsing into civil war, Andrew Johnson's son Robert reported that Charles had gone on another "spree." Both Johnson brothers were delegates from Greene County at the May–June 1861 pro-Union East Tennessee Convention. When Tennessee went for the Confederacy, both Southern Unionist Johnson sons were wanted men, their brother-in-law David T. Patterson was imprisoned, and their brother-in-law Daniel Stover, a leader of the East Tennessee bridge burners, would have been summarily executed by CSA troops had he been captured. According to the National Park Service, at some point early in the war Charles Johnson took the Confederate oath of allegiance, "apparently in an unsuccessful attempt to preserve family property."

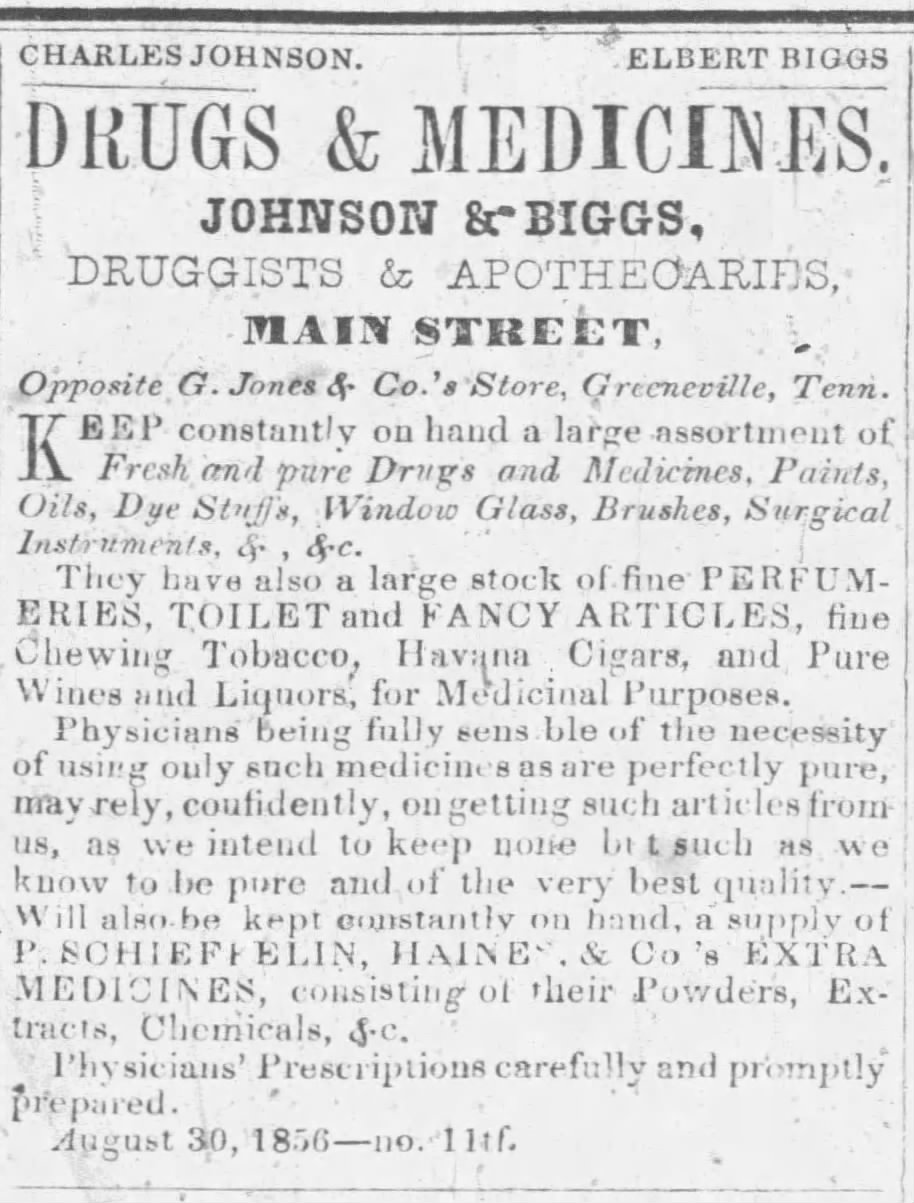
Charles Johnson & Elbert Biggs, Drugs & Medicines, Main Street, Greeneville, Tennessee (American Presbyterian, May 13, 1857)

Andrew Johnson was made military governor of Tennessee by President Lincoln and the U.S. Senate on March 5, 1862. Charles apparently traveled with him to the capital in the fall of 1862, where he enlisted in the federal army. He served as an assistant surgeon under Rudolph Knaffl in the 10th Tennessee Infantry Regiment of the U.S. Army, which was also known as the Middle Tennessee Infantry.

== Death ==
Charles Johnson died at Nashville during the American Civil War after being thrown from a horse. As one bio put it, his death was "under circumstances that were never quite clear." Two news accounts stated that he was killed almost instantly due to a traumatic head injury. Another account said he was on duty at camp in the suburbs of Nashville when the horse he was riding "became restive" and then reared and fell on top of him, which caused the fatal injuries, and that he lingered for a "few hours."

According to a telling in 1869:

One bright spring morning he started on the rounds of his professional duty. In the exuberance of health, youth, and spirits, he sprang upon the horse of a brother officer. He had gone but a short distance when the high-mettled creature reared upon his hind feet suddenly; the young man was thrown backward, and falling upon the frozen earth was instantly killed."

An account published in 1891 stated, "Of the three bright, promising sons born to [Andrew Johnson] all died victims of the same enemy that carried the illustrious father away—the bottle. One of the young men was a dear fellow who I knew and loved well. One day during the war he was toppled from his horse on the streets of Nashville, Tenn. He was picked up with a broken skull."

According to Paul Bergeron, a University of Tennessee historian and the last of three major editors of The Papers of Andrew Johnson, "Charles...had been cursed for many years with a serious drinking problem. Many believed he was drunk on the day of his fatal accident." The family was notified by telegram from Tennessee Secretary of State Edward H. East. The only family member able to attend the April 7, 1863, funeral was Robert Johnson, and the funeral procession included part of his regiment, the 1st Tennessee Cavalry.

According to the U.S. National Park Service, which operates the Andrew Johnson National Historic Site, Charles Johnson was originally buried at Mount Olivet in the Tennessee state capital. Charles Johnson does not appear by name in the Mount Olivet burial record for April 1863, but there is a "Mrs. Patterson" entry for Lot I on April 29, 1863, with no cause of death or age listed; this may be Charles Johnson's burial recorded under the name of older sister Martha Johnson Patterson, although she was said to be "across enemy lines in Greeneville." Charles Johnson was eventually reinterred in the family burial plot at Andrew Johnson National Cemetery, where he shares a grave marker with Robert Johnson.

== See also ==
- List of children of presidents of the United States
- Andrew Johnson alcoholism debate
