= William A. Browning =

American political staffer (1835–1866)

- Born: May 2, 1835; Washington, D.C., U.S.
- Died: March 2, 1866 (aged 30); Washington, D.C., U.S.

William A. Browning, also known as Colonel Browning (May 2, 1835 – March 2, 1866), was a 19th-century American political staffer. He served as a private secretary to U.S. Senator, then military governor of Tennessee, then Vice President and U.S. president, Andrew Johnson. Browning is mostly remembered today for being the recipient of a note from Abraham Lincoln's assassin John Wilkes Booth.

== Biography ==
Browning, born May 2, 1835 to a tailor named Peregrine Browning and his wife Margaret A. (Wood) Browning, was a native of the District of Columbia. William A. Browning was one of 12 children born to the couple, and the eldest son. Browning was said to be a graduate of Yale College. He may have married Gertrude Allis (1835 – March 1, 1858), the daughter of Emily Stockbridge and Salmon White Allis, who kept the Tontine Hotel in New Haven, Connecticut.

He had been admitted to the bar of the Supreme Court of the United States. Andrew Johnson had apparently known him "since his boyhood, and obtained for him an appointment to a government job." Browning eventually left his position "at one of the Departments" to go work for Johnson. He began working as Johnson's secretary when Johnson was a U.S. Senator from Tennessee and stayed with him until his first year in the White House. In 1863, while Johnson was military governor of Tennessee, Browning was appointed adjutant general of Tennessee, succeeding Alvan C. Gillem. A Memphis newspaper wrote at the time, "The appointment of Col. Browning to so important an office is a most proper acknowledgment of his eminent worth and executive ability." On the Fourth of July 1864, Browning read the Declaration of Independence as part of a Union celebration at Nashville, following a parade that included "a procession over a mile long, consisting of the 31st Wisconsin, 13th regulars, 10th Tennessee, 5th Iowa cavalry, several batteries of artillery, the Fire Department, [and] citizens on foot and on horseback."

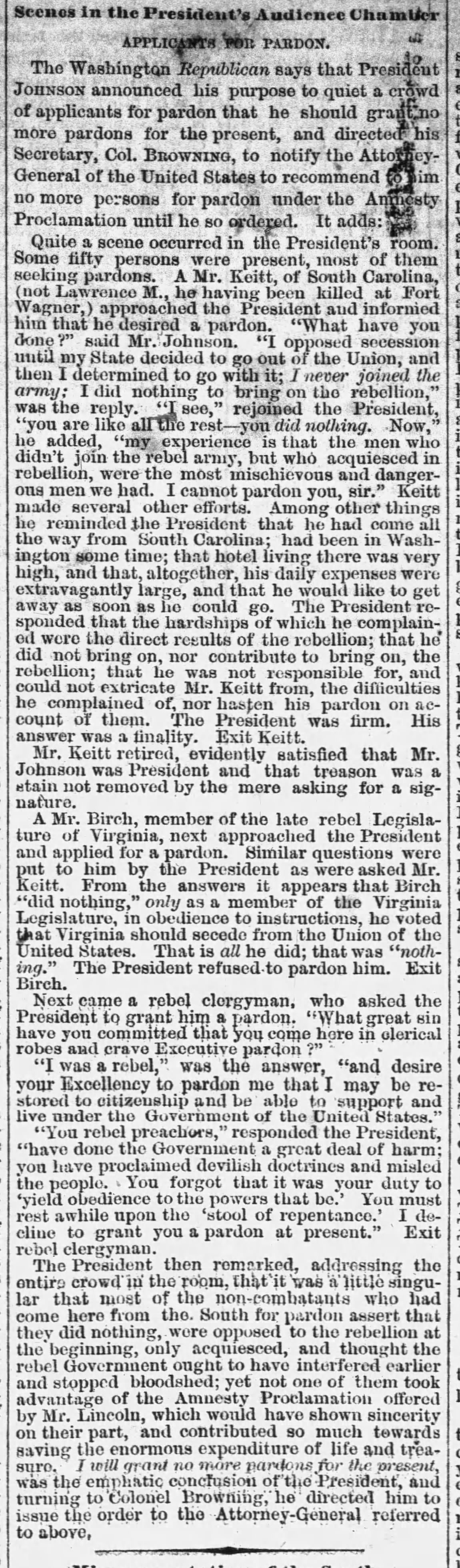
President Johnson and Col. Browning met with defeated Confederates, after which Johnson told Browning to inform the Attorney General he will be granting no further pardons for the time being; "Mr Keitt retired evidently satisfied that Mr Johnson was President and 'that treason was a stain not removed by the mere asking for a signature' " (Charleston Daily Courier, September 2, 1865)

During the fall 1864, he was apparently working for Johnson but was unable to do much work writing letters and private dispatches "due to illness." Browning was commissioned November 14, 1865 and/or nominated December 9, 1865 to be secretary of legation to Mexico under Gen. John A. Logan of Illinois as Minister to Mexico. However, Browning died in Washington, D.C., in March 1866 "after several weeks' sickness." He never left the United States or took up the position. The cause of death was said to be, variously, an "inflammation of the bowels" or "a severe attack of inflammatory rheumatism, which resulted in paralysis." His health had declined over a period of two months and then taken a turn for the worse when he was in New York. He apparently died at his parents' home on Missouri Avenue. Upon hearing the news of his death, Andrew Johnson's daughters Martha Patterson and Mary Stover, who served as his political hostesses, canceled the White House public receptions planned for the week and were said to have been "at the residence of Col. Browning most of the day." President Johnson, Martha Patterson, David T. Patterson, Mary Stover, and several members of Congress all attended the funeral. Browning was buried at the Congressional Cemetery, in Washington, D.C.

Shortly after his funeral, a North Carolina newspaper opined, "The death of Col. Browning, formerly private secretary to the president, was hastened by his own acts. He could not resist the seductive bowl and fell a victim to its temptations. The deceased was possessed of excellent talents and was capable of filing the most responsible positions with honor. Let others take warning from his fate." After Andrew Johnson's son Robert Johnson died of an overdose in 1869, an anonymous columnist wrote a widely reprinted recollection of some of the figures of the Johnson era, including Browning:

Browning was one of the handsomest men in the world, tall, muscular, finely formed with an open pleasing countenance and a complexion as clear and a skin as fine as Ireland or Nantucket gives to the fairest of women. He had graduated at Yale College and was a fine belles lettres scholar and a man of many accomplishments. He had been with Mr. Johnson in Tennessee for several years and went with him to the White House. But his stay was of short duration. He received the appointment of Secretary of Legation to Mexico. He never left the country however. The same habit [alcohol abuse] which has now carried off young Johnson did its fatal work with him more speedily...Mr. Browning was married when quite young to a beautiful girl who lived but a short time after her marriage. He never seemed to recover in any degree from the shock of her death. On the contrary the pain of the separation seemed constantly to deepen and grow more poignant in his heart. The last time we met him was in Washington only a short time before his death. In the course of a brief conversation he said...'my heart is buried in my wife's grave and I want to die.' Soon afterwards he shut himself up in a room and deliberately drank whisky until it killed him.

— Unknown, "White House Reminiscences: Victims of Intemperance and Insanity" (1869)

== April 1865 ==
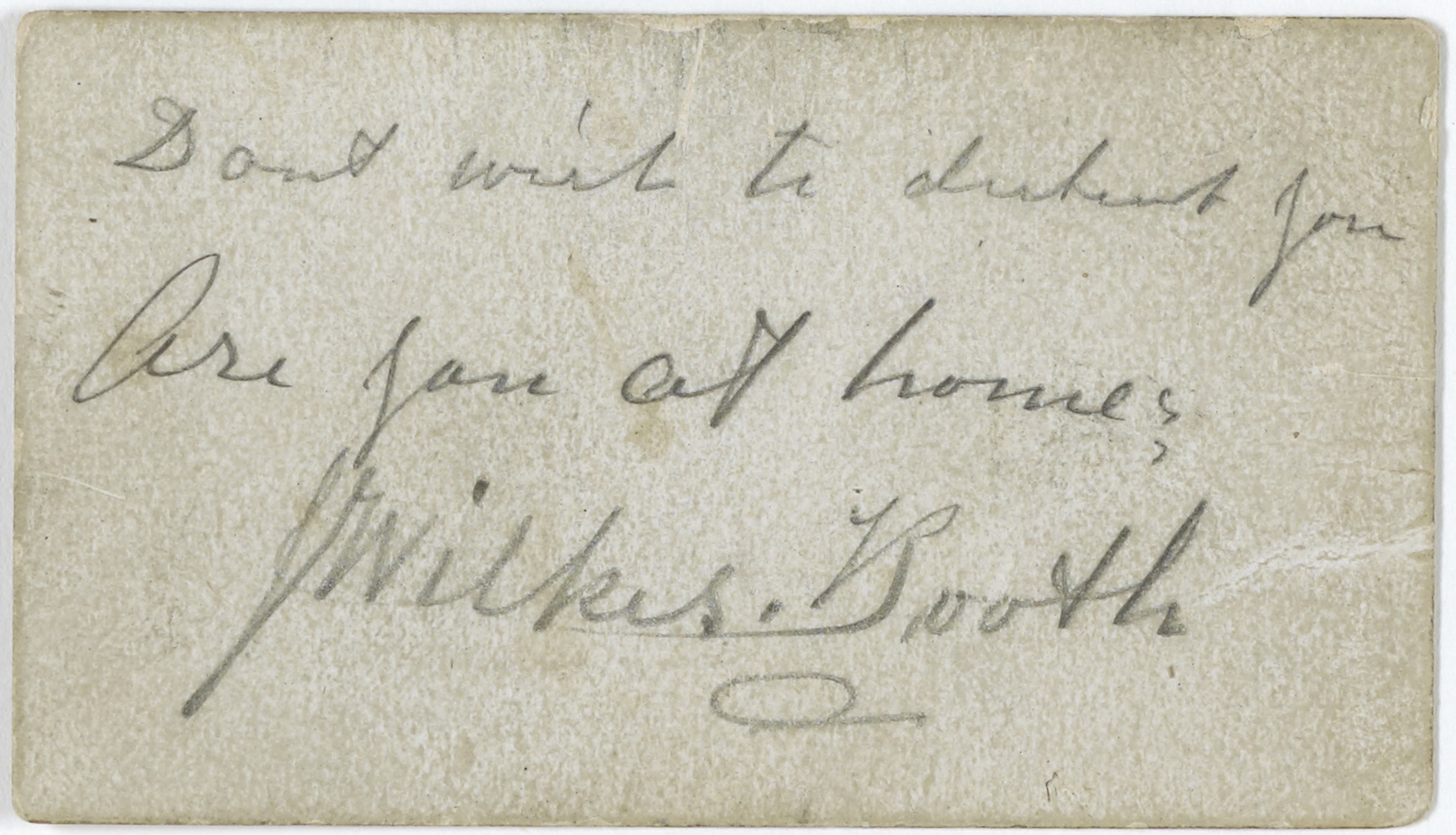
John Wilkes Booth's Calling Card, 04/14/1865. (National Archives Identifier 7873510)

On April 14, 1865, John Wilkes Booth left a note at Kirkwood House (where Andrew Johnson and William A. Browning had rooms) that read, "Don't wish to disturb you Are you at home? J. Wilkes Booth" Browning later testified about finding the note and that Vice President Johnson was home that day at 5 p.m. and stayed in the rest of the evening. The note has fueled decades of debate as to whether Booth meant to slay Johnson himself, whether Booth and Johnson were co-conspirators, or if the note was actually meant for Browning "since one of Browning's brothers was said to be seen drinking with Booth the day of the assassination."

== See also ==
- Presidency of Andrew Johnson
- Andrew Johnson alcoholism debate
