= Henry Brown (steward) =

White House servant (?–1866)

Henry Brown (fl. 1863 – died October 25, 1866) was an American servant who worked in the U.S. executive mansion, the White House, as an assistant steward. He had worked for Andrew Johnson "for many years past," and was likely enslaved by him, and had continued with him as a paid servant after emancipation. Andrew Johnson is believed to have freed all of his personal slaves on August 8, 1863; consequently, August 8 has traditionally been celebrated as Emancipation Day in eastern Tennessee and parts of Kentucky.

Brown was described as an "intelligent and valued colored man who lived in the President's family in Tennessee, served in the First Tennessee Union Cavalry commanded by Col. Robert Johnson, and came with the President's family to Washington where he has lived ever since."

Brown died in Washington, D.C., of cholera "after a very brief illness." Johnson's daughter Mary Stover and Col. Johnson accompanied Brown's widow in the President's private carriage to the funeral. The funeral procession was otherwise composed of a large number of carriages occupied by people of color. Brown was buried at Harmony Cemetery.

Henry Brown may be conflated in some histories and biographies of Andrew Johnson with Henry Johnson, who was likely a younger man and died in 1890.

== See also ==
- Andrew Johnson and slavery
- African Americans in Tennessee

== See also ==
- 1863–1875 cholera pandemic
