= Robert Johnson (Tennessee) =

Son of Andrew Johnson (1834–1869)

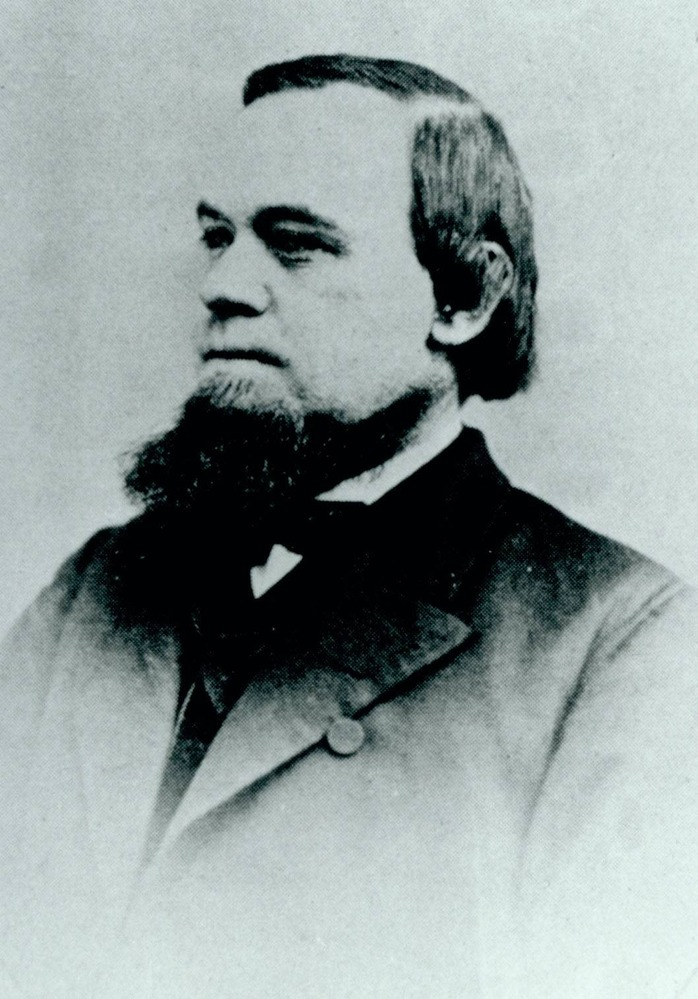
- Undated photo (U.S. National Park Service)

Private Secretary to the President
- In office November 14, 1865 – September 19, 1868
- President: Andrew Johnson
- Preceded by: William A. Browning
- Succeeded by: Edmund Cooper

Member of the Tennessee House of Representatives
- In office 1859–1861

Personal details
- Born: February 22, 1834 Greeneville, Tennessee, U.S.
- Died: April 22, 1869 (aged 35) Greeneville, Tennessee, U.S.
- Occupation: Lawyer; military officer; political staffer

Robert Johnson (February 22, 1834 – April 22, 1869) was the fourth-born child of Andrew Johnson and Eliza McCardle, a lawyer by profession, one-term Tennessee state legislator, Union Army cavalry officer during the American Civil War, and Secretary to the President of the United States. Johnson suffered from severe and chronic alcohol dependence. Despite having played little to no role in commanding his company during the war, Johnson was breveted brigadier general by his father. He died by overdose of alcohol and laudanum in the family home in Greeneville, Tennessee, six weeks after the end of President Johnson's term in office.

== Early life ==
Robert Johnson, called Bob, was born in the family's Water Street house in Greeneville, the county seat of Greene County, Tennessee. He is said to have briefly studied at Franklin College during the winter of 1850–51, but within short order returned home "for unknown reasons." During this time period he also apparently experienced some hemorrhaging of the lungs, possibly consequent to a tuberculosis infection. Johnson was a lawyer by profession, first licensed in 1856, having studied under an attorney named Robert McFarland. However, according to one contemporary newspaper account of his life, he was "never distinguished by his father's strong characteristics" in this profession. Robert and his brother Charles Johnson also managed their father's business affairs and real estate when Andrew Johnson was away from Tennessee. Early in his life, Robert Johnson had "seemed to be a responsible young adult, one upon whom his father depended for a variety of things." He attended the 1856 Democratic National Convention.

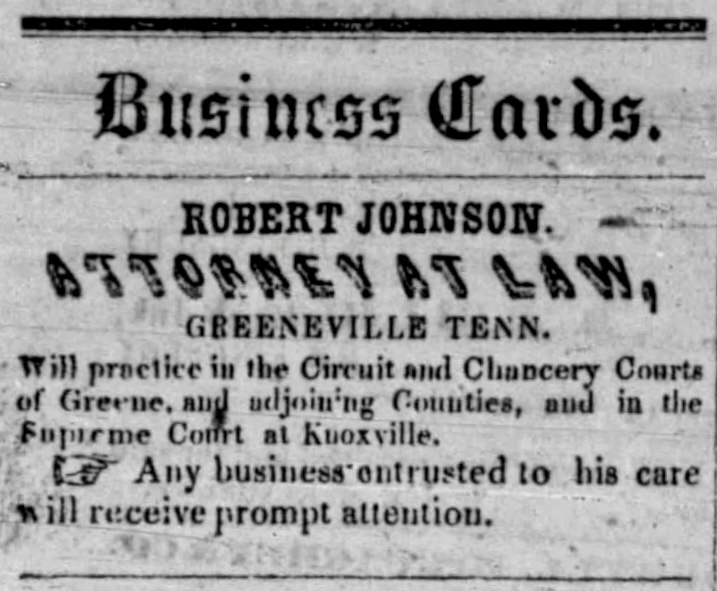
"Robert Johnson, attorney at law," Greeneville Democrat, May 4, 1859

Johnson served in the 33rd General Assembly of the Tennessee state legislature, for the term of 1859–1861, representing the "floating district" of Greene, Hancock, Hawkins, and Jefferson counties. According to the newspaper of dedicated Andy Johnson hater Parson Brownlow, "It is said that a principal object in trying to get Bob Johnson into the Legislature is to nominate, through that body, his daddy for the Presidency." Robert Johnson attended the 1860 Democratic National Convention in Charleston, South Carolina. Andrew Johnson was the only member of the U.S. Senate from a secessionist state who stayed loyal to the federal government; like his father, Robert Johnson was a "consistent, fearless and uncompromising Southern Unionist," and he made a notable speech at a courthouse in Nashville in defense of "Union, the Constitution and the Laws" just before the Tennessee ordinance of secession. In June 1861, he was a delegate from Greene County to the pro-Union East Tennessee Convention. As a vocal Southern Unionist, Johnson (along with his brothers, and his brothers-in-law David T. Patterson and Dan Stover) was in genuine danger in Tennessee in 1861—correspondents informed Andrew Johnson, safe in Washington, that Robert Johnson was under threat of arrest and even hanging. During the early months of the American Civil War, Johnson was hidden from Confederates by a Greeneville farmer named Robert Carter, (Note: Sam Johnson, who had been enslaved by Andrew Johnson for almost 20 years, worked for Robert C. Carter during early years of the American Civil War, likely in an attempt to avoid being "confiscated" by Confederates.) and may have also sheltered with one or more of the Union-aligned guerrilla bands working in the mountains. Bob Johnson later told a group of fellow Union-aligned East Tennesseans of having "scouted for months in the mountains of his native country, hunted from place to place, like a felon." On February 27, 1862, it was reported that he had arrived at a Union camp at Camp Garber on Flat Lick, Kentucky, after a two-week-long journey through parts of Tennessee still controlled by Confederates.

== Union Army ==
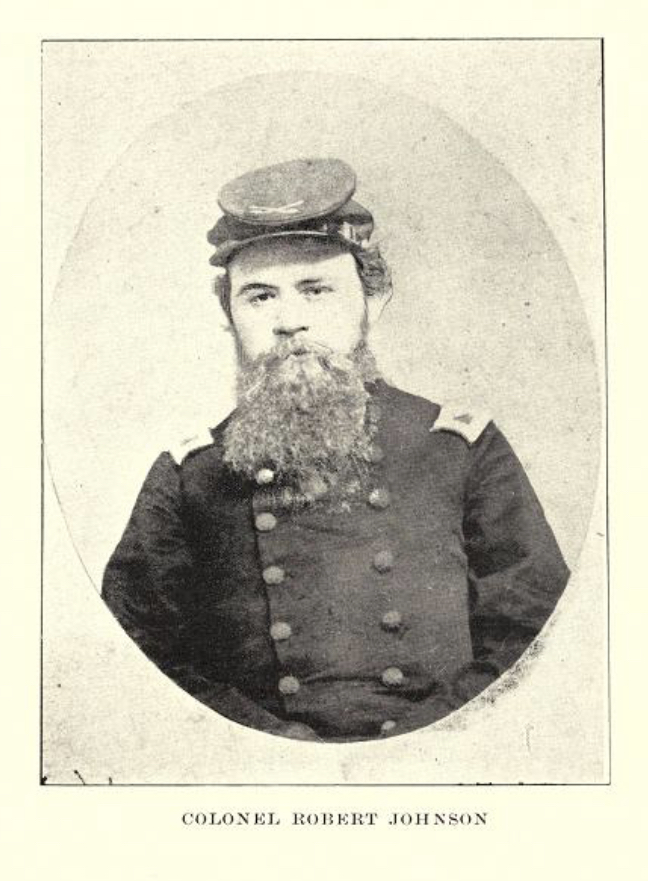
Colonel Robert Johnson during the American Civil War, from the regimental history published 1902

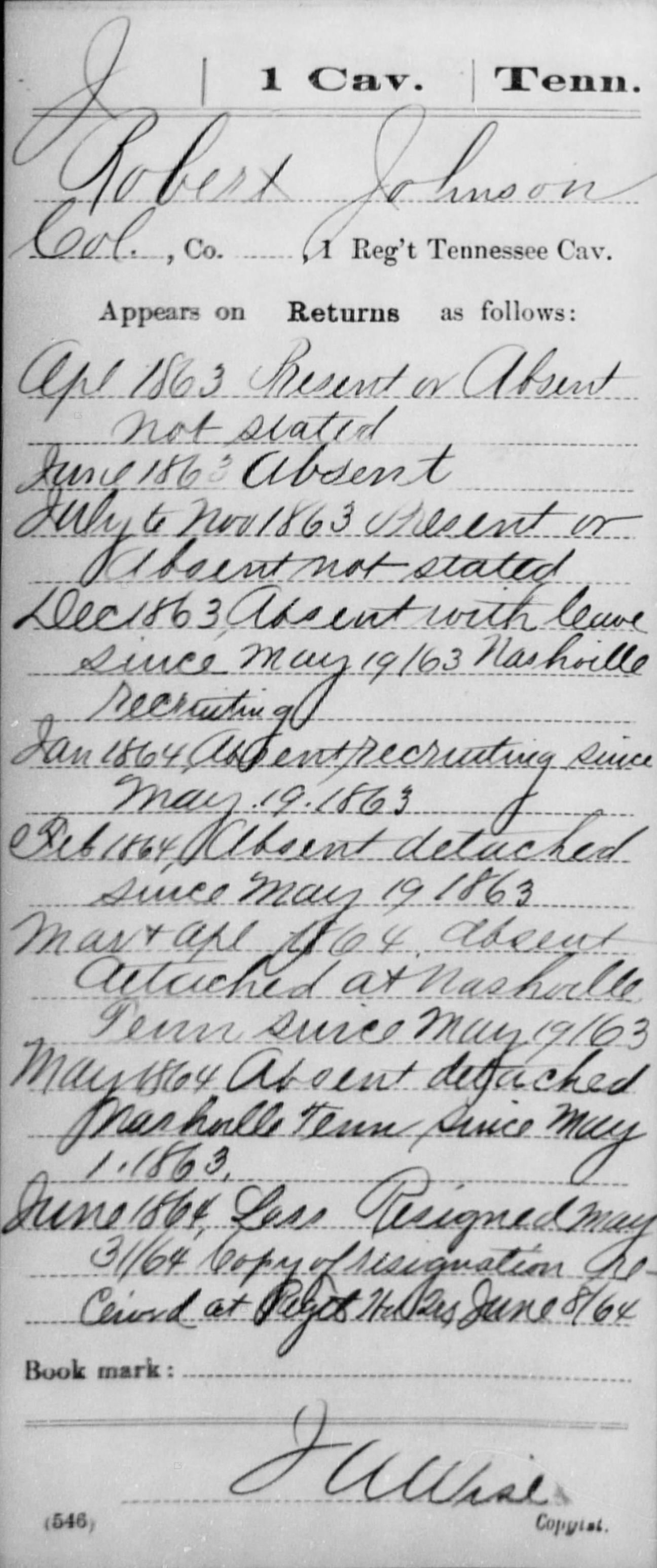
Johnson's muster-roll summary

Robert Johnson joined the Union Army at Camp Dennison (near Cincinnati, Ohio), in February 1862 for three years' service, being commissioned Colonel of the 4th Tennessee Volunteer Regiment, which he organized. He nominally commanded said unit, which was eventually mounted and redesignated 1st Tennessee Cavalry Regiment, in the Western theater of the American Civil War.

In March 1862 he left from Washington for Nashville, with his father, newly named as military governor of Tennessee, Johnson's secretary William A. Browning, and two Tennessee Congressmen, Horace Maynard, and Emerson Etheridge. In summer 1862, "Andrew Johnson exchanged communications with General George W. Morgan, begging him to watch over Robert and to encourage him to do his duty. The general responded with positive news." Years later, an Ohio newspaper writer wrote that circa October 1862, as the outnumbered federal army abandoned the Cumberland Gap and retreated to safer ground in Ohio, "between Portland and Gallipolis, the military authorities forbade every doggery keeper on the road letting [Robert Johnson] have any liquor, on account of his violent character when drunk."

On November 14, 1862, he was at the Union barracks in Cincinnati, Ohio, with his unit, where he made a speech to a couple of hundred East Tennessee refugees, and had dinner at the Burnet House hotel with politicians and military officers, including Horace Maynard; his son Lt. Col. Edward Maynard, 6th Tennessee; Col. Joseph Cooper, 6th Tennessee; and the redoubtable Parson Brownlow. Johnson, who was 5 ft 6 in (1.68 m), was said to be known as the "little big man" and during his speech was wearing the "blue jeans" common to the soldiery, but with the yellow stripe on the leg denoting cavalry. On December 6, 1862, the occasion of the organization of the 1st Tennessee as cavalry (rather than infantry), Johnson presented the regiment with a "splendid flag" inscribed with the words For Chattanooga, Knoxville and Greeneville, "indicating the determination of the regiment to assist in driving the rebels out of Tennessee, and redeeming the State." The 34-star American flag, also inscribed Johnson's 1st Tennessee Cavalry and "bound round the edge with yellow silk fringe," was produced by Hamlin of Cincinnati, "the prince of military furnishers in the West."

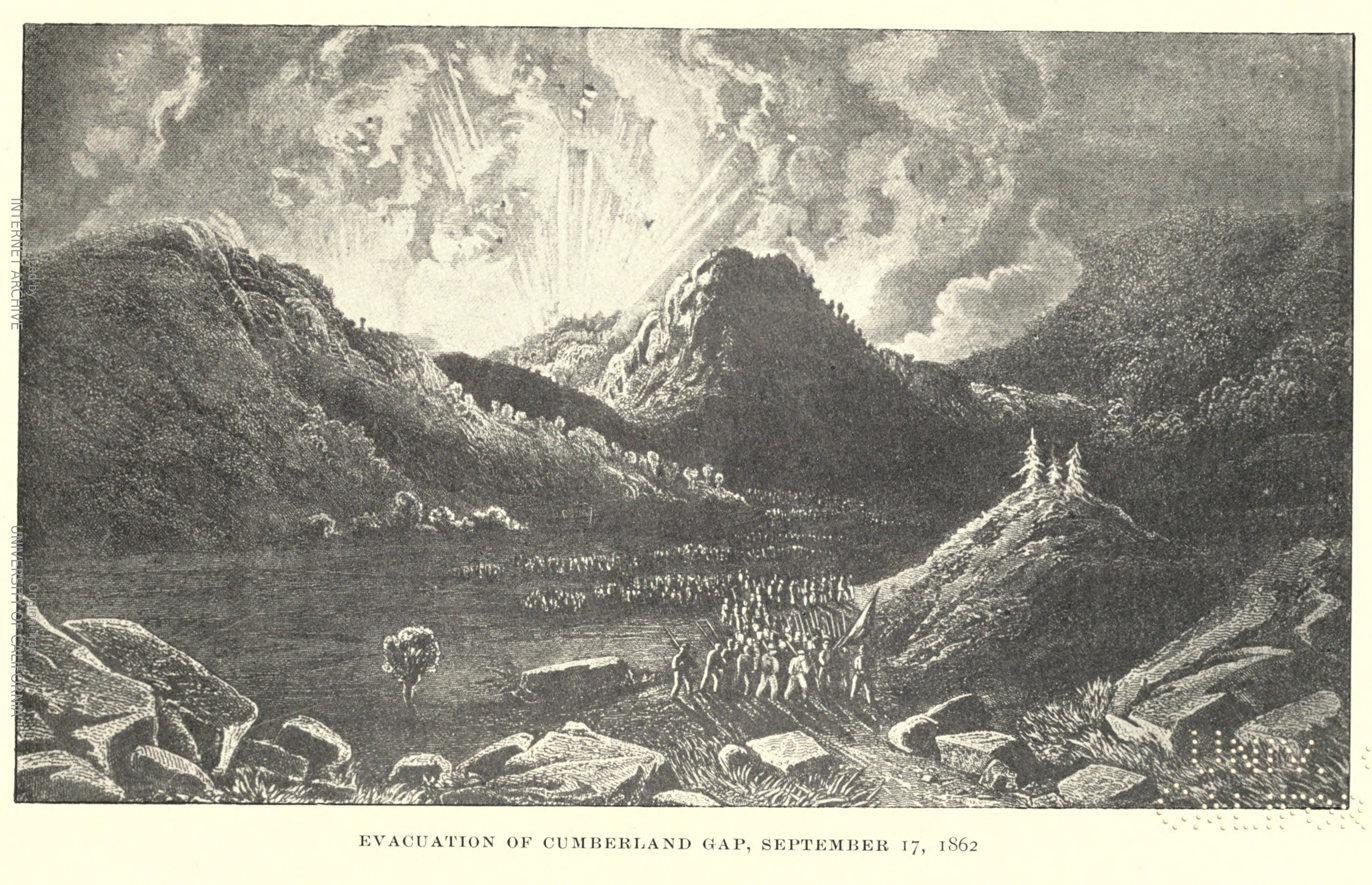
Evacuation of the Cumberland Gap, September 17, 1862 (American Publishing Company, Connecticut, 1865)

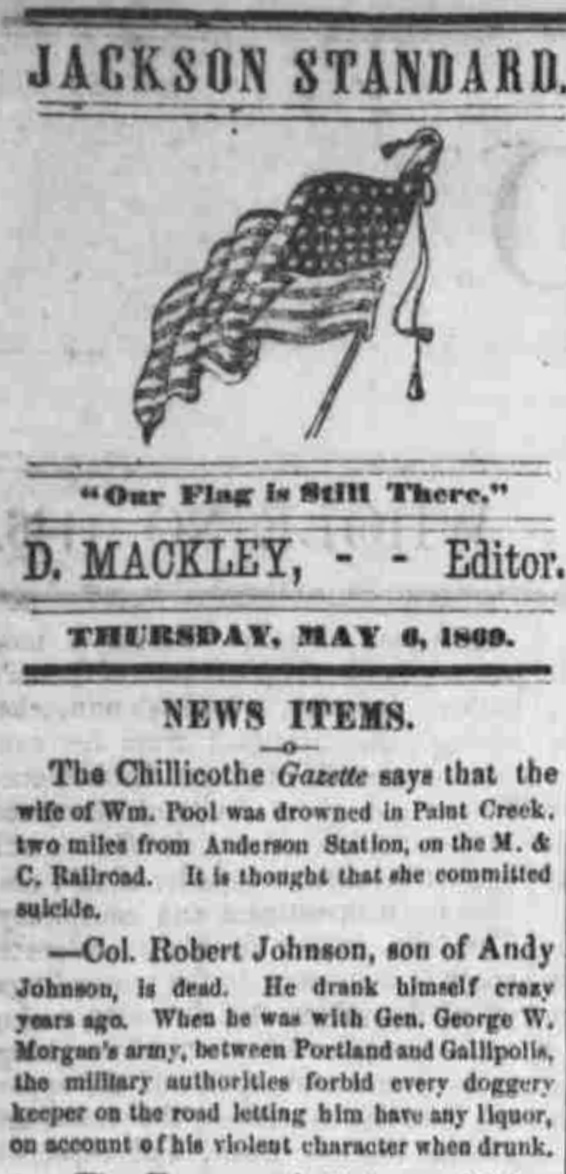
"Col. Robert Johnson, son of Andy Johnson, is dead. He drank himself crazy years ago. When he was with Gen. George W. Morgan's army, between Portland and Gallipolis, the military authorities forbade every doggery keeper on the road letting him have any liquor, on account of his violent character when drunk." (Jackson Standard, Jackson, Ohio, May 5, 1869)

On April 4, 1863, Robert Johnson's older brother Charles Johnson, an assistant surgeon with the 10th Tennessee Infantry, died at Nashville after being thrown from a horse. Robert Johnson was probably the only family member to attend the funeral in Middle Tennessee; part of his regiment participated in the funeral procession. On April 18, 1863, a New York newspaper published a small blurb stating, "The story about the capture by the rebels of Col. Robert Johnson, son of Gov. Andrew Johnson, of Tennessee, was fabricated. He is in Nashville, attending to his duties." Five days later, a Chicago paper reported that Johnson "reported captured by the rebels, is safe in Nashville." (Note: That newspapers in distant New York and Chicago had heard that Johnson was captured suggests he may have deserted or otherwise been absent without leave.) Following Charles Johnson's death, Robert Johnson's drinking became problematic that enough that Brigadier General William S. Rosecrans wrote Andrew Johnson, who had been appointed military governor of Tennessee by Abraham Lincoln, that "Robert has been drinking so as to become a subject of remark everywhere." Rosecrans also personally beseeched Robert Johnson to "cease the habit." The regimental history puts the date of Johnson's resignation "for ill health" on May 31, 1863, and includes the remark, "He was a kind officer and good to the men." James Patton Brownlow, the 20-year-old son of Andrew Johnson's longtime nemesis, William Gannaway Brownlow, replaced Robert Johnson as colonel. Brownlow had joined the regiment as a private, subsequently promoted to captain of a company, and then was made a lieutenant colonel; according to the 1902 regimental history, which does not otherwise record Johnson's troubles. Upon Johnson's resignation Brownlow was promoted immediately, "a promotion he well-deserved, since he was the real commander." The history associates Johnson's name primarily with general troop movements and regimental administration, while Brownlow's name generally appears in tales of sabre charges and daring raids.

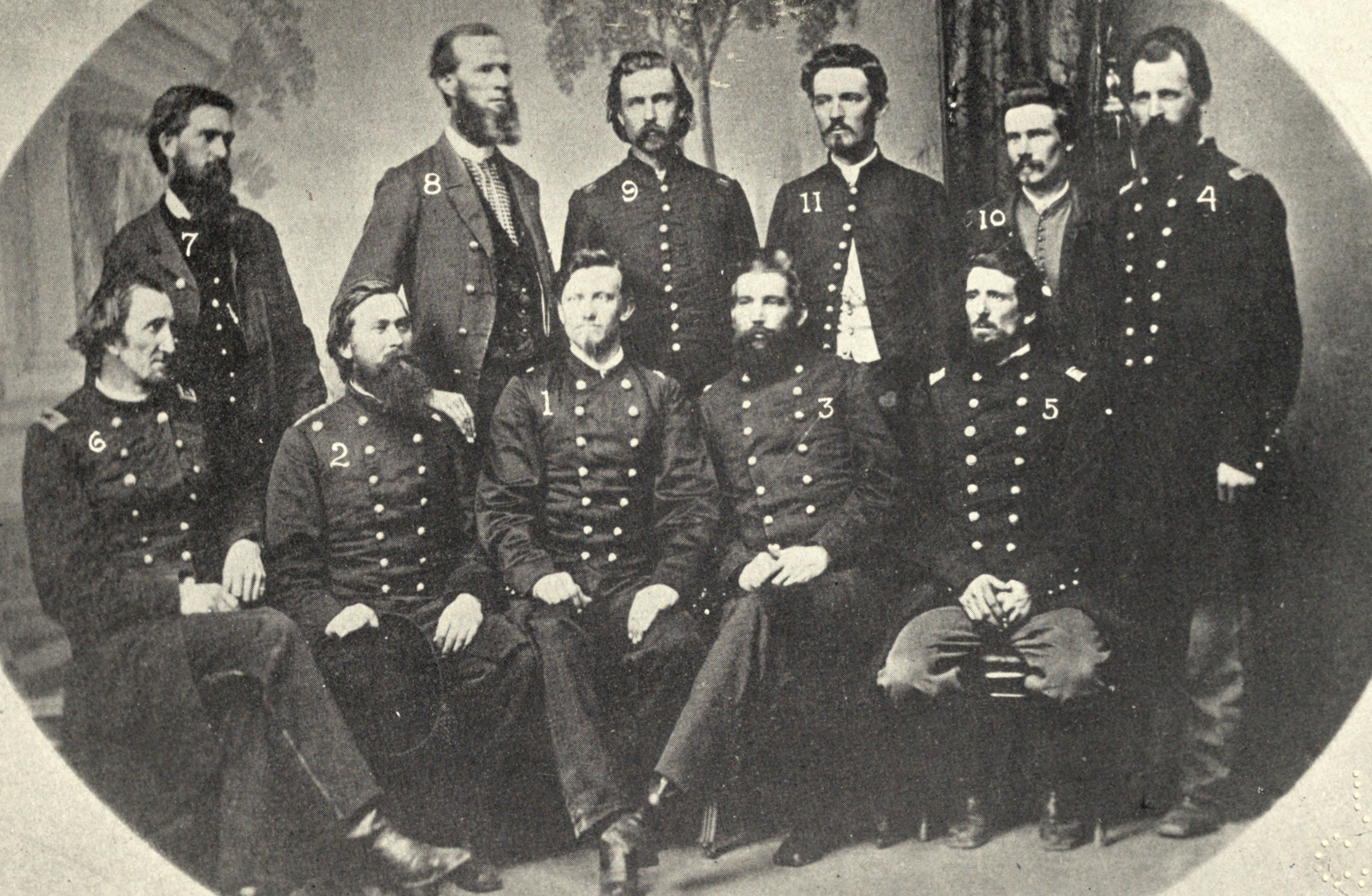
"Robert Johnson's regiment: Field and staff of the 1st Tennessee Cavalry Regiment (Union), photographed late August 1864; Col. Jim Brownlow, seated front and center, was in 70 battles and skirmishes and had four horses killed under him; Calvin Dyer, back row far left, took over after Brownlow was wounded in action

Per the editors of The Papers of Andrew Johnson, in May 1863, the month following Charles Johnson's death, Robert had been placed on "detached duty, first to raise a brigade, in which he was unsuccessful, and then for unspecified activities at Nashville..." In November 1863, Andrew Johnson wrote to Robert Johnson demanding that he resign entirely from the service of the Union Army:

You tender your resignation, predicated upon my wish for you to do so, and as I obtained the Commission…require you to resign and therefore you do resign...I have not [until now] indicated to you by work or deed any desire or wish on my part, that you Should resign your Commission as Col of the regiment; but on the contrary have expressed myself in the most emphatic terms, that I would rather See you once more yourself again and at the head of your Regiment, going to your own native home, than be possessed by the highest honors which Could be conferred upon me. In this so far, I have been doomed to deep disappointment.

— Andrew Johnson, Papers of Andrew Johnson, Vol. 6, p. 485

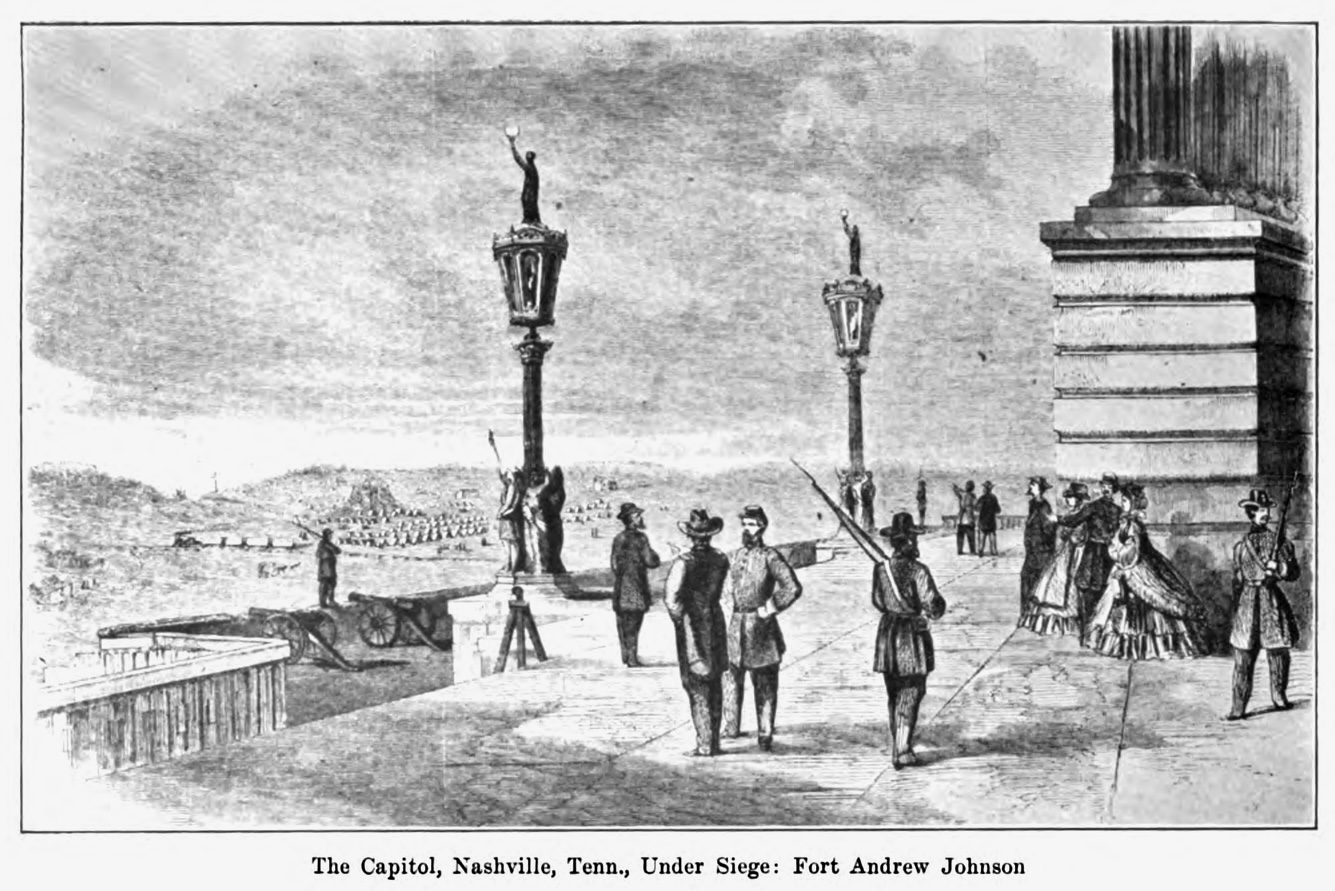
"Fort Andrew Johnson" in Nashville, Tennessee during the American Civil War

Johnson apparently resigned brigade and regimental duties for good in February 1864, stating that it was "for reasons, purely of a private nature." Another account has it that Robert Johnson resigned on May 31, 1864. His resignation letter stated that he had been "solicited to undertake and perform" civilian work and that his departure was in the best interests of the regiment. After the war Johnson was brevetted Brigadier General with rank from March 13, 1865, apparently despite the fact that he was "rarely in command of his regiment and was never in a battle."

In the summer of 1864, as Andrew Johnson was being awarded a spot on Lincoln's national ticket, Robert Johnson and his mother Eliza sought out a temperance reformer and physician in Boston named Dr. Dio Lewis. In January 1865, along with his brother-in-law David T. Patterson, he was one of the 12 Greene County delegates to the Union State Convention that repealed secession, abolished slavery, and restored Tennessee to the United States.

== Presidency of Andrew Johnson ==
=== 1865–1866 ===
According to a letter from Martha Patterson to Andrew Johnson, at the time of the assassination of Abraham Lincoln, Robert was "in his usual condition" and apparently so out of it that he was unaware "of the awful calamity." In June 1865 President Johnson sent a telegram to his old friend Samuel Milligan, "I trust in God you can do something with R— for I have almost despaired. If anyone can exert any influence with him, you can."

As Andrew Johnson settled into the duties of the presidency, apparently his wife Eliza McCardle had Robert Johnson summoned to Washington, D.C. and employed as a personal secretary to the President. Johnson arrived in D.C. on Saturday, August 5, 1865 in the company of Patterson, his widowed sister Mary Stover, and her three children, who were 10, eight and five years old. He was officially appointed Johnson's personal secretary in November 1865, replacing William A. Browning, who had been appointed secretary of legation to Mexico. Per one account, Mrs. Johnson had hoped that under "the personal influence of his sisters and herself would reclaim him but alas she found his new position, in its surroundings, a still heavier dead weight to her hopes. Clever genial 'Bob,' the young man who had the ear of the President at any time, was everybody's friend. A crowd followed him wherever he went. The choicest viands of Willard's and Welcker's (Note: Willard's was a prominent hotel on Pennsylvania Avenue. Welcker's, also on Pennsylvania Avenue, was a restaurant owned by a German immigrant named John Welcker.) were set before him, miniature rivers were made to float with wine..." A different report asserted that it was in the "corrupt and vicious society" of Washington, where Johnson was "petted and popular," that he first contracted serious "habits of dissipation." A third account had it that "he was feted and flattered by those who hoped to use him, and led into habits which eventually rendered him a wreck. He was a good-natured, genial young man, and probably without an enemy in the world save himself." The keepers of Andrew Johnson's presidential papers confirm that during his time in office Robert Johnson was the indeed recipient of countless letters, variously seeking favor, reporting on family, financial, and political news, and/or hoping to communicate with the president through him. On December 5, R. Johnson read to the Congress the 1865 State of the Union; the text had been written by historian George Bancroft.

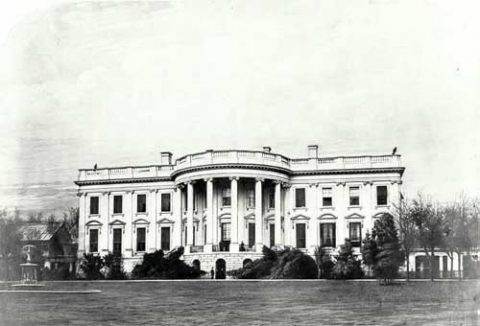
White House photographed by Kerston & Fordham, 1867

Johnson apparently wrote in his diary that he spent December 31, 1865 with "some old friends, drank to the old year." On New Year's Day 1866, Robert Johnson "was ill, and unable to be present" when Andrew Johnson hosted the first grand reception of his administration, in the Blue Room, with his daughters Martha Patterson and Mary Stover as cohostesses. (Note: The event was otherwise attended by diplomats; Army officers, including Ulysses S. Grant; members of the general public who appeared to be of the white race; and then "after two o'clock, such of the colored people as were in waiting outside.") In early 1866 Samuel C. Pomeroy, a U.S. Senator from Kansas, claimed that he had seen Andrew Johnson, David Patterson, and Robert Johnson drunk in the White House; he eventually recanted his claim about the father but refused to withdraw the allegation against the son. Come February of that year, former ambassador Norman B. Judd wrote chairman of the Senate Judiciary Committee Lyman Trumbull:

There is too much whiskey in the White House, and harlots go into the Private Secretary's office unannounced in broad daylight.

On September 1, 1866, Johnson wrote in his diary, "Having fully and determinedly made up my mind to abstain in the future from all intoxicating liquors...and putting my trust in God, I hope to finish the remainder of my life, a sober and respected Member of Society." On Sunday, October 28, 1866, Johnson and his sister Mary rode from the White House in the President's private carriage with the widow of Henry Brown to the funeral of Mr. Brown, who was a "colored servant of the Johnson family for many years past" and who had served with Johnson in the 1st Tennessee Cavalry during the war. In December, the New York Times listed the president's confirmed staff: "President JOHNSON'S household is thus organized, under a law passed by Congress at its last session: Private Secretary, ROBERT JOHNSON; Assistant Secretary, ROBERT MORROW; Secretary to Sign Land Patents, EDWARD D. NEILL; Aid-de-Camps, Col. W. G. MOORE, Lieut.-Col. WRIGHT RIVES, Col. ANDREW K. LONG."

=== 1867–1868 ===
On May 23, 1867, Robert Johnson testified before the Judiciary Committee regarding the administration's presidential pardon process. Johnson was apparently gone from Washington, D.C. from June until October 20, 1867. Per his diary he purchased a quantity of gin on July 14, 1867. On July 15, 1867, he was confined in the Government Hospital for the Insane, and would remain there for three months. It was reported October 3, 1867, that he had been replaced as private secretary by Edmund Cooper of Tennessee.

Apparently while in the Washington, D.C., asylum Robert Johnson was able to host "various young women friends" who came to visit. Andrew Johnson visited his son at the asylum for the first and only time on October 11, and Robert Johnson was released on October 15. On October 27, 1867, Robert Johnson started drinking again, on October 28 he was returned to the asylum, and on November 2, he was released a second time, by request of the president. A Wisconsin newspaper reported that Johnson had returned to work, stating, "He helps his sire sort pardons and taste bourbon." He started drinking again November 5, was again consigned to the asylum, and remained there until November 24, 1867. He departed that day, went to New York City, drank there, eventually returned to the White House, and spent a week hungover.

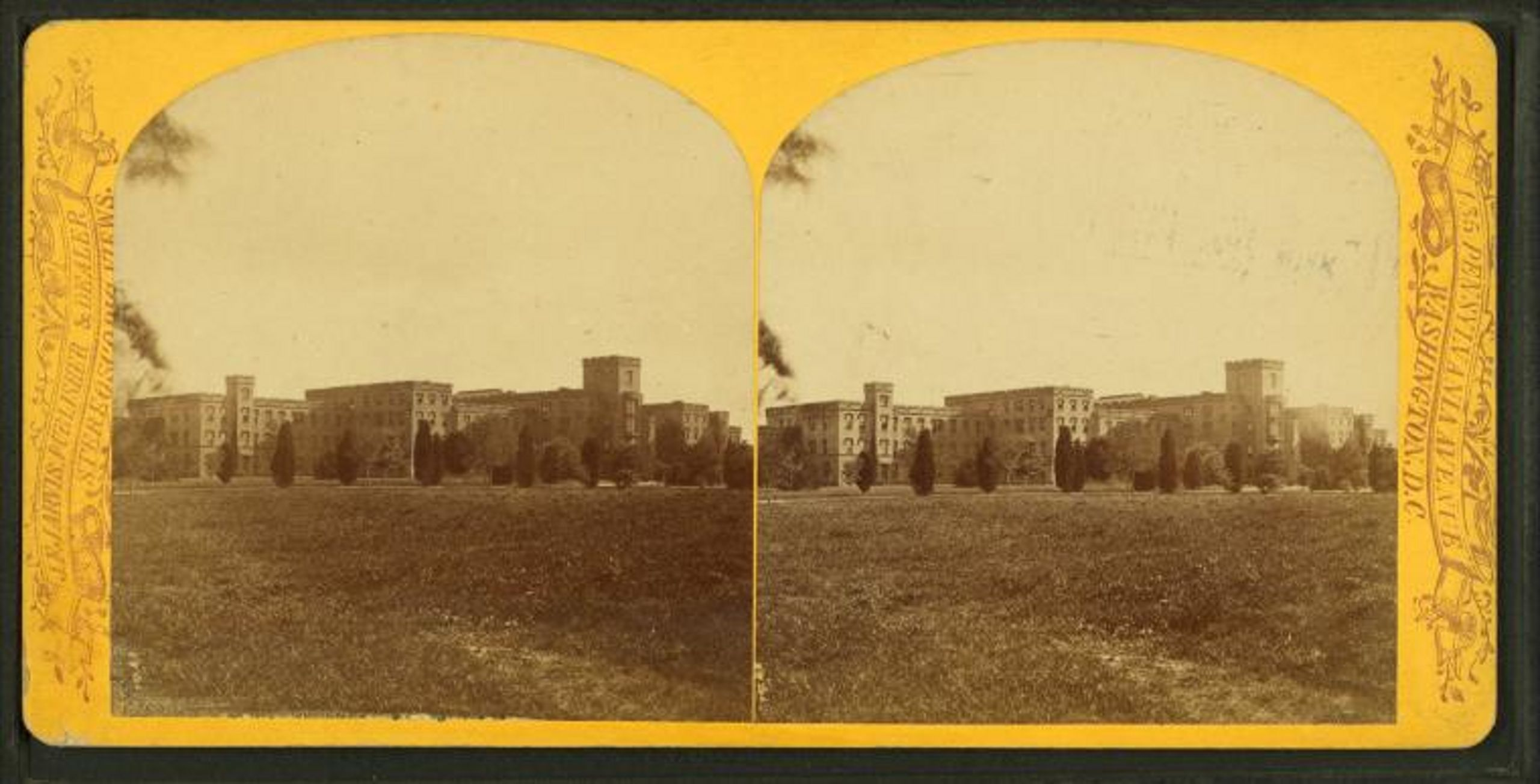
The still-extant Center Building at the Government Hospital for the Insane, now known as St. Elizabeth's, was constructed in 1853 (Stereoscopic view c. 1875 from Robert Dennis Collection, NYPL)

On Tuesday, December 3, 1867, at 12:30, Col. Johnson "reported the President's annual message" (Note: This report is constitutionally required and in this form was a predecessor to the President's annual televised State of the Union address. For the text of the 1867 State of the Union Address, see wikisource:Andrew Johnson's Third State of the Union Address.) to the U.S. House of Representatives. He vowed in his journal to abstain from alcohol for a year, and wrote in his diary on December 13, 1867, "May God...bring me now out of all my troubles and trials and see me enter life with renewed hope and vigor." He was present at Blue Room receptions on both New Year's Day 1868, and January 17, 1868, but as of January 24, 1868, he was reportedly back in the "lunatic asylum of the District of Columbia" for "periodical drunkenness." The full text of this news item suggests that Johnson's alcoholism had at least some impact on his father's political standing, as it references President Johnson's relationship with Secretary of War Edwin Stanton and recommends removal of President Johnson. The impeachment of Andrew Johnson over Johnson's removal of Stanton from the Cabinet began less than a month later.

It was considered worth telegraphing from Washington the other day that Col. Robert Johnson, the son and private Secretary of President Johnson, had announced that "we"—that is the President and his private Secretary—were not going to recognize Mr. Stanton as Secretary of War in any manner whatsoever. We now perceive that "Col. Robert Johnson, son and private Secretary to the President has been placed in the lunatic asylum of Washington, D.C., to cure him if possible of periodical drunkenness, which in his case amounts to insanity." It might be well for the country if the same treatment could be tried in the case of the remainder of "we."

— Manchester Journal, Manchester, Vt., February 28, 1868

After being released from an asylum in August 1868, Robert Johnson was said to have "fully recovered from his temporary insanity." Nonetheless, he apparently resigned as secretary around September 19, and was "going into the practice of law."

== Death ==
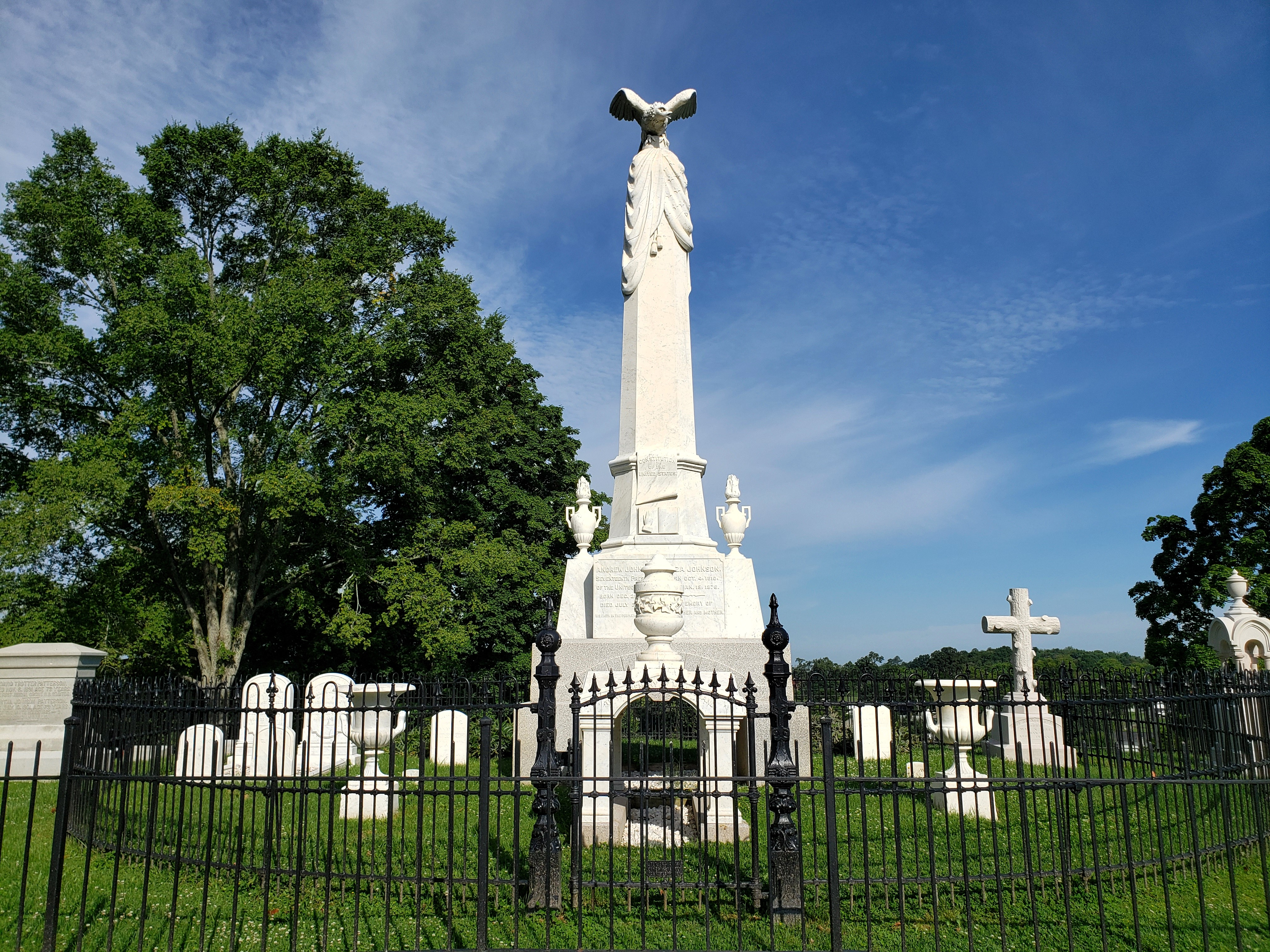
Family burial ground at what is now Andrew Johnson National Cemetery: The twin headstones on the left are for Robert Johnson and his older brother Charles Johnson, who predeceased their parents

For the last year or two of his life, Johnson was said to have been "mentally and physically incapacitated for any public duties by prolonged dissipation," and little was seen or heard of him. He was an inmate of the New York State Inebriate Asylum in Binghamton at the time of the March 4, 1869, presidential inauguration of Ulysses S. Grant. Johnson reportedly left Washington, D.C. for Greeneville on March 18, 1869, traveling with his parents and the Pattersons. About a month later, and two days after his widowed sister Mary's second wedding ceremony, Johnson died of an overdose of alcohol and laudanum. He sent out for a bottle of laudanum, or purchased it himself at a drugstore, the day before he died. It was reported that "for some time past [Johnson had] become habituated to the use of opiates," and the laudanum overdose occurred overnight in his bedroom above the dining room in the family home in Greeneville, Tennessee. Per Bergeron, the accounts of Johnson's death conflict slightly on details, "although much credence has been given to the belief that he committed suicide." According to a newspaper account of 1879, Robert Johnson "was found dead in his bed one morning, having retired as well as usual the evening before." The Chicago Evening Post reported his death with an enigmatic comment: "Col. Robert Johnson, son of ex-President Johnson, died yesterday at Greenville, Tenn. He was a young man of intemperate habits and came by them honestly." A communication to Laura Holloway (a native Tennessean and biographer of First Ladies) provides this narrative:

From a tear-stained letter, we gather these sad particulars. "He was well and on the street at five o'clock, and at dusk, as the servant went as usual, to light his lamp, she discovered that he was in a deep sleep. He was never aroused from it. All the physicians of the village were immediately called in, but alas! too late to do any good. He breathed his last at half-past eleven that night, without a single groan or struggle. ¶ I do not suppose he ever made an enemy in his life. He was certainly the most popular boy ever raised in this part of the country, and continued so after he became a man. Oh, if he could only have spoken one word to us!"

Johnson was initially buried, with a Presbyterian service and full Masonic honors, at the Federal-era Presbyterian Old Harmony Cemetery. He was later reinterred, sometime before 1878, on Monument Hill at Andrew Johnson National Cemetery, beside his older brother Charles Johnson. Ex-President Johnson wrote a letter to his sole surviving son, Frank Johnson, two weeks after Robert Johnson's death and funeral, but made no mention of Bob's passing.

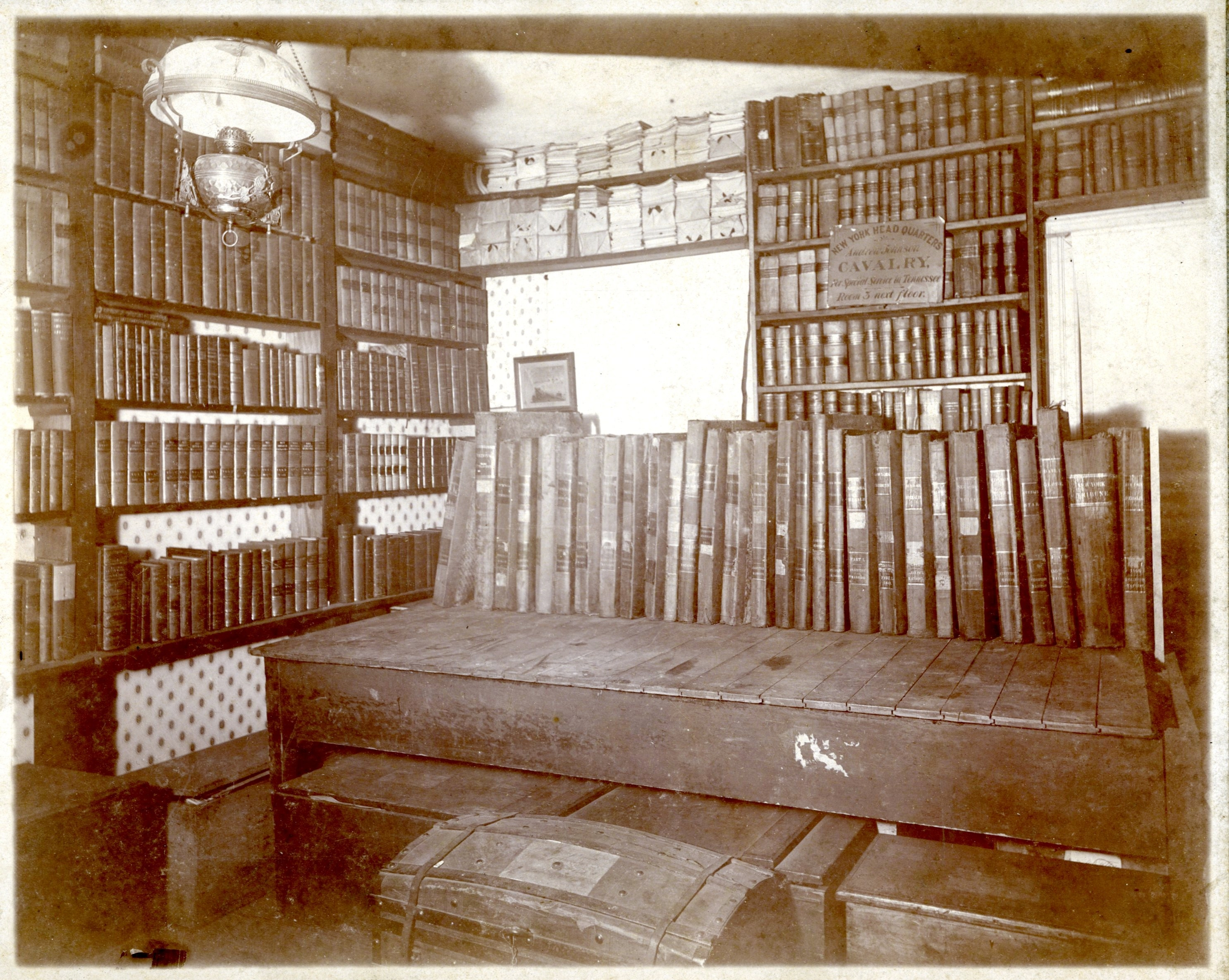
"After Andrew Johnson's son Robert died [in 1869], it appears his room in the second story of the Homestead was turned into Johnson's library. In this room you can see his old tailoring table, made by his brother, William. Most of the rest of the items in this room are now at the Andrew Johnson Museum & Library at Tusculum College." (Photograph reportedly taken 1901; photo and caption from Andrew Johnson National Historic Site)

== Legacy ==
Robert Johnson was remembered by some as a staunch Southern Unionist, and though flawed, "ever generous and chivalrous, a true friend, an affectionate brother and son." Someone who knew him during the war described him as "a young man of naturally good impulses, but weak, and easily influenced and led by others." Another third account described him as having spent his father's term in office as a "miserable drunkard" who often had "severe attacks of delirium tremens."

Col. Johnson appears as a minor villain in a 1878 Confederate novel by Sam Houston Dixon called Texas Refugee. A fictionalized Jim Brownlow plays straight man to the fictionalized Bob Johnson for a chapter. The regiment captures a Confederate town and Johnson demands whiskey from a bartender, who is cousin to Jeff Davis; the bartender refuses. Brownlow tries to keep the peace: "'You can arrange this matter at once by giving the colonel some whisky. He's a very moderate drinker; ten gallons will make him as happy as a lamb and innocent as a dove till morning.'...'Jim,' he said, turning to Brownlow, 'Havn't I the temper of an A No. 1 angel?' 'If you don't know that you're angelically disposed, Bob, it isn't for want of my telling you. I have watched with wondering awe your familiarity and daily intercourse with the spirits.'"

In 1943, the death certificate of William Andrew Johnson, a retired Knoxville pastry chef who had been born in Greeneville in 1858, listed Robert Johnson as "father." Andrew Johnson had legally enslaved Dolly Johnson, William Andrew's mother, from 1843 to 1863.

== See also ==
- Suicide prevention
- Suicide intervention
- List of children of presidents of the United States
- List of American Civil War brevet generals (Union)
- Greeneville Historic District (Greeneville, Tennessee)
- First Presbyterian Church (Greeneville, Tennessee)
- Bibliography of Andrew Johnson
- Andrew Johnson alcoholism debate
