= Confederate oath of allegiance =

Aspect of American Civil War

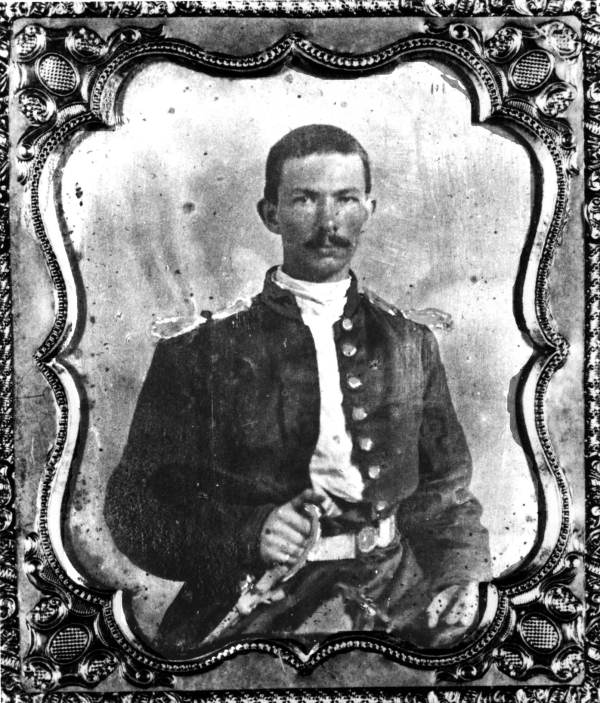
Portrait of William Tell Bartlett, die-hard Confederate loyalist of Tallahassee, Florida: "He would never take the oath of allegiance to the United States of America and was put out of jail as an impossible military prisoner."

The Confederate oath of allegiance, an oath of allegiance to the Confederate States of America, was taken by officers and enlisted men of the CSA (1861–1865) during the American Civil War. In contrast to the American oath of allegiance, Confederates swore "allegiance to the Confederate States without mention of allegiance to their constitution." Confederate oaths varied somewhat by state, and in the spirit of the CSA's proclaimed preference for states' rights over a unified federal government with majority rule and minority rights, Confederate oaths were often made to specific state governments.

The Confederate oath is not to be confused the amnesty oaths made by ex-Confederates after the end of the war, resulting in pardons for ex-Confederates.

== History ==
One oath recorded in Georgia "consisted of two complimentary and equally necessary parts. In the first, the Oath of Abjuration, the signer voluntarily disavows and denies his loyalty to any political entity other than the State of Georgia: 'I do renounce and forever abjure all allegiances and Fidelity to every Sovereign except the State of Georgia...' In the second part of the oath, the oath of Allegiance, the oath-taker swears complete loyalty to the state of Georgia, and Georgia alone."

The 1861 Confederate constitution of Alabama stated, "That the oath of allegiance to this State shall be in the following form, viz: 'I do swear (or affirm) that I will be faithful, and true allegiance bear to the State of Alabama, as long as I may continue a citizen thereof.'...The oath of abjuration shall be in the following form, viz: 'I do swear (or affirm) that I do renounce and forever abjure all allegiance and fidelity to every prince, potentate, state, or sovereignty whatever, except the State of Alabama.'

The Confederate oath was occasionally sworn by civilians whose loyalty was considered dubious and who were thus required to make a pledge attesting to their loyalty. Texas governor Sam Houston refused to take the Confederate oath and was removed from office. Southern Unionist newspaper editor (later Governor of Tennessee and U.S. Senator from Tennessee) William Gannaway Brownlow was imprisoned in Confederate Tennessee on charges of treason and expected to hang because he refused to take the Confederate oath of allegiance (Brownlow was ultimately booted out of the state in lieu of execution). Andrew Johnson's son Charles Johnson and son-in-law David T. Patterson both took Confederate oaths under duress, although the former later joined the Union Army and the latter was described as a "Union man as would put some of us to shame." According to one account of the St. Albans Raid, soldiers administered the Confederate oath of allegiance, at gunpoint, to customers of the bank. American and English Encyclopedia of Law (Vol. 28, 1895) references case law that found "avoidance to take the confederate oath of allegiance" to be substantial evidence of loyalty in wartime.

Some long-term Union Army prisoners-of-war ultimately took oaths to the Confederacy; these men were known as Galvanized Rebels and received work assignments in exchange for their pledges of allegiance.

== See also ==
- Ten percent plan
- Ironclad Oath
