= James Patton Brownlow =

American Union Army officer (1842–1879)

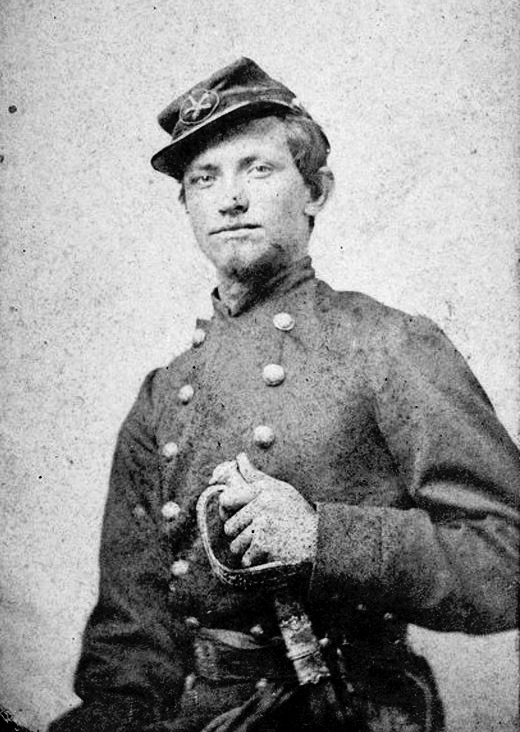
- Brownlow in 1865
- Born: December 17, 1842; Jonesborough, Tennessee, U.S.
- Died: April 26, 1879 (aged 36); Knoxville, Tennessee, U.S.
- Burial place: Rest Haven Cemetery; Franklin, Tennessee, U.S.
- Relatives: Son of Tennessee Governor and U.S. Senator William G. Brownlow, brother of Union Colonel John B. Brownlow
- Military career
- Allegiance: United States
- Branch: Union Army
- Service years: 1861–1868
- Rank: Colonel; Brevet Brigadier General
- Unit: 1st Tennessee Cavalry Regiment
- Conflicts: American Civil War; Battle of the Cumberland Gap; Battle of Chickamauga; Battle of Mossy Creek; Atlanta campaign
- Other work: Printer, farmer, railroad superintendent

James Patton Brownlow (December 17, 1842 – April 26, 1879) was an American Union Army officer during the American Civil War.

Brownlow was the son of East Tennessee preacher and politician Parson Brownlow. James P. Brownlow served in several positions in the Union Army, finishing the war as colonel of the 1st Tennessee Cavalry Regiment. He was noted for his courage and perceptiveness in battle and keen sense of military tactics. Union cavalry in Tennessee, in addition to participating in crucial organized battles of the war, "primarily meant almost endless skirmishing with partisans, guerrillas, and bushwackers, as well as with the Rebel raiders of John Hunt Morgan, Joseph Wheeler, and Nathan Bedford Forrest, who frequently recruited and supplied themselves from behind enemy lines." Jim Brownlow's deft handling of these engagements left him with a reputation as "one of the greatest daredevils of the Civil War."

The United States Senate confirmed the award of the grade of brevet brigadier general of volunteers, to rank from March 13, 1865, to Brownlow on March 12, 1866, at which time he was just 23 years old. After the war, he was adjutant general of the State of Tennessee and then a railroad superintendent. He died in 1879 at the age of 36.

== Early life ==
James Patton Brownlow was born on December 14, 1842, in Jonesborough, Tennessee. He was the son of preacher, newspaper publisher and editor, Governor of Tennessee and United States Senator "Parson" William G. Brownlow and Eliza (O'Brien) Brownlow. He was the younger brother of Colonel John B. Brownlow, commander of the 9th Regiment of Tennessee Volunteer Cavalry (Union). He had five sisters, Susan, Mary, Fannie, and the twins, Annie and Caledonia Temple. Brownlow attended Emory and Henry College in Emory, Virginia. He was called Jim Brownlow by his friends.

== American Civil War ==
In accord with his father and a majority of the residents of eastern Tennessee, James P. Brownlow remained loyal to the Union after the outbreak of the American Civil War. One source shows Brownlow as a private in the Tennessee militia in 1861.

=== Organization; Cumberland Gap campaign, Nashville, Triune ===
Brownlow's regiment was first organized in November 1861 at Camp Garber near Flat Lick, Kentucky, as the 4th Tennessee Infantry (Union). Brownlow joined the U.S. Army as a private. In April 1862, the regiment was supposed to become the 1st Regiment of Tennessee Volunteer Cavalry (Note: Also shown as the 1st East Tennessee Cavalry Regiment and the 1st Tennessee Cavalry Regiment, (U.S.A.)) also at Camp Garber. This transition was delayed until November. James P. Brownlow was elected captain of Company C of the 4th Tennessee Infantry (Union) upon its organization. Robert Johnson, son of former United States Senator, the Military Governor of Tennessee and later President of the United States Andrew Johnson, was the regiment's first colonel. Perhaps complicating matters, the respective fathers of Robert Johnson, age 28, and James P. Brownlow, age 19, had been fierce political enemies for close to 30 years. Another issue was Bob Johnson's drinking; he ultimately "had to leave the military because of an alcohol addiction." Robert Johnson was "rarely in command of his regiment and was never in a battle," and it seems clear that Brownlow led the East Tennessee mountaineers whenever Johnson was absent on a recruiting task or incapacitated by his addiction, which was often.

On April 30, 1862, the regiment became part of Brigadier General James G. Spears's brigade of Brigadier General George W. Morgan's 7th Division of the Army of the Ohio. At this time, it continued to operate as the 4th Tennessee Infantry. On July 30, 1862, Major General Don Carlos Buell declined Military Governor of Tennessee Andrew Johnson's request to mount the regiment. The regiment had been participating in Brigadier General George W. Morgan's Cumberland Gap Campaign and was camped near the gap until Morgan had to withdraw in September 1862.

Brownlow had shown his leadership during this campaign and while on guard duty in Virginia east of the gap. On August 1, 1862, Brownlow became lieutenant colonel of the regiment. On September 17, 1862, General Morgan abandoned Cumberland Gap because Confederate forces were converging on his men and they were in danger of being cut off from supplies and reinforcements. They retreated to Ohio, harassed by Confederate cavalry much of the way. On November 1, 1862, the designation of the regiment was finally changed to 1st Regiment of Tennessee Volunteer Cavalry. In January 1863, the regiment moved to Nashville, Tennessee, to begin operations in their home state.

On February 1, 1863, Lt. Colonel Brownlow led the regiment on a scout to Franklin, Tennessee, 18 miles (29 km) south of Nashville, where his regiment inflicted some casualties, took some prisoners and quickly returned to Nashville. In late February, Brownlow led a reconnaissance to Triune, Tennessee, 21 miles (34 km) south-east of Nashville, after being temporarily assigned as the only cavalry regiment in Brigadier General James B. Steedman's division. The 1st Tennessee took about 100 prisoners and cleared the area sufficiently so that the division could spend until June 1863 encamped at Triune. According to a history of the 14 Union cavalry regiments from Tennessee:

Instead of going himself, Johnson, as was his habit, deployed a detachment under Lieutenant Colonel Brownlow. Riding out at night, Brownlow forded the Harpeth River and found only small enemy squads toward Chapel Hill. As Brownlow returned at dawn near the Harpeth, graycoats concealed along the pike fired, yelled, and rushed his rear guard, hoping to panic the entire column. But he quickly formed a line of battle and fired volley after volley. As the Johnny Rebs fell back, Brownlow led a saber charge—as would become his practice—that broke through their line. He then pursued them for three miles. Brownlow returned to camp with about a hundred prisoners, some with saber wounds.

— James Alex Baggett, Homegrown Yankees: Tennessee's Union Cavalry in the Civil War (2009), page 71

The regiment skirmished with Confederates camped nearby all winter and often took prisoners during these skirmishes.

=== Promotion, Tullahoma, Chickamauga, Chattanooga ===
On May 31, 1863, Colonel Johnson resigned due to "ill health" and Brownlow was immediately promoted to colonel of the 1st Regiment of Tennessee Volunteer Cavalry (Union). In June 1863, Major General David S. Stanley organized the Cavalry Corps of the Army of the Cumberland. Brigadier General Robert B. Mitchell commanded the corps, Colonel (later Brigadier General) Edward M. McCook commanded the First Division and Colonel A. P. Campbell commanded the 1st Brigade, to which the 1st Tennessee Volunteer Cavalry Regiment was assigned. In that month, Major General William Rosecrans began the Tullahoma Campaign which forced the Confederates to abandon that town and retreat to Chattanooga. Brownlow's regiment covered the retreat of the Union Army to Chattanooga after the Battle of Chickamauga, September 19–20, 1863. He was said to have been at the battles of Shelbyville and Chickamauga, "in both of which he distinguished himself with his wonderous bravery, leading his regiment with his sabre."

On September 30, 1863, Confederate Major General Joseph Wheeler began a ride around the Union Army in an effort to cut their communications and supplies in support of Confederate General Braxton Bragg's siege of Chattanooga. Brownlow's regiment joined in the pursuit of Wheeler's force, riding over 300 miles (480 km) in eight days. A few days later, on October 12, 1863, Campbell's brigade made an attack at nightfall in the rain on Confederate Brigadier General Philip D. Roddey's Division, which soon disengaged and moved to a camp away from the battlefield. The regiment removed to Winchester, Tennessee, to rest and re-equip. Then on November 25, 1863, the 1st Tennessee Cavalry engaged the Confederate 25th Tennessee Infantry Regiment and Confederate guerrillas at Sparta, Tennessee, eventually driving them off. In early December, they were joined by the other regiments of their brigade.

=== Knoxville campaign ===
On December 7, 1863, McCook's First Division of the Army of the Cumberland Cavalry Corps headed for Knoxville, where the Union garrison under Major General Ambrose Burnside was threatened by the corps of Confederate Lieutenant General James Longstreet, which had been detached from General Braxton Bragg's army. On December 15, the division reached Knoxville and McCook allowed the 1st Tennessee Cavalry to be the first regiment to enter the home town of Colonel Brownlow and many of the men. Burnside had just been relieved as commander of the Union forces at Knoxville by Brigadier General John G. Foster. Longstreet's attack on Knoxville had been repulsed on November 29, 1863, and he moved his force into upper east Tennessee to camp for the winter. McCook's division pursued Longstreet. On December 24, 1863, Campbell's brigade and an artillery battery were ordered to attack a Confederate force at Dandridge. The Confederates had left Dandridge and taken up a position about 4 miles (6.4 km) to the east at Hays Ferry where the 1st Tennessee Cavalry became heavily engaged in support of Colonel Garrard's cavalry brigade from the Army of the Ohio. During the day, the regiment lost 11 killed and 7 wounded before it withdrew to New Market, Tennessee.

On November 16, 1863, Brigadier General Washington Lafayette Elliott replaced Major General David S. Stanley as Chief of Cavalry of the Army of the Cumberland. When McCook's division moved to Knoxville, Brigadier General Samuel D. Sturgis of the Army of the Ohio took command of the division because he had taken command of all cavalry operating in East Tennessee on December 15, 1863.

On December 29, 1863, Brigadier General Sturgis learned that a brigade of Confederate cavalry had moved to Dandridge and sent most of the cavalry opposite Confederate Lieutenant General Longstreet's encampment to destroy it. He left only Campbell's brigade to hold the camp and valley at Mossy Creek, Tennessee. Campbell positioned his regiments and three cannons of Lilly's battery which had not been sent on the mission to Dandridge in the valley. A large Confederate force moved to attack Campbell's regiments, which fell back because they were outnumbered. Then, Colonel Campbell ordered the 1st Tennessee Cavalry to charge the Confederates on the right of a brick house, a prominent feature on the field. The 1st Tennessee Cavalry made the charge and halted the advance of the entire Confederate line while the 2d Michigan Cavalry, which was fighting dismounted, staggered the Confederate line with rifle fire. Campbell then again ordered his advance regiments to fall back and take a position near Lilly's battery and the 9th Pennsylvania Cavalry, fighting as they moved back. Despite Colonel Campbell's misgivings, Colonel Brownlow assumed responsibility of ordering a saber charge on the advancing Confederate line of battle. The charge drove the Confederates back and the 1st Tennessee took 26 prisoners. However, they in turn were forced back by the superior number of Confederate attackers. The outnumbered Union force was reinforced at a critical moment and together with the reinforcements, Campbell's men forced the Confederates from the field. The 1st Tennessee Cavalry suffered 9 killed and 9 wounded in the battle. A Memphis paper incorrectly reported Brownlow killed in action after the Mossy Creek action.

=== Fair Garden capture and escape ===
After the Battle of Mossy Creek, the Union forces withdrew to Knoxville. After a brief expedition to fight Native Americans (Indians) and guerrillas from North Carolina in Cocke County, Tennessee, Colonels Brownlow and Palmer with about one thousand men of the 1st Tennessee Cavalry, 15th Pennsylvania Cavalry and 10th Ohio Cavalry held the army's right wing, watching for arrival of a Confederate force reportedly approaching East Tennessee from North Carolina. Confederate Brigadier General William T. Martin marched his army across the country from Dandridge and went into camp near Fair Garden, Tennessee. This unexpected movement of Longstreet's cavalry made it necessary to push forward the divisions of McCook and Wolford from Knoxville to support the right wing. Late in the afternoon of January 26, 1864, the Confederates under General Martin were discovered advancing toward Sevierville on the Fair Garden road. McCook's division was ordered to meet this force. Campbell's brigade moved to strike the Confederates behind the east fork of the Pigeon River but after an artillery duel, nightfall halted the engagement.

In the renewed engagement of January 27, 1864, as nightfall approached, Colonel Brownlow became separated from his men while pursuing Confederates who had been driven from the field. Brownlow was taken prisoner. He hid his grade (rank) and identity from his captors, claiming to be a private, and managed to bribe a guard with a gold watch to permit him to escape. His men were greatly relieved when he returned to camp the next day. Then, the Union troops fell back to Sevierville and on January 29, 1864, the Union cavalry went into camp at Maryville, Tennessee, 16 miles (26 km) south of Knoxville.

=== Atlanta campaign and McCook's raid ===
On February 10, 1864, McCook's division left for Cleveland, Tennessee, to rejoin the Army of the Cumberland and to go into camp at that location until May. At Cleveland, the 8th Iowa Cavalry replaced the 9th Pennsylvania Cavalry in the First Brigade of the First Division of the Cavalry Corps of the Army of the Cumberland. On May 3, 1864, the brigade left Cleveland to take part in the Atlanta campaign. During sharp skirmishing and maneuvering in early May 1864, the 1st Tennessee Cavalry took an important position at Potato Hill. A campaign of maneuver and probing operations had begun. On May 26, 1864, the 1st Tennessee Cavalry took 72 prisoners and captured a courier with orders detailing Confederate General Joseph E. Johnston's next move. On June 3, 1865, Colonel Brownlow led his men on a charge which drove back a Confederate force holding a high hill at Acworth, Georgia. Brownlow's men kept possession of the hill which was then occupied by Union Army artillery and called "Brownlow's Hill" in honor of the 1st Tennessee Cavalry's commander. The regiment continued to move forward, skirmishing and occupying positions closer to Atlanta. By June 15, 1864, they had reached Lost Mountain, near Kennesaw Mountain, Georgia, and fought a sharp engagement just to get inside the Confederate first line of defense. On June 18, 1864, the 1st Tennessee Cavalry drove Confederate forces back to within 5 miles (8.0 km) of Marietta, Georgia. In an assault on Kennesaw Mountain on June 27, 1865, where Colonel Daniel McCook, Jr., cousin of cavalry division commander Edward M. McCook, was mortally wounded.

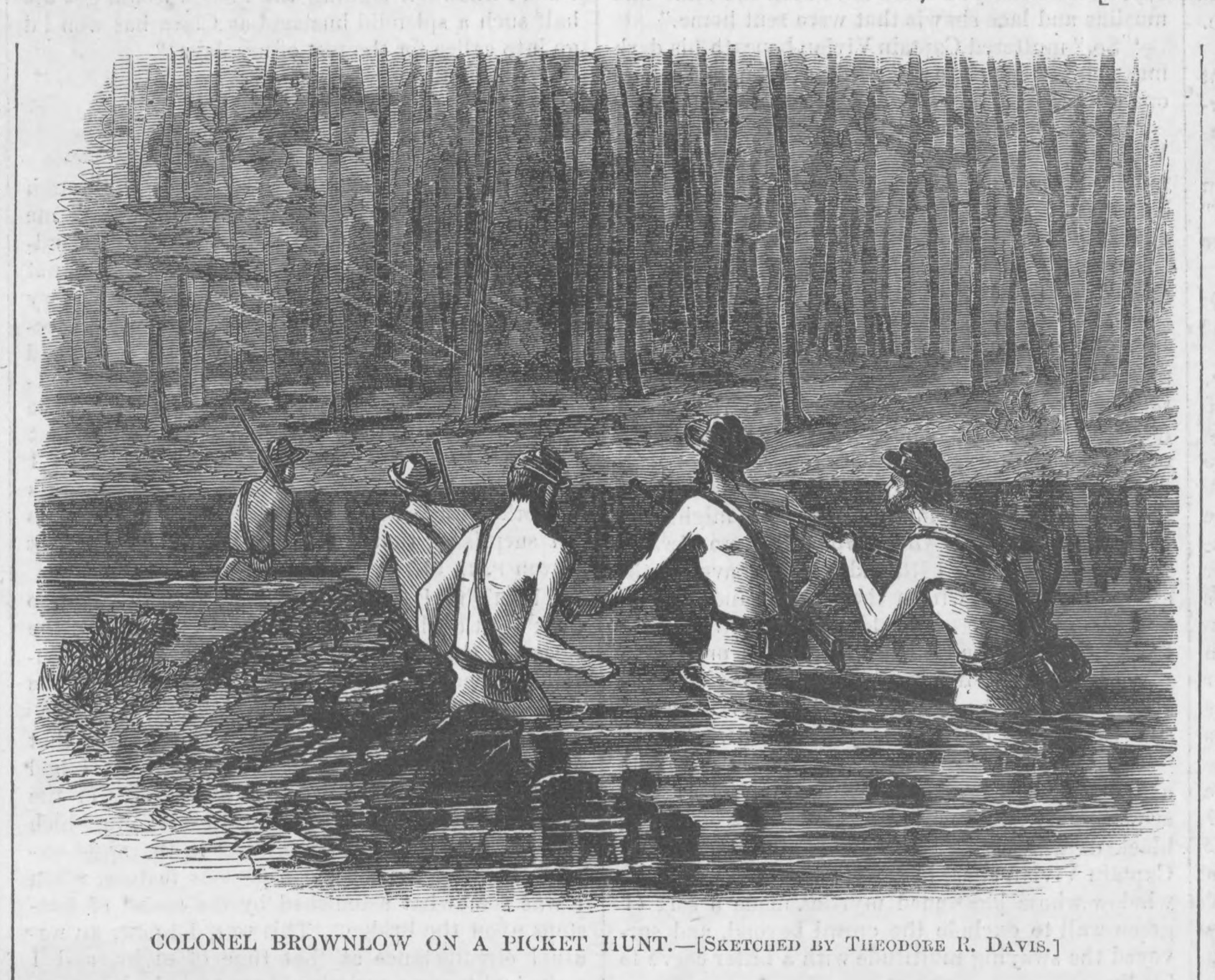
Colonel Brownlow on a Picket Hunt — Sketched by Theodore R. Davis (Harper's Weekly, August 13, 1864): Another illustration on this page represents Colonel Jim Brownlow with a small party of men in Georgia costume, crossing the Chattahoochee to capture the rebel pickets. The expedition was a successful one, but it broke up the friendly communication which had been for several days established between the pickets across the river. This was before SHERMAN had crossed. The morning after the occurrence notice was given of the changed situation by a Reb yelling out across the stream: "Hello, Yank!" "What do you want, Johnny?" "Can't talk to you'uns any more!" "How is that?" "Orders to dry up!" "What for, Johnny?" "Oh! Jim Brownlow, with his d-d Tennessee Yanks, swam over upon the left last night, and stormed our rifle-pits naked—captured sixty of our boys, and made 'em swim back with him. We 'uns have got to keep you'uns on your side of the river now."

On July 4, 1864, General Johnston pulled his forces back over the Chattahoochee River and had almost all the ferry boats for miles in either direction destroyed. The fords were impassable because of heavy spring rains. McCook's division remained near Soap Creek guarding the ferries. They exchanged gunfire from time to time with Confederates occupying rifle pits on the other side of the Chattahoochee. On July 9, 1864, Brownlow's men were ordered to dislodge them and attempted to do so at a supposed ford near Power's Ferry. They found the river impassable. Colonel Joseph Dorr of the 8th Iowa Cavalry Regiment, acting commander of the brigade, arrived on the scene and ordered Brownlow to complete the mission. Brownlow then devised one of the most unusual raids of the Civil War, if not in all military history. He had most of his men keep up a steady fire from their side of the shore while he led a squad of nine men to a point about 1 mile (1.6 km) upstream where they put their guns and cartridge boxes on a small wooden raft and swam naked across the Chattahoochee. Leaving one man to guard the raft, Brownlow led his naked men through the woods. As they somewhat painfully proceeded without shoes or other clothing for cover, Brownlow ordered them to "cuss low" so as not to give themselves away. When they reached the Confederate positions, they emerged, clothed only with cartridge boxes, screaming and shooting. The scene so startled the Confederate defenders that most of them immediately fled into the woods, leaving 12 men to be taken prisoner. After swimming back across the river, Brownlow's men expressed even more admiration for their commander who was willing to share the hardships and dangers of the mission and not just to order others to carry out the unusual and uncomfortable task. In an official report to his commander, McCook described the raid as one of Brownlow's "characteristic feats" and "a very successful raid for naked men to make."

On July 9, 1864, General Johnston pulled back to Peachtree Creek and the Union forces soon crossed the Chattahoochee River near Power's Ferry. On July 17, 1864, Confederate General John B. Hood relieved General Joseph E. Johnston of command of the Confederate forces defending Atlanta. Hood attacked the Union Army positions several times and suffered numerous casualties over the next several days before taking a more defensive posture.

On July 25, 1864, the commander of the Atlanta Campaign, Union Major General William T. Sherman ordered General McCook to lead a raid south of Atlanta toward Fayetteville, Georgia with the objective of destroying 2 miles (3.2 km) to 5 miles (8.0 km) of the Atlanta and West Point Railroad, Macon and Western Railroad and telegraph lines. Union Brigadier General George Stoneman, whose division was to participate in the raid. also wanted to free the Union Army prisoners at the Andersonville and Macon prisoner of war camps. McCook led 5,000 men against the Atlanta and Western and Stoneman led 3,500 men against the Macon and Western. On July 27, 1864, McCook moved his division back across the Chattahoochee River and then around to the south. Now part of Brigadier General John T. Croxton's brigade, the 1st Tennessee Cavalry reached Palmetto Station, Georgia and about 3:00 p.m. and began to destroy telegraph facilities, the depot and supplies. By 9:00 pm., the force moved toward Lovejoy Station, Georgia, which they reached by dawn the next morning. Then, the 1st Tennessee Cavalry captured a 500–wagon train and turned it over to the rear guard to be destroyed. By 7:00 p.m., the regiment began to destroy facilities at Lovejoy Station. General McCook waited until 2:00 p.m. in an effort to communicate with General Stoneman and, failing to hear from Stoneman, McCook left just as Confederate Major General Joseph Wheeler's cavalry approached. Wheeler's men cut off Croxton's brigade and the brigade, including the 1st Tennessee Cavalry, had to fight their way out, taking several casualties.

The brigade reached Newnan, Georgia, about 10:00 a.m. on July 30, 1864, and started to destroy the Atlanta and Western Railroad and telegraph facilities. McCook soon found his division confronted by a larger force of Confederate cavalry and infantry. Even after driving the Confederates back, McCook's men were nearly surrounded. McCook called his commanders together and discussed the possibility of surrender. Brownlow said he would be "damned if he would surrender" because Southern Unionists were treated worse by the Confederates than Northerners. Brownlow led the brigade in an effort to escape with Croxton coming with him. McCook headed for Marietta by another route. The brigade was scattered and Brownlow took command of those with him. He found a small bridge and an escape route from the imminent battle and his remaining force got ahead of the Confederate pursuers. They reached the Chattahoochee River at Rotherwood about 1:00 a.m. on July 31 and started crossing in two small canoes. Some troopers swam the river with their horses and Brownlow swam back and forth several times to help men across. About 200 to 300 men had made the river crossing when Confederates appeared and began to attack and take many of the exhausted and surprised men as prisoners. Many of those who had got across the river could not get their horses across, and the group was still about 75 miles (121 km) from Marietta so they were at great risk of being captured. Brownlow and a small group of men from several regiments got to Marietta on August 1 and others began to arrive on August 2. Many of McCook's men straggled into Marietta by August 10, but Stoneman and several hundred of his men were captured trying to free the Union prisoners at Macon. Thus, Colonel Brownlow briefly commanded the first brigade of the first division of the Army of the Cumberland from July 30, 1864 to August 12, 1864.<refBoatner, Mark M. III (1988). The Civil War Dictionary (Revised ed.). New York: David McKay. p. 93. ISBN 978-0-8129-1726-0.</ref> This was during the period of the escape of the brigade from being nearly surrounded at Newnan and the soldiers straggling back to Marietta.

=== Nashville, wounded during Wheeler's raid at Franklin, end of the war ===
By August 12, Brigadier General Croxton was back and in command of the brigade. He was ordered to turn his brigade's remaining horses over to the other brigades and to take his men to Nashville for refitting. Soon after they arrived in Nashville and were refitted, Croxton's brigade had to face Confederate Major General Joseph Wheeler's force which had detached from the main Confederate Army of Tennessee and were raiding into Tennessee. Croxton's men moved out of Nashville on the night of August 31, 1864. Colonel Brownlow's regiment was ordered to take the advance. On September 1, 1864, the 1st Tennessee Cavalry engaged men of Wheeler's force who were trying to destroy the railroad near Lavergne, Tennessee. Wheeler was able to do little damage to the Nashville and Chattanooga Railroad, and so he turned his attention to the Nashville and Decatur Railroad at Franklin, Tennessee. Croxton's brigade arrived at Franklin just ahead of Wheeler. Brownlow's men dismounted and reached the crest of a hill just before Wheeler's men arrived at the same place. Brownlow was wounded in both thighs while leading his men into the Confederate force. Brownlow was said to have pressed Wheeler so hard that he captured his cap. Brownlow had to be carried from the field and almost bled to death before surgeons saved him. It was during his recovery from the bullet wounds, at the home of Dr. Daniel Bonaparte Cliffe, that he met his future wife, Bell Cliffe. From this time until April 1865, the regiment was commanded by Lieutenant Colonel Calvin M. Dyer. Croxton drew his men back but Wheeler was forced to withdraw when Union infantry arrived at the battle. On September 5, Wheeler began to withdraw into Alabama. Atlanta fell to Sherman's forces while Croxton's men were at Nashville and Franklin.

The 1st Tennessee Cavalry carried on from this date without Colonel Brownlow and had several more engagements or operations. As the war wound down to a conclusion, the 1st Tennessee Cavalry made a reconnaissance from Waterloo, Alabama as far as Corinth, Mississippi, starting on January 27, 1865. They returned to Nashville on February 10, 1865, where they remained until mustered out on June 14, 1865, having recently been rejoined by Colonel Brownlow.

== Post-war and family ==
On October 3, 1865, Brownlow married Margaret Isabella "Belle" Cliffe. The Parson officiated. Belle had been educated at the Vermillion Institute and was noted for her beauty and warmth. On January 13, 1866, President of the United States Andrew Johnson nominated Brownlow for the award of the honorary grade of brevet brigadier general of volunteers, to rank from March 13, 1865. The United States Senate confirmed the award on March 12, 1866. During the Civil War Brownlow participated in 70 battles and skirmishes and had four horses killed under him. He was said to be "the idol of his company and regiment. General Morgan held him in the highest esteem...Generals Rosecrans, Schofield, and Grainger spoke in the highest terms of his bravery."

After the war, James P. Brownlow became adjutant general of the state of Tennessee after the election of his father as governor of Tennessee. He wrote: Report of the Adjutant General of the State of Tennessee of the Military Forces of the State from 1861 to 1866. In December 1866, Brownlow received an appointment at the grade of captain in the 8th United States Cavalry Regiment of the Regular Army. He delayed reporting because of his state duties and ultimately resigned in 1868 because he was posted to California and did not wish to be that far from Tennessee. His occupations thereafter included railroad superintendent for the Knoxville and Kentucky Railroad, farmer and printer.

Belle Cliffe Brownlow died on May 24, 1878 of a "congestive chill" after two days' illness. Jim Brownlow fell ill in early 1879 and had "complications from diseases involving heart and lungs." After a "protracted illness," Brownlow died at his parents' home in Knoxville, Tennessee, on April 26, 1879, aged 36. He is buried in Rest Haven Cemetery, Franklin, Tennessee alongside his late wife and their two infants who predeceased them. One obituary described him as a "man of Herculean stature, measuring six feet six inches in height, [he] was in every respect a gallant soldier and courteous gentleman."

== Additional images ==
Col. Jim Brownlow
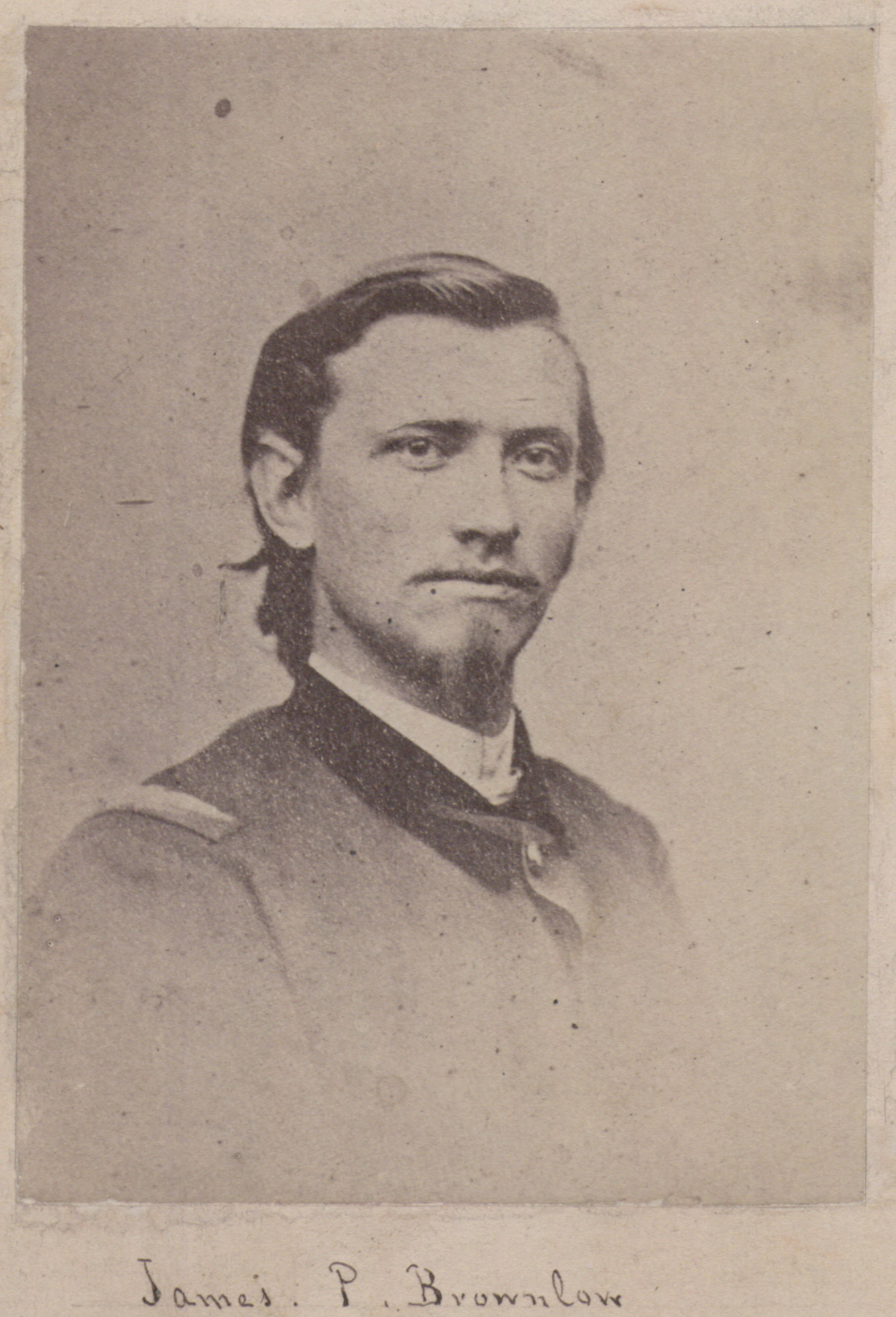
James P. Brownlow

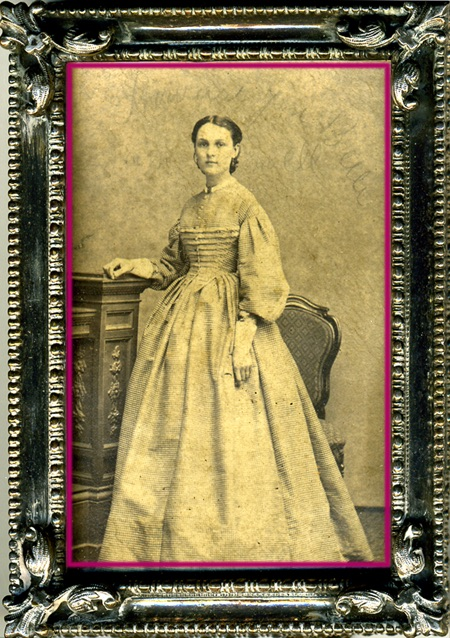
Belle Cliffe Brownlow (1849-1878)

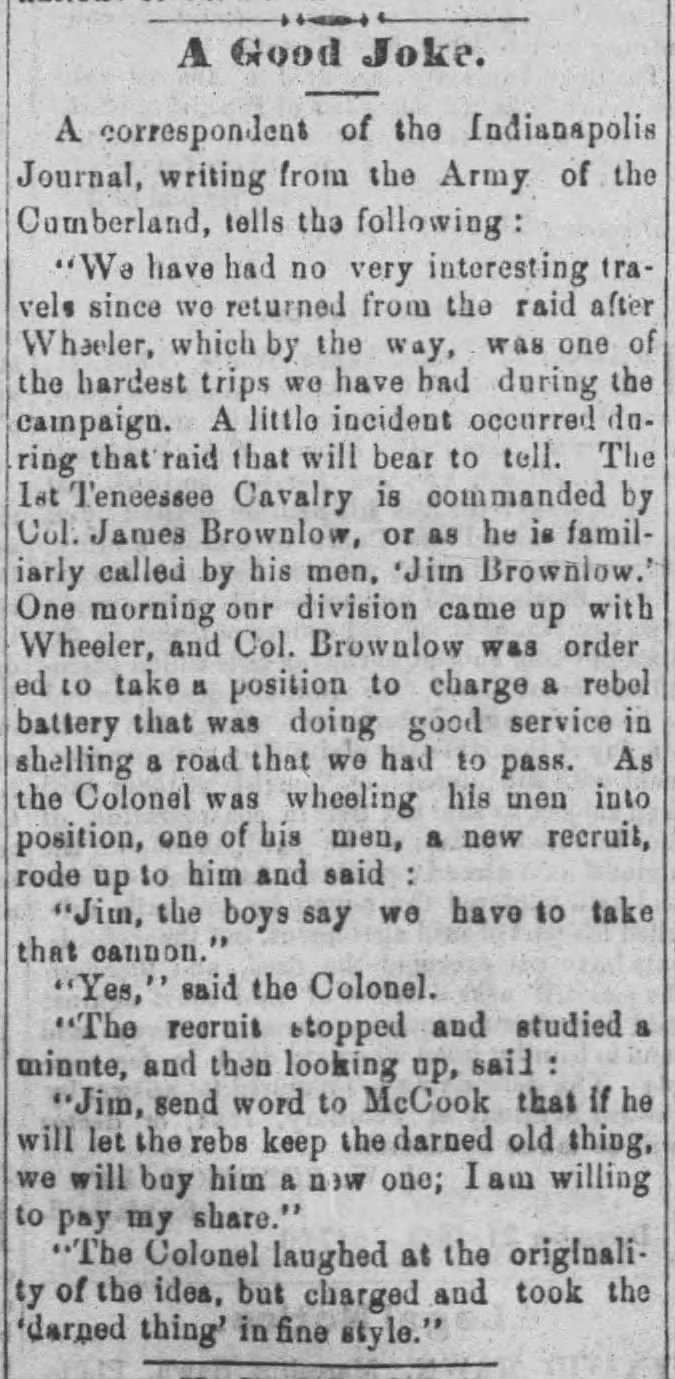
"A Good Joke" (Weekly Marysville Tribune, December 23, 1863)

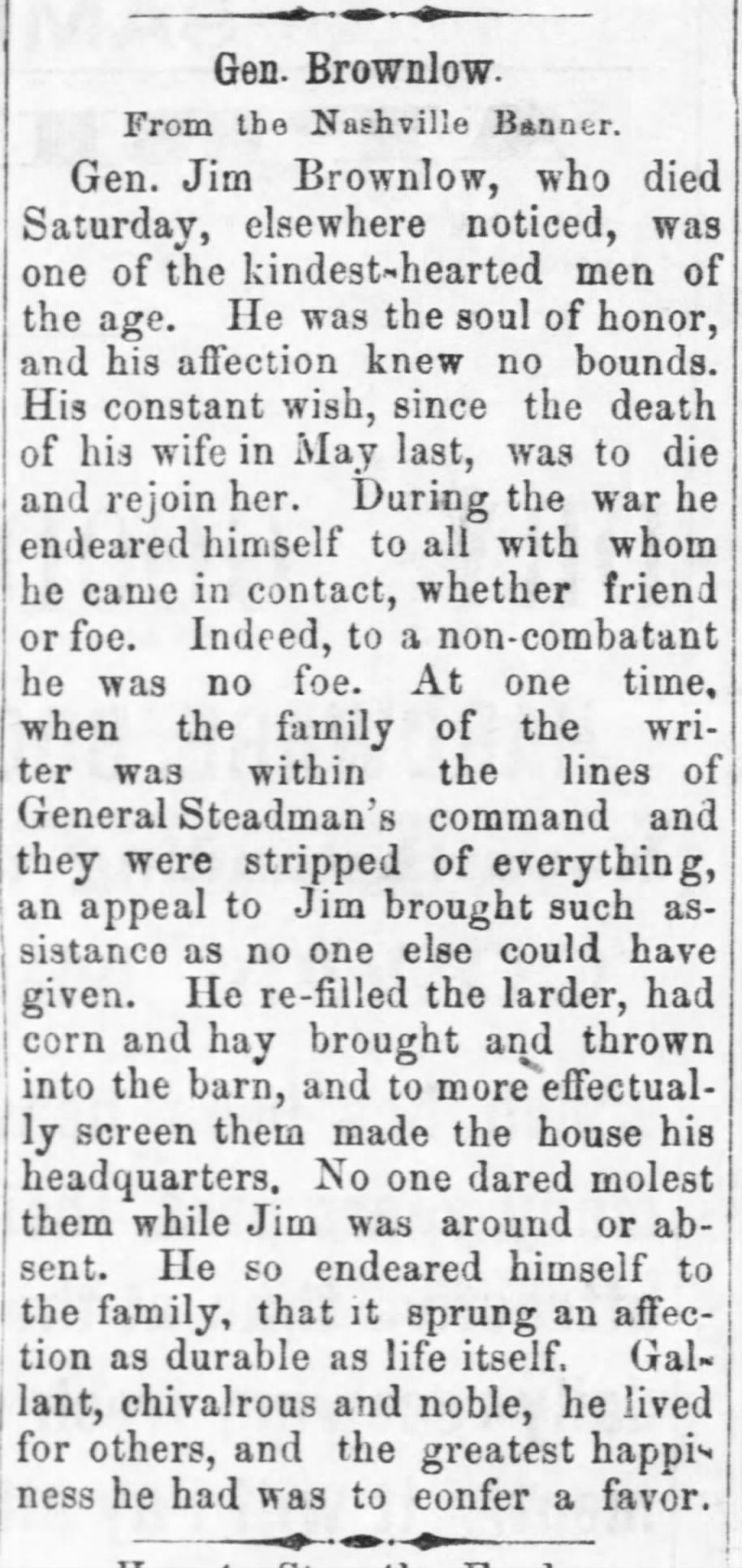
Knoxville Daily Chronicle, May 1, 1879

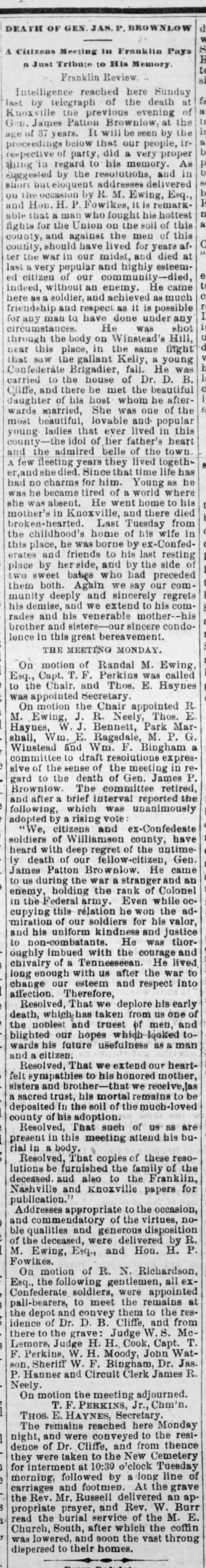
Knoxville Whig and Chronicle, May 7, 1879
