= Franklin City Cemetery =

Historic cemetery in Tennessee, United States

- U.S. National Register of Historic Places
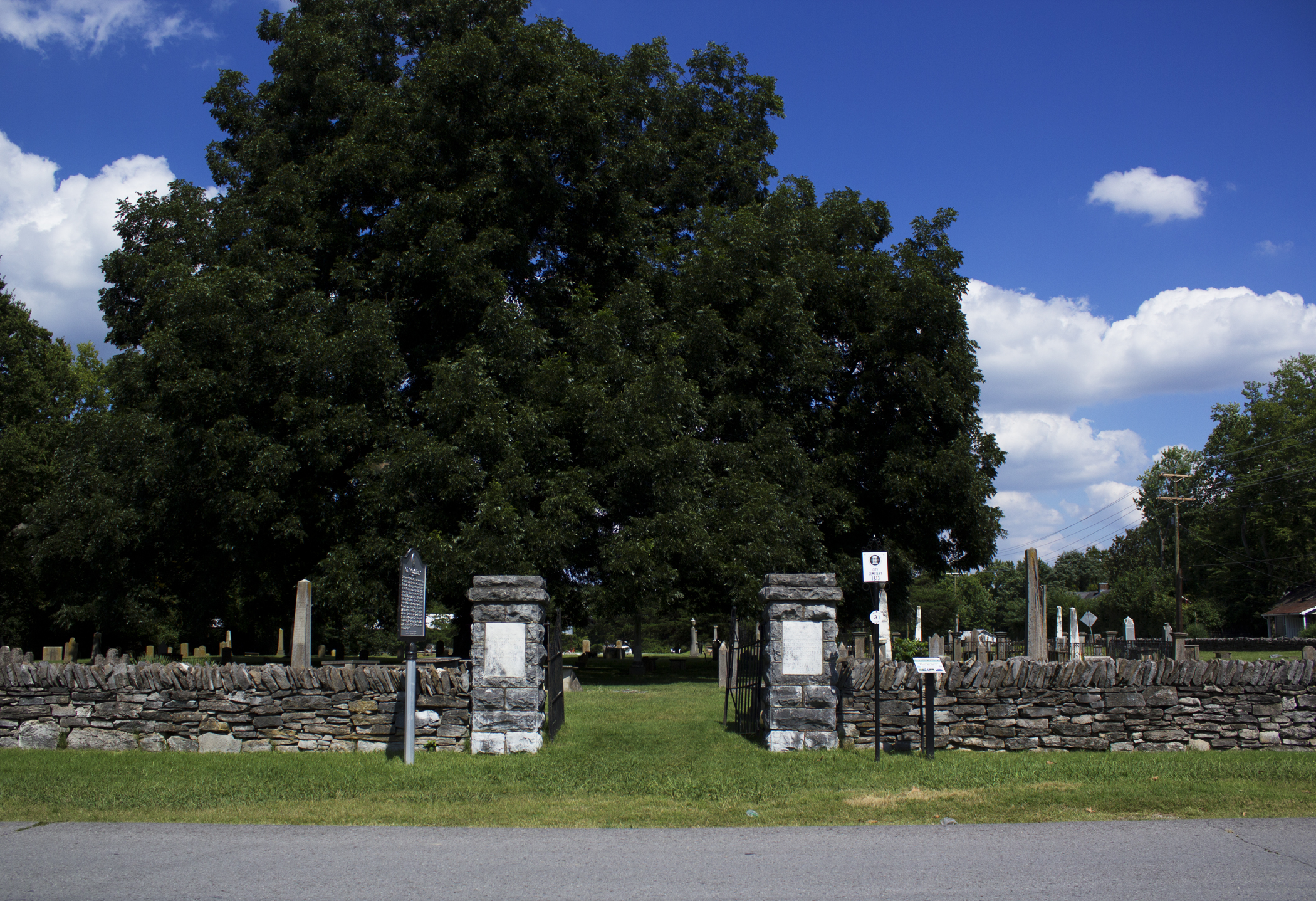

- Location within Tennessee Location within the United States
- Location: N. Margin St. between 3rd & 4th Aves. N., Franklin, Tennessee
- Coordinates: 35°55′41″N 86°52′18″W
- Area: 2 acres (0.81 ha)
- NRHP reference No.: 12000946
- Added to NRHP: November 14, 2012

The Franklin City Cemetery in Franklin, Tennessee, was listed on the National Register of Historic Places in 2012.

Four American Revolutionary War veterans are buried there. The cemetery is significant for its history of early settlers and for its funerary markers, the most unusual of which is perhaps a "treestone" one.

It is across North Margin Street from Rest Haven Cemetery, also NRHP-listed in 2012.
