= Henry Johnson (Tennessee) =

Formerly enslaved man (~1844–1890)

Henry Johnson (c.1844 – December 5, 1890) was a Tennessean who was once enslaved by Andrew Johnson. Johnson purchased Henry in 1857 for US$1,050 (equivalent to $36,281 in 2025), when Henry was approximately 13 years old. Unlike Sam, Dolly, Liz, Florence and William, Johnson does not appear to be enumerated on the 1860 slave schedule as property of Andrew Johnson. Johnson emancipated all of his personal slaves on August 8, 1863.

In 1864 and 1865, when Andrew Johnson was military governor of Tennessee, he "claimed pay toward wages, rations, and clothing for three servants: Henry, Florence, and Elizabeth (Liz)." Henry worked at the White House during the Johnson administration. He may be conflated in some historical accounts with Henry Brown, who was likely an older man and who died of cholera in Washington, D.C. in 1866.

In later life Henry Johnson worked at the United States Post Office in Knoxville, where he died at approximately age 46.

== See also ==
- Andrew Johnson and slavery
- African Americans in Tennessee
