= Rest Haven Cemetery =

Historic cemetery in Tennessee, United States

- U.S. National Register of Historic Places
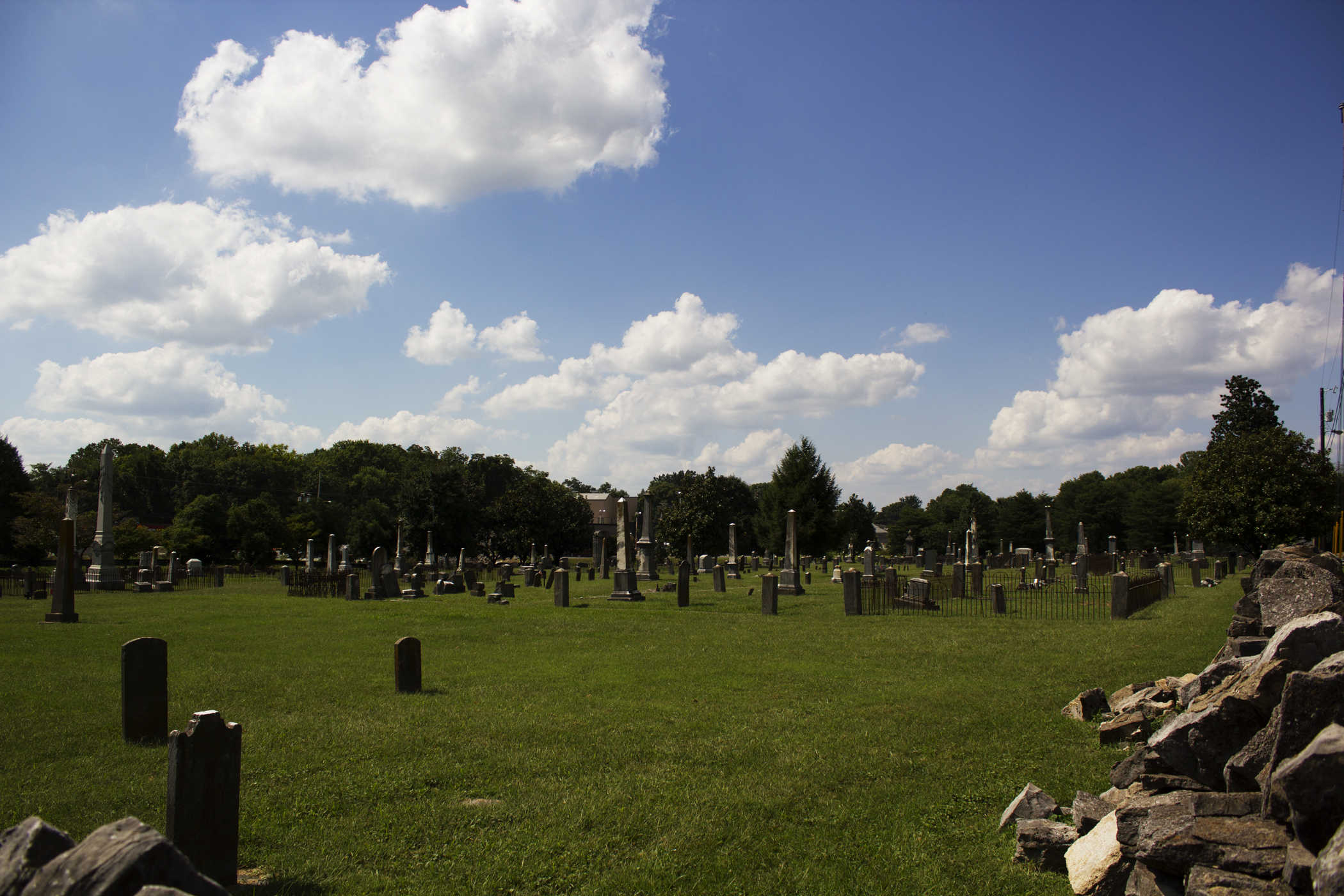

- Location within Tennessee Location within the United States
- Location: N. Margin St. between 4th & 5th Aves. N., Franklin, Tennessee
- Coordinates: 35°55′38″N 86°52′23″W
- Area: 7 acres (2.8 ha)
- Built: 1855
- NRHP reference No.: 12000947
- Added to NRHP: November 14, 2012

The Rest Haven Cemetery in Franklin, Tennessee is a 7-acre (2.8 ha) cemetery that was listed on the National Register of Historic Places in 2012.

It is significant in the history of Franklin. The cemetery was formally founded in 1855 but has some earlier burials, as early as 1841. It has 475 documented graves, including those of 66 Confederate Civil War soldiers. Among the Civil War veterans is Union Brevet Brigadier General, James Patton Brownlow who died at Knoxville, Tennessee, United States (1841–1879).

It is across North Margin Street from Franklin City Cemetery, also NRHP-listed in 2012.
