= 1st Tennessee Cavalry Regiment =

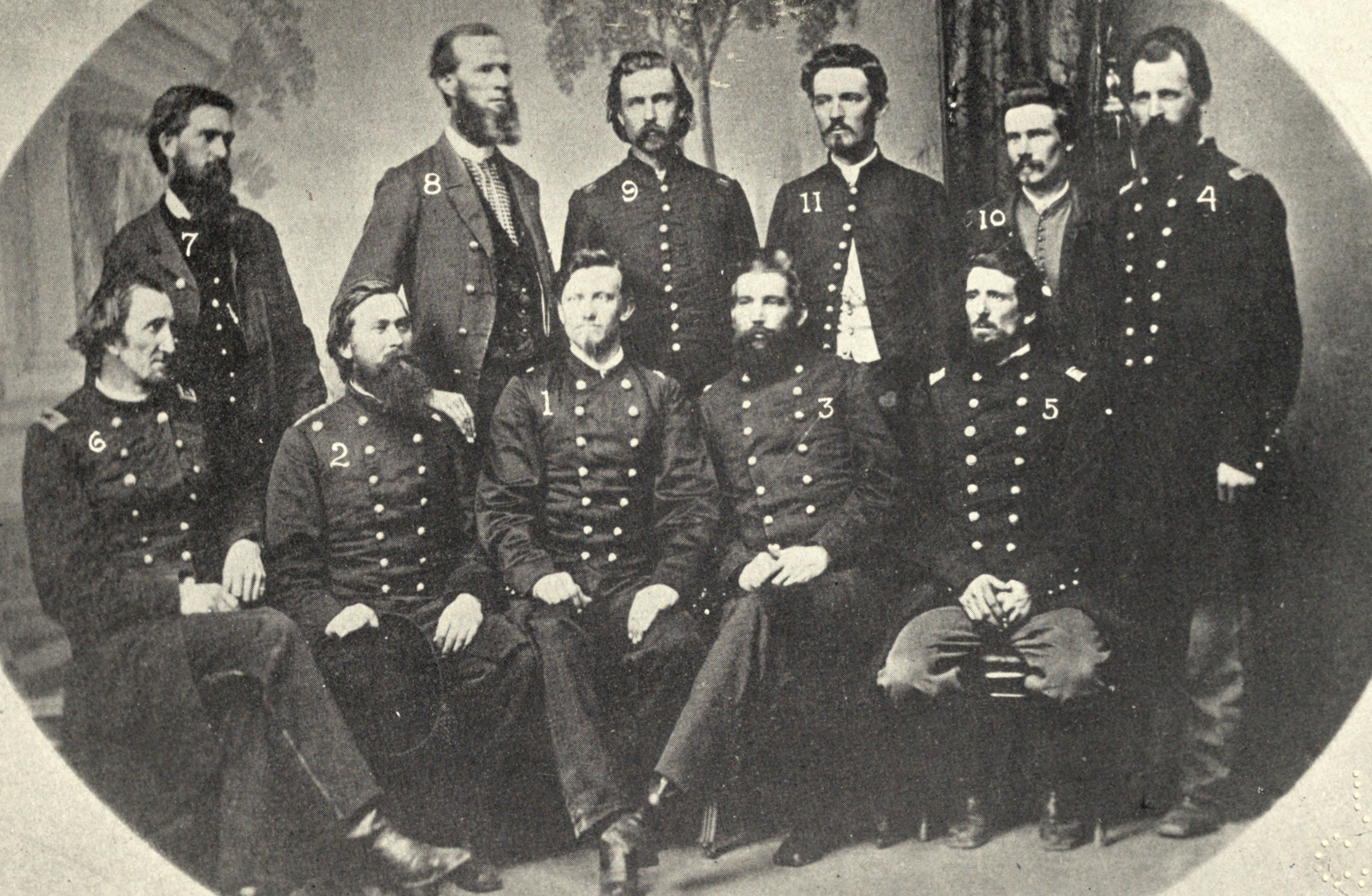
- Field and staff of the 1st Tennessee Cavalry Regiment (Union), photographed late August 1864; Col. Jim Brownlow, seated front and center, was in 70 battles and skirmishes and had four horses killed under him during the course of the war
- Active: November 1862 to June 1865
- Country: United States
- Allegiance: Union
- Branch: Cavalry
- Engagements: Tullahoma Campaign; Battle of Chickamauga; Atlanta campaign Siege of Atlanta; Battle of Lovejoy's Station; Battle of Franklin; Battle of Nashville

The 1st Tennessee Cavalry Regiment was a cavalry regiment that served in the Union Army during the American Civil War. It was also known as 1st East Tennessee Cavalry. The regiment was organized and was nominally commanded by Robert Johnson, the second son of Tennessee politician and Southern Unionist Andrew Johnson, but in truth the regimental commander was James P. Brownlow, the second son of Parson Brownlow.

== Service ==
The 1st Tennessee Cavalry was organized in November 1862 at Camp Dennison, Ohio, by mounting the 4th Tennessee Volunteer Regiment. It was mustered in for a three-year enlistment under the command of Colonel Robert Johnson.

The regiment was attached to:

- Camp Dennison, Ohio, to December 1862
- Reserve Brigade, Cavalry Division, Army of the Cumberland, to January 1863.
- 1st Brigade, 1st Cavalry Division, Army of the Cumberland, to November 1864.
- 1st Brigade, 1st Division, Cavalry Corps, Military Division Mississippi, to January 1865.
- District Middle Tennessee, Department of the Cumberland, to June 1865.

The 1st Tennessee Cavalry mustered out of service at Nashville, Tennessee during April and June 1865.

Circa February 1863, the New York Times reported:

The fine regiment of Col. ROBERT JOHNSON, son of the Military Governor of Tennessee, is daily expected to arrive here. This regiment was changed from infantry to cavalry, and numbers between eleven and twelve hundred men. The order constituting the regiment cavalry instead of infantry was a wise one, and should be followed in regard to several regiments now stationed in Nashville.

== Casualties ==
The regiment lost a total of 356 men during service; 4 officers and 56 enlisted men were killed or mortally wounded, 3 officers and 293 enlisted men died of disease or accident.

== Commanders ==
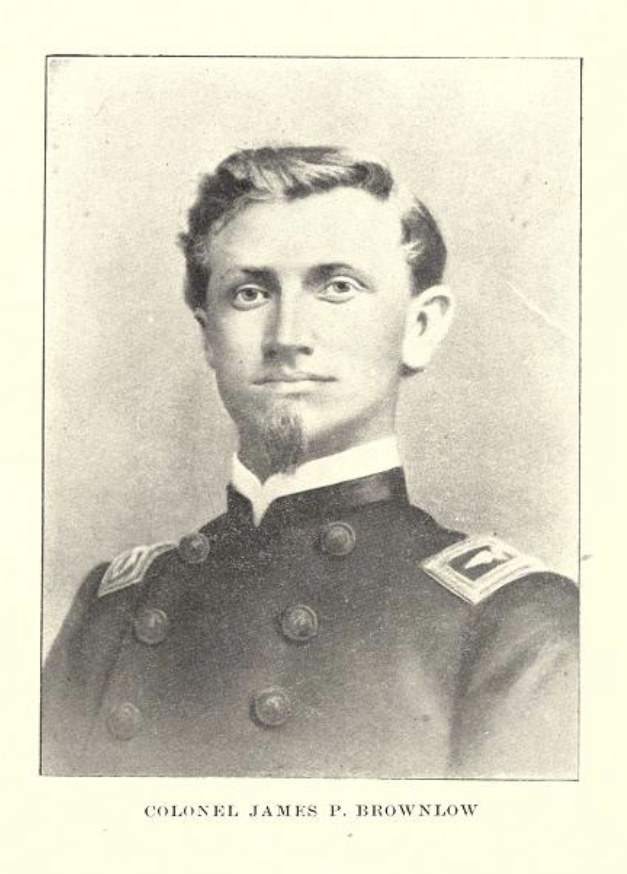
Colonel James P. Brownlow in History of the First regiment of Tennessee volunteer cavalry in the great war of the rebellion, with the armies of the Ohio and Cumberland by William Randolph Carter (1902)

- Colonel Robert Johnson - resigned May 31, 1864, due to "illness" (alcoholism)
- Colonel James P. Brownlow - commanded at the Battle of Chickamauga as lieutenant colonel; he was promoted immediately following Johnson's resignation; per the regimental history, "a promotion he well-deserved, since he was the real commander"
- Lieutenant Colonel Calvin M. Dyer - commanded at the Battle of Nashville; commissioned a lieutenant by Johnson, promoted to major in early 1863 and then to lieutenant colonel upon Johnson's resignation

== Regimental flag ==
On December 6, 1862, the occasion of the organization of the 1st Tennessee as cavalry (rather than infantry), Col. Johnson and Major William B. Tracy presented their soldiers with a "splendid flag" inscribed with the words For Chattanooga, Knoxville and Greeneville, "indicating the determination of the regiment to assist in driving the rebels out of Tennessee, and redeeming the State." The 34-star American flag, also inscribed Johnson's 1st Tennessee Cavalry and "bound round the edge with yellow silk fringe," was produced by Hamlin of Cincinnati, "the prince of military furnishers in the West." The Civil War diary of a soldier named John Coffee Williamson reported this flag, or a successor to it, was captured on September 1, 1864, along with Jim Brownlow breaking both legs. However, the regiment mustered out under that flag and the regimental history includes a photo of a very-warworn regimental flag with little more than the fringed border surviving, and reports that Col. Brownlow's mother had it in her possession and donated it to the fraternal organization of veterans of the regiment.

Major Tracy, who came from Chattanooga, was deemed, by Parson Brownlow, to be a schemer who was "keeping up...bad feelings." Tracy later resigned, dated June 22, 1863, after a practical joke went sideways and he garnered the enmity of the men.

== See also ==
- List of Tennessee Civil War units
- Tennessee in the Civil War

== Sources ==
- Carter, William Randolph (1902). History of the First regiment of Tennessee volunteer cavalry in the great war of the rebellion, with the armies of the Ohio and Cumberland, under Generals Marogan, Rosecrans, Thomas, Stanley and Wilson. University of California Libraries. Knoxville, Tenn., Gaut-Ogden co., printers.
- Dyer, Frederick H. A Compendium of the War of the Rebellion (Des Moines, IA: Dyer Pub. Co.), 1908.
- Wiefering, Edna. Tennessee Union Soldiers Vol. 1 (Cleveland, TN: Cleveland Public Library), 1996.

Attribution
