= 10th Tennessee Infantry Regiment =

- Active: April 18, 1862, to June 23, 1865
- Country: United States
- Allegiance: Union
- Branch: Union Army
- Type: Infantry
- Engagements: American Civil War

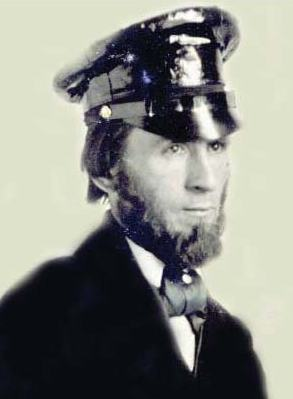
Charles Johnson, a son of President Andrew Johnson who enlisted as assistant surgeon in the 10th Tennessee Volunteer Infantry in the Fall of 1862

The 10th Tennessee Infantry Regiment was an infantry regiment that served in the Union Army during the American Civil War. Originally recruited and designated as the 1st Middle Tennessee Infantry, it was largely composed of Irish-Americans.

== Service ==
The 10th Tennessee Infantry was organized at Nashville, Tennessee, from May until August 1862, and mustered in for a three-year enlistment under the command of Colonel Alvan Cullem Gillem.

Attachments

- Post and District of Nashville, Tennessee, Department of the Cumberland, to June 1863.
- 3rd Brigade, 2nd Division, Reserve Corps, Department of the Cumberland (until September 1863)
- Defenses of Nashville & Northwestern Railroad (until January 1864)
- 1st Brigade, Defenses of Nashville, Tennessee (January 1864)
- 1st Brigade, 3rd Division, XII Corps, Department of the Cumberland (until April 1864)
- 1st Brigade, 4th Division, XX Corps, Department of the Cumberland ( until April 1865)
- 1st Brigade, 4th Division, District of East Tennessee (until June 1865)
- The 10th Tennessee Infantry mustered out of service at Nashville, Tennessee, between April 2 and May 17, 1865.

== Detailed service ==
- Post and garrison duty at Nashville, Tennessee, until September 1863.
- Ordered to Bridgeport, Alabama, September 24, 1863.
- Guard duty on Nashville & Northwestern Railroad, and garrison and guard duty at Nashville, Tennessee, until April 1865.
- Ordered to Greenville April 24, 1865, and duty in District of East Tennessee until June.

== Commanders ==
- Colonel Alvan Cullem Gillem

== See also ==
- List of Tennessee Union Civil War units
- Tennessee in the Civil War
