= Andrew Johnson National Historic Site =

National Historic Site in the United States

- U.S. National Register of Historic Places
- U.S. National Historic Site
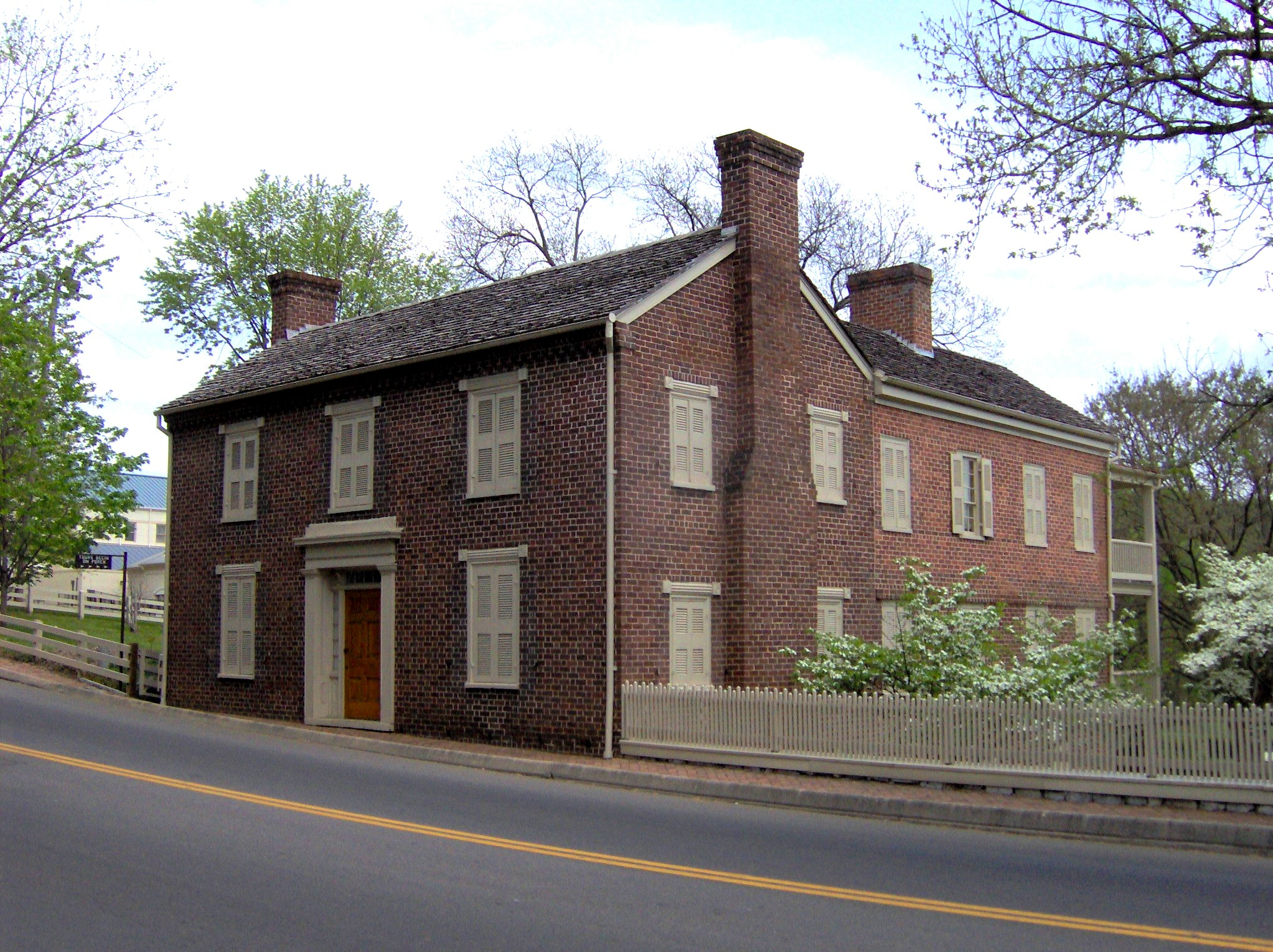
- One of Andrew Johnson's homes

- Location within Tennessee Location within the United States
- Location: Greeneville, Tennessee
- Coordinates: 36°9′30″N 82°50′6″W
- Area: 16.68 acres (0.0675 km^{2})
- Built: 1830
- Architect: War Department
- Architectural style: Colonial Revival
- Visitation: 43,203 (2025)
- Website: Andrew Johnson National Historic Site
- NRHP reference No.: 66000073
- Added to NRHP: October 15, 1966

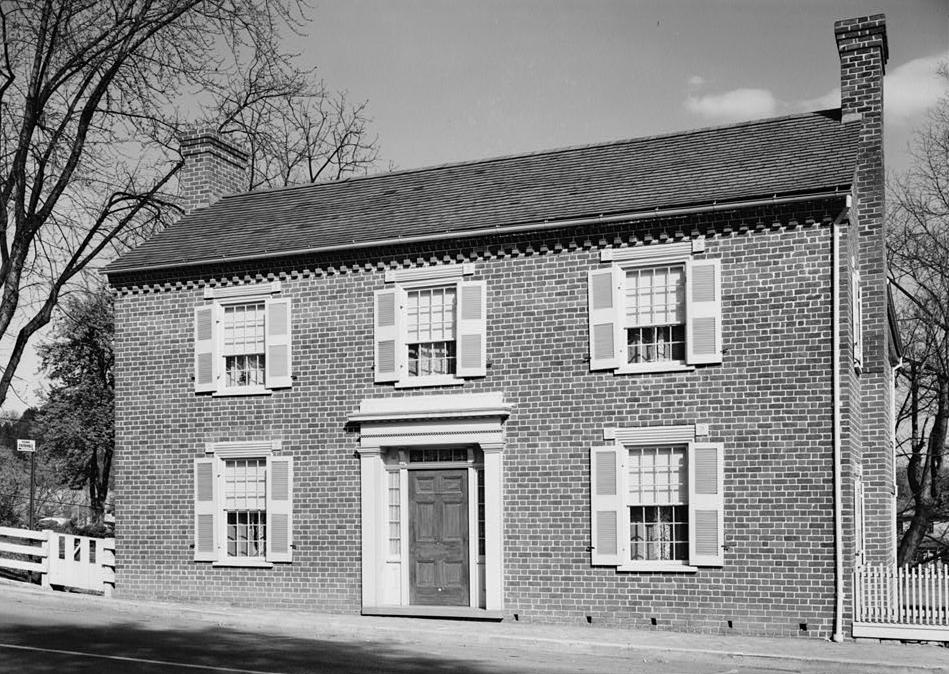
One of Andrew Johnson's homes in Greeneville, Tennessee

Andrew Johnson National Historic Site is a National Historic Site in Greeneville, Tennessee, maintained by the National Park Service. It was established to honor Andrew Johnson, the 17th president of the United States, who became president after Abraham Lincoln was assassinated. The site includes two of Johnson's homes, his tailor shop, and his grave site within the Andrew Johnson National Cemetery.

The cemetery also includes the interments of Johnson's wife, Eliza McCardle Johnson, and son Colonel Robert Johnson. David T. Patterson, a United States Senator from Tennessee, and his son Andrew J. Patterson, who was instrumental in securing historic designation for the Greeneville properties associated with Andrew Johnson, were among others buried in the cemetery. The site was authorized by Congress as a U.S. National Monument in 1935, established on April 27, 1942, and redesignated a National Historic Site on December 11, 1963.

== Today ==
Today, the site totals 16 acres in area, and has three separate units. These units are the Andrew Johnson Visitor Complex, the Andrew Johnson Homestead, and the Andrew Johnson National Cemetery. Visitors receive a copy of the admission ticket to Johnson's impeachment hearings; every year on May 26, visitors vote on whether or not Johnson should have been removed from office.

The Andrew Johnson Visitor Complex consists of the visitor center, the museum, and Andrew Johnson's tailor shop. The visitor center shows a 13.5 minute film about Johnson and his time in Greeneville. The one-story/one room tailor shop remains much as it was in Andrew Johnson's day. It is surrounded by a memorial building built by the state of Tennessee in 1923 to prevent wear and tear upon the tailor shop. For kids, they can become Junior Rangers by completing a small activity book.

Andrew Johnson's first Greeneville home is located across the Street from the visitor complex.

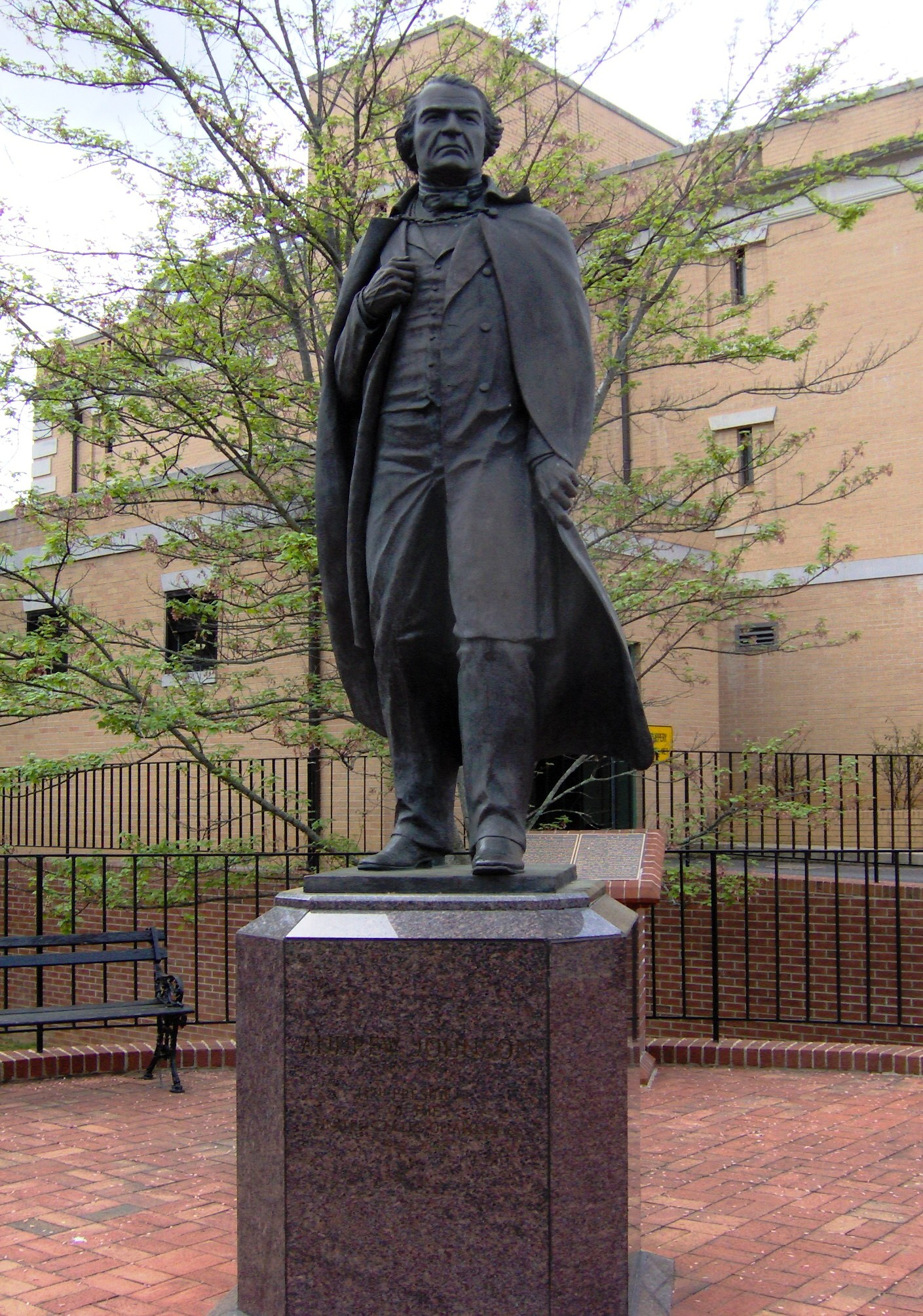
Statue of United States President Andrew Johnson at the Andrew Johnson National Historic Site

The Andrew Johnson Homestead is maintained to look as it did when Andrew Johnson and his wife lived in the domicile from 1869 to 1875. Johnson had purchased the home in 1851. During the war years, the house was occupied by soldiers. It required renovations when the family returned to the house after Johnson's leaving the presidency in 1869. It is a Greek Revival two-story brick house.

The Andrew Johnson National Cemetery was established in 1906. Andrew Johnson owned 23 acres outside Greeneville on Signal Hill. Upon his death in 1875, Johnson was buried on the property. On June 5, 1878, the city erected a 28-foot (8.5 m)-tall marble statue in his honor by Johnson's grave. The monument was considered so dominant that the hill's name was changed to "Monument Hill". Johnson's daughter Martha Johnson Patterson, who inherited the property, willed on September 2, 1898, that the land become a park. She further pushed in 1900 to make the site a national cemetery, so that instead of the Johnson family's maintaining it, the federal government would. The United States Congress chose to make the site a National Cemetery in 1906, and by 1908 the United States War Department took control of it. On May 23, 1942, control of the cemetery was shifted to the National Park Service.

== See also ==
- List of residences of presidents of the United States
- Presidential memorials in the United States
- Greeneville Historic District (Greeneville, Tennessee)
