= Frank Johnson =

Frank Johnson may refer to:

== Entertainment ==
- Francis Johnson (composer) (1792–1844), known as Frank, American musician and composer
- Frank Johnson (musician) (c. 1790–1871), American musician
- Frank Tenney Johnson (1874–1939), painter of the American west
- Frankie Darro (1917–1976), American actor born Frank Johnson Jr.
- Frank E. Johnson, American cinematographer, producer and film director
- Frank Johnson Publications, an Australian comic book publisher

== Politics ==
- Frank Johnson (politician) (1848–1904), journalist and politician in colonial South Australia
- Frank Johnson (mayor) (1855–1921), mayor of Adelaide, 1907–1909
- Frank H. Johnson (1867–?), American politician
- Frank B. Johnson (politician) (1894–1949), American politician in Minnesota

== Sports ==
- Frank Johnson (American football) (died 1890), American football coach
- Frank Johnson (basketball, born 1911) (1911–1994), American college football and college basketball player and coach
- Frank Johnson (1930s outfielder), American baseball player
- Frank Johnson (footballer, born 1916) (1916–1979), Australian rules footballer for Geelong
- Frank Johnson (rugby league) (1922–1993), Australian rugby league player, coach and administrator
- Frank Johnson (boxer) (1928–1970), English boxer of the 1940s and 1950s
- Frank Johnson (footballer, born 1932) (1932–2016), Australian rules player and member of the Australian Football Hall of Fame
- Frank Johnson (footballer, born 1936), Australian rules footballer for South Fremantle, Footscray and Fitzroy
- Frank Johnson (1960s outfielder) (1942–2025), American baseball player
- Frank Johnson (basketball, born 1958), American basketball player and coach
- Franky Johnson (born 1993), Filipino-American basketball player

== Other ==
- Frank W. Johnson (1799–1884), a commander of the Texan Army during the Texas Revolution
- Frank Johnson Goodnow (1859–1939), American educator and legal scholar
- Frank Johnson (RAF airman) (1896–1961), British World War I ace
- Frank Minis Johnson (1918–1999), United States Federal judge
- Frank Johnson (journalist) (1943–2006), British editor of The Spectator
- Frank B. Johnson (pathologist) (1919–2005), African American chemical pathologist
- Andrew Johnson Jr. (1852–1879), son of U.S. president, called Frank Johnson

== See also ==
- Franklin Johnson (disambiguation)
- Francis Johnson (disambiguation)
- Frank Johnston (disambiguation)
