= Francis Johnson =

Francis Johnson may refer to:

== Politics ==
- Francis Johnson (MP) (died 1605), English MP for Aldeburgh 1597
- Francis Johnson (congressman) (1776–1842), U.S. representative from Kentucky
- Francis Godschall Johnson (1817–1894), Canadian politician
- Francis Bulkeley Johnson (1828–1887), member of the Legislative Council of Hong Kong
- Francis Johnson (ILP politician) (1878–1970), British socialist activist with the Independent Labour Party
- Francis M. Johnson (1850–1924), Mississippi politician

== Sports ==
- Francis Johnson (cricketer) (1880–1951), Australian cricketer
- Francis Johnson (basketball) (1910–1997), American basketball player and Olympic gold medalist

== Other ==
- Francis Johnson (academic) (fl. 1660), Oxford academic and administrator
- Francis Johnson (architect) (1911–1995), English architect
- Francis Johnson (Brownist) (1562–1618), English Presbyterian separatist minister
- Francis Johnson (composer) (1792–1844), American musician and composer
- Francis Johnson (linguist) (died 1876), linguist who taught at the East India Company College, 1824–1855
- Frank W. Johnson (Francis White Johnson, 1799–1884), co-commander of the Texian Army during the Texas Revolution

== See also ==
- Thomas Francis Johnson (1909–1988), U.S. representative from Maryland
- Frances Johnson (disambiguation)
- Francis Johnston (disambiguation)
- Frank Johnson (disambiguation)
- Frank Johnston (disambiguation)
