= Mary Johnson Stover =

American political hostess (1832–1883)

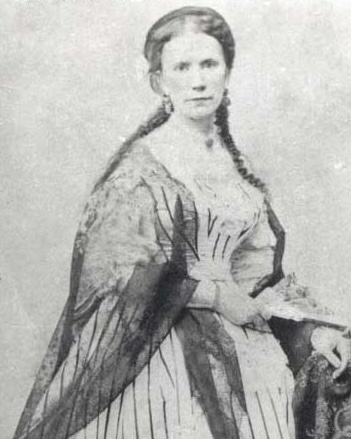
- Born: Mary Johnson; May 8, 1832; Greeneville, Tennessee, U.S.
- Died: April 19, 1883 (aged 50)
- Resting place: Andrew Johnson National Cemetery
- Spouse(s): Daniel Stover, William R. Brown
- Children: Eliza Johnson Stover, Sarah Drake Stover, Andrew Johnson Stover
- Parents: Andrew Johnson (father); Eliza McCardle Johnson (mother)

Mary Johnson Stover (née Johnson; May 8, 1832 – April 19, 1883) was a daughter of 17th U.S. President Andrew Johnson and his wife Eliza McCardle. Stover and her three children lived at the White House during the Johnson administration, as Stover's husband, a soldier in the Union Army, had died during the American Civil War and their East Tennessee homestead had been pillaged by Confederates. Stover assisted her older sister Martha Patterson as an acting First Lady of the United States.

== Biography ==
=== Early life and first marriage ===
Mary Johnson was born May 8, 1832, in the family home on Water Street, Greeneville, Tennessee, the third-born of the five children of Andrew and Eliza (McCardle) Johnson. Andrew Johnson, who had grown up quite poor and had received a minimal education, made a point to send his children to good schools. Mary attended Rogersville Female Institute (originally Odd Fellows Female Institute) in Rogersville, Hawkins County, Tennessee.

In 1852, while her father was serving what would be his last of five terms as the Representative of Tennessee's 1st congressional district, Mary Johnson married Daniel Stover, a farmer from Carter County, Tennessee. According to the 1928 biography of Andrew Johnson by Winston, Stover was "a typical blue-eyed mountaineer, soon to become Colonel of the Fourth Tennessee Union Infantry. He was a man of high courage...Dan, a nephew of Mordecai Lincoln, (Note: Stover's maternal grandmother Phoebe Ward Stover was in-laws with the Lincoln family through her sister Mary Ward's marriage to Isaac Lincoln. Isaac Lincoln's brother Abraham Lincoln was father of Mordecai Lincoln (and paternal grandfather of President Abraham Lincoln). In some tellings this made Stover a nephew of Mordecai Lincoln.) was the person of all others Andrew Johnson would have selected as a son-in-law." Stover had a "fine plantation" in the Watauga Valley. In 1860, on the cusp of the Civil War, the family was living together in Carter County. Daniel Stover owned a farm worth US$18,000 (equivalent to $645,000 in 2025) and a personal estate worth US$12,000 (equivalent to $430,000 in 2025). Their daughter Eliza Johnson Stover, age five, was attending school. Sarah Drake Stover was three years old, and the baby, Andrew Johnson Stover, was two months old.

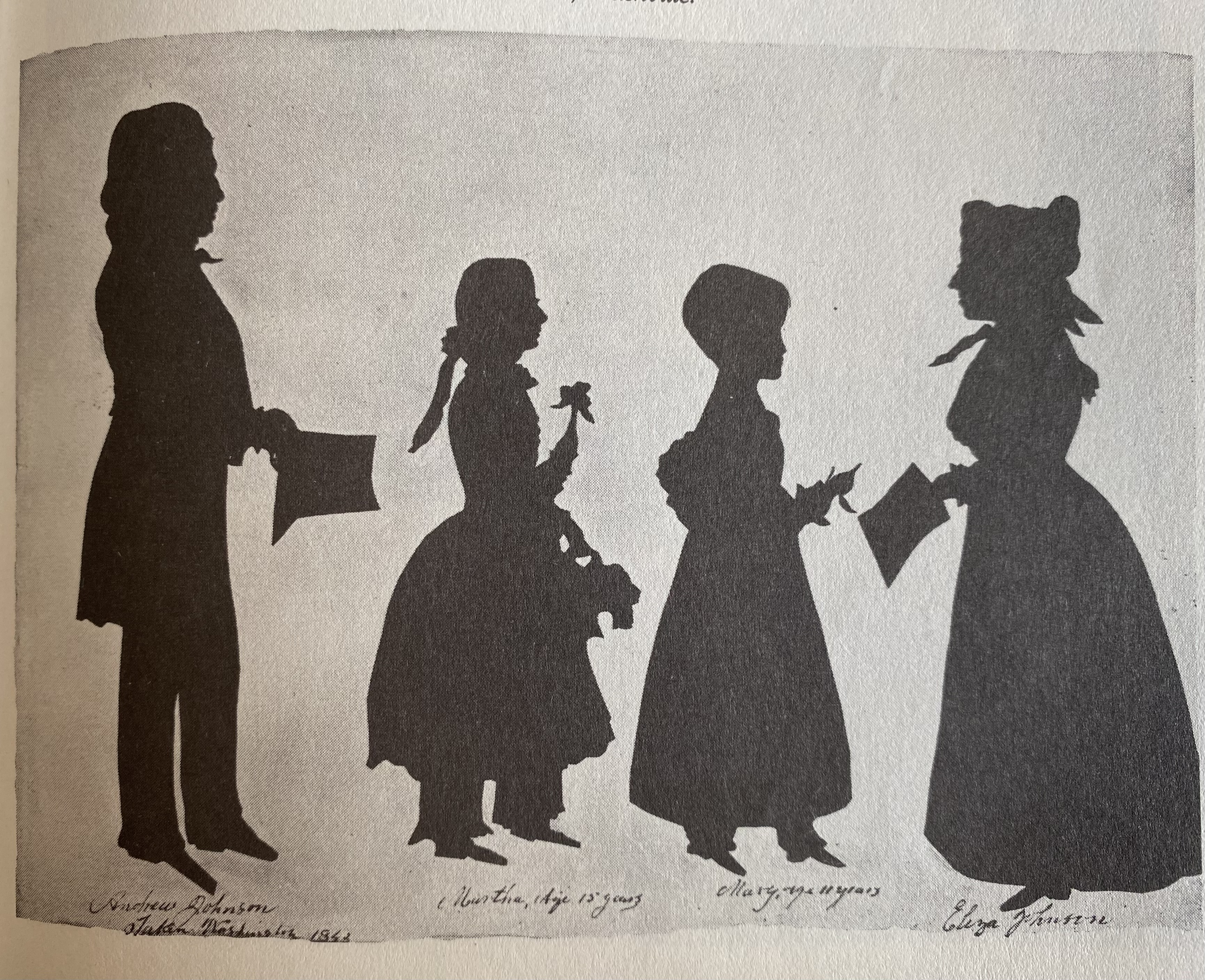
1853 silhouette of Andrew, Martha, Mary and Eliza Johnson (Tennessee State Museum)

In June 1861, Daniel Stover was a delegate from Carter County to the pro-Union East Tennessee Convention. During the first autumn of the American Civil War, Stover participated in a guerrilla warfare action called the East Tennessee bridge burnings. He was one of four men who knew of the plan prior to the last 24 hours before the attacks were to be executed. The November 8, 1861 bridge burning was carried out with the approval of Union leaders, including Abraham Lincoln and Andrew Johnson, and was supposed to clear the way for the occupation of East Tennessee by federal forces. Nine bridges were targeted, five were destroyed; Stover led the raid that successfully destroyed Holston River Bridge at Union Depot, also called Zollicoffer, now called Bluff City, Tennessee. However, the United States Army did not come marching in to East Tennessee, and Confederate Secretary of War Judah Benjamin ordered that any captured bridge burners be put to death. To live and fight another day, the bridge burners retreated into the hills. Stover and his allies lived for months in the Pond Mountains in eastern Carter County.

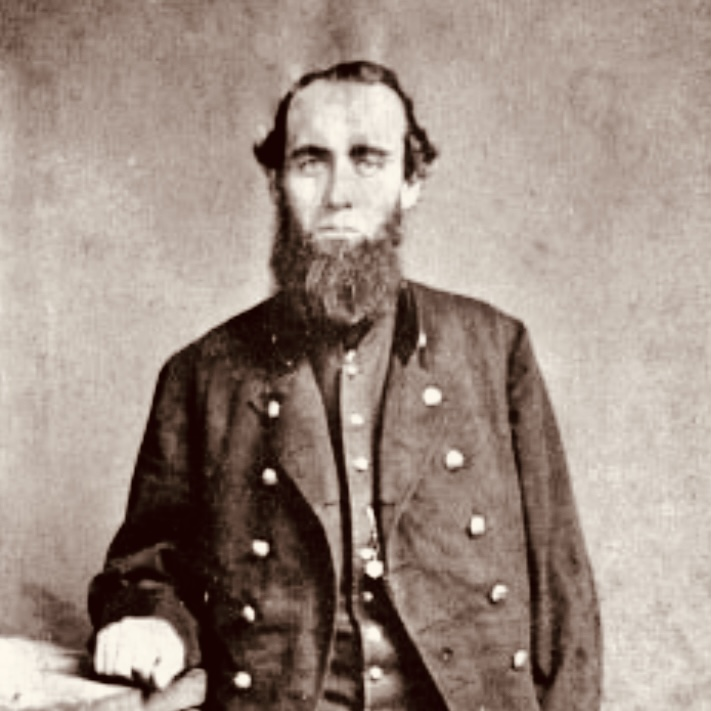
Col. Daniel Stover II (1826–1864), farmer, slave owner, East Tennessee bridge burner, and "Lincolnite"

Amidst the ongoing conflict, Daniel Stover remained in hiding in the wilderness through the cold and wet winter of 1861–62, while Eliza McCardle Johnson and her youngest son Frank lived with Mary and her children in Carter County. Mary Stover and her mother Eliza Johnson prepared daily baskets of provisions, baking countless loaves of bread and turning the farm's hogs and beeves into hams and ribs, for the men in the hills and their distressed families elsewhere in the county. Per Holloway's 1871 Ladies of the White House, "Most of the men who were with Mr. Stover were poor, and their families, left to the mercy of their enemies, would have starved, had it not been for the care and generosity of Mrs. Stover." Stover was eventually permitted to come home "on parole" due to intercessions on his behalf by Confederate-aligned friends. In October 1862 the Stovers, Eliza and Frank Johnson were driven out of their Carter County home and sent to Murfreesboro. After they left, the residence and farm buildings were pillaged. The Stovers, accompanied by Eliza, moved around a bit in early 1863, staying for a time in Indiana and in Louisville, Kentucky. The family travelled together to Nashville arriving May 30, 1863, where Col. and Mrs. Stover, Eliza and Andrew Johnson were welcomed by a large crowd. However, due to chronic health problems from his time in the wilderness, Stover "did not see much active service in the field," and resigned from the United States Army on August 10, 1864, due to illness. He died at Nashville just before Christmas of that year.

=== White House years ===
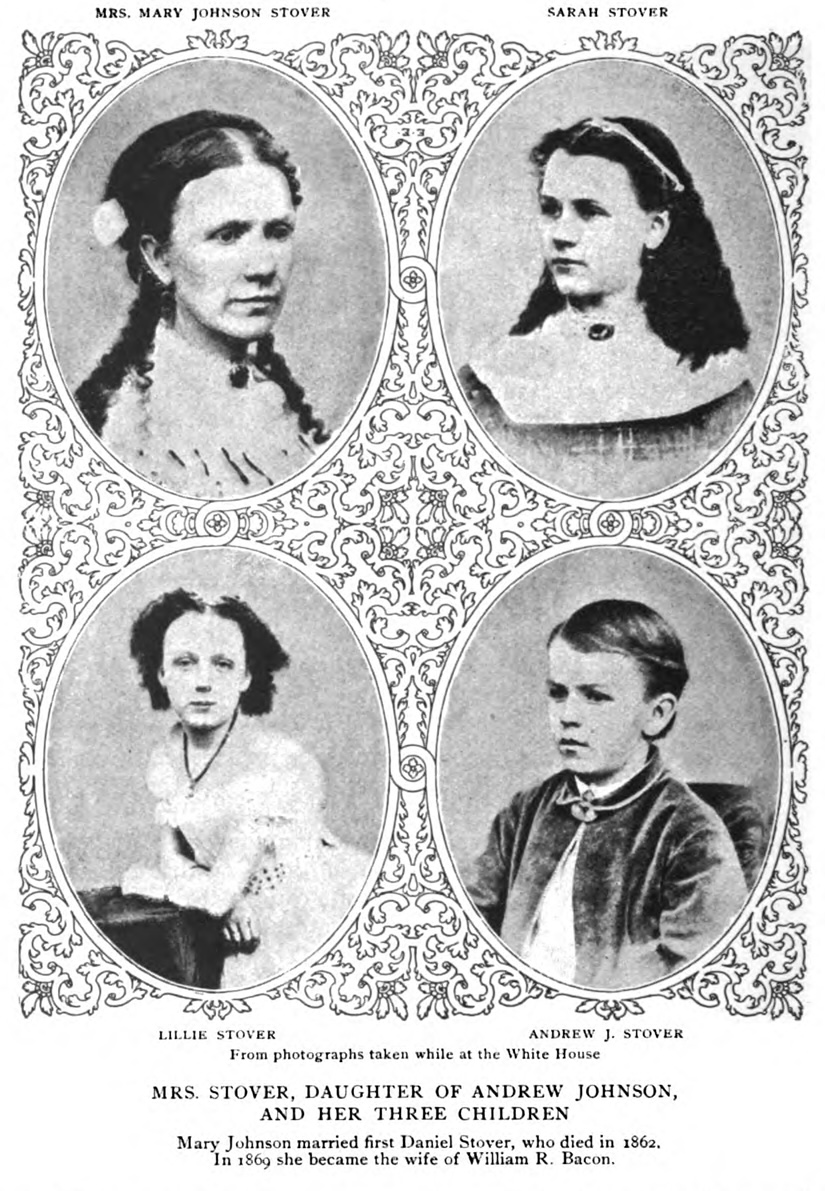
Stover and her children during their time in the White House (Century Magazine, 1908)

While her older sister Martha Johnson Patterson, is generally, and rightly, named as the de facto First Lady of the Johnson administration, Mary Stover was also present at the White House for much (but not all) of her father's presidency, and assisted her sister in managing the household and hosting events. For example, shortly after his impeachment, Andrew Johnson hosted a dinner party for 40 guests. Eliza McCardle remained in her room, as was her habit, "but Martha and Mary efficiently took her place as hostesses." One reference says that Mary mainly cared for Eliza while Martha typically handled the work of greeting guests. Martha and Mary together brought five young children to live at the Executive Mansion, and recollections of their energy and strong relationship with "grandpa" (President Johnson) are prominent in various recollections of life at the White House. Among other things, an 1868 birthday party for Andrew Johnson, which was organized by the grandchildren, was one of only two times that Eliza McCardle ever appeared at a public event during her husband's presidency. (Note: Mrs. Johnson also emerged from seclusion for an event for Queen Emma of Hawaii in 1866.)

The only decoration of the East Room was the erection of a platform for the musicians, which was covered with pink tarleton and festooned with evergreens. At each corner stood a flower-stand containing beautiful bouquets. The musicians were from the marine band. At seven o'clock Professor Marini, dancing master, marshalled the children in the long hall and arranged them in couples, after which, the grand promenade commenced, led by a son of General Eastman (Note: "General Eastman" is possibly Seth Eastman?) and Miss Lily Stover. The promenade was succeeded in regular order by the following programme: Second, quadrille, Faust; third, polka, Von Bilse; fourth, schottische, Weverein; fifth, Lanciers, Weingarten; sixth, gallop, John Strauss; Intermission. ¶ During the intermission, the juveniles were ushered into the spacious State Dining Room, where a magnificent table, loaded down with cakes, fruits, confectionery, and flowers, and splendidly decorated under the able management of Steward [James L.] Thomas, awaited them. The happy party at once proceeded to do full justice to the good things provided, and for an hour that room contained the merriest throng ever assembled around that festive board. Among the number present were the children of the President's family, Frank Johnson, Andrew Patterson, Andrew Stover, Lily Stover, and Belle Patterson, the latter being also generally regarded as the belle of the party.

— The Ladies of the White House (1871)

The Stovers spent summers in Tennessee but came back to the White House each fall. Mary Stover also left the White House in the capable hands of her sister toward the end of her father's term, leaving early to return to Tennessee and set up a household for herself, her children and her ailing mother.

=== Second marriage and later life ===
In 1869, just after the end of her father's presidency, Mary Johnson Stover remarried, to William Ramsay Brown (1819–1902), a merchant of Greeneville, Tennessee. (Notably, Brown's late first wife, Mary Sophia Lincoln, had been a cousin of Abraham Lincoln through her father Mordecai Lincoln.) (Note: In 1827, as justice of the peace, Mordecai Lincoln officiated the wedding of Andrew Johnson and Eliza McCardle.) The wedding was a private evening ceremony, attended only by family, on April 20, 1869. Two days later, Mary Johnson Stover Brown's younger brother Robert Johnson, who had long struggled with alcoholism, killed himself with an overdose of alcohol and laudanum. Circa 1870, a newspaper reporter described Brown as "a plain and elderly-looking gentleman, well-to-do in the world, from dry goods and groceries."

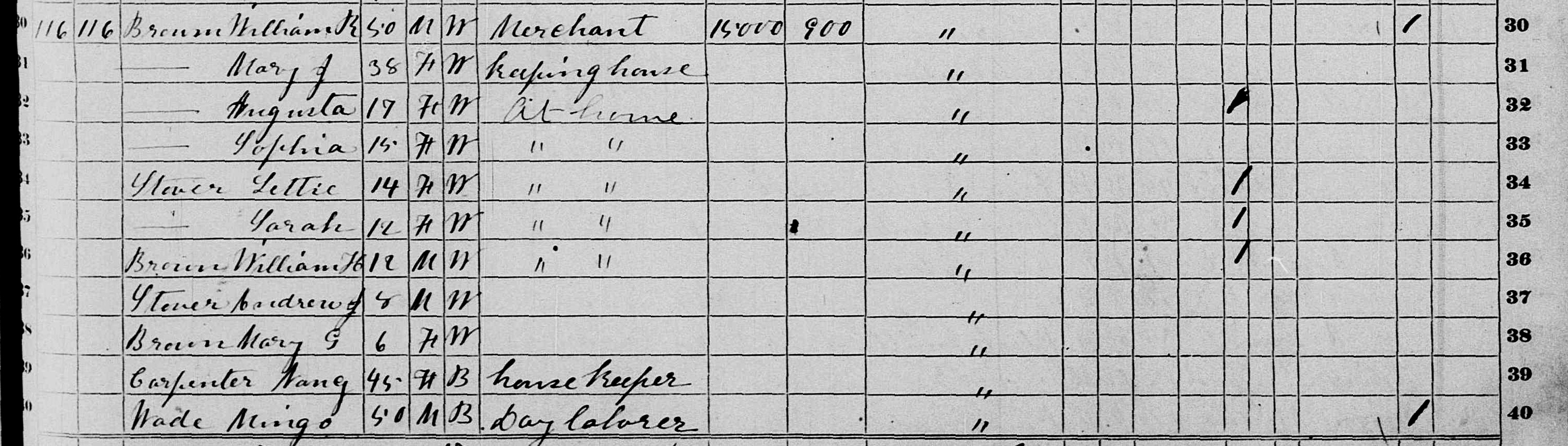
Brown and Stover children in the "blended family" household of William R. and Mary J. Brown in Greeneville, 1870

The Browns had a home across the street from the Johnsons in Greeneville. However, the marriage was unhappy. After a short period of time, the couple were "more or less estranged" and lived separately (Mary spending most of her time at the Stover farm in Carter County). Former President and recently elected U.S. Senator Andrew Johnson died while visiting Mary's home near Elizabethton, Tennessee in 1875, although Mary did not attend the funeral because she was caring for her mother. Eliza died about six months later, in early 1876; Mary waited until both her parents had died to file for divorce in February 1876. There were "rumors that Brown was abusive or mismanaged Stover's children's inheritance" although the divorce records only weakly support the latter claim; nonetheless, the judge granted the divorce within five days of filing. Mary used the surname Stover for the remainder of her life.

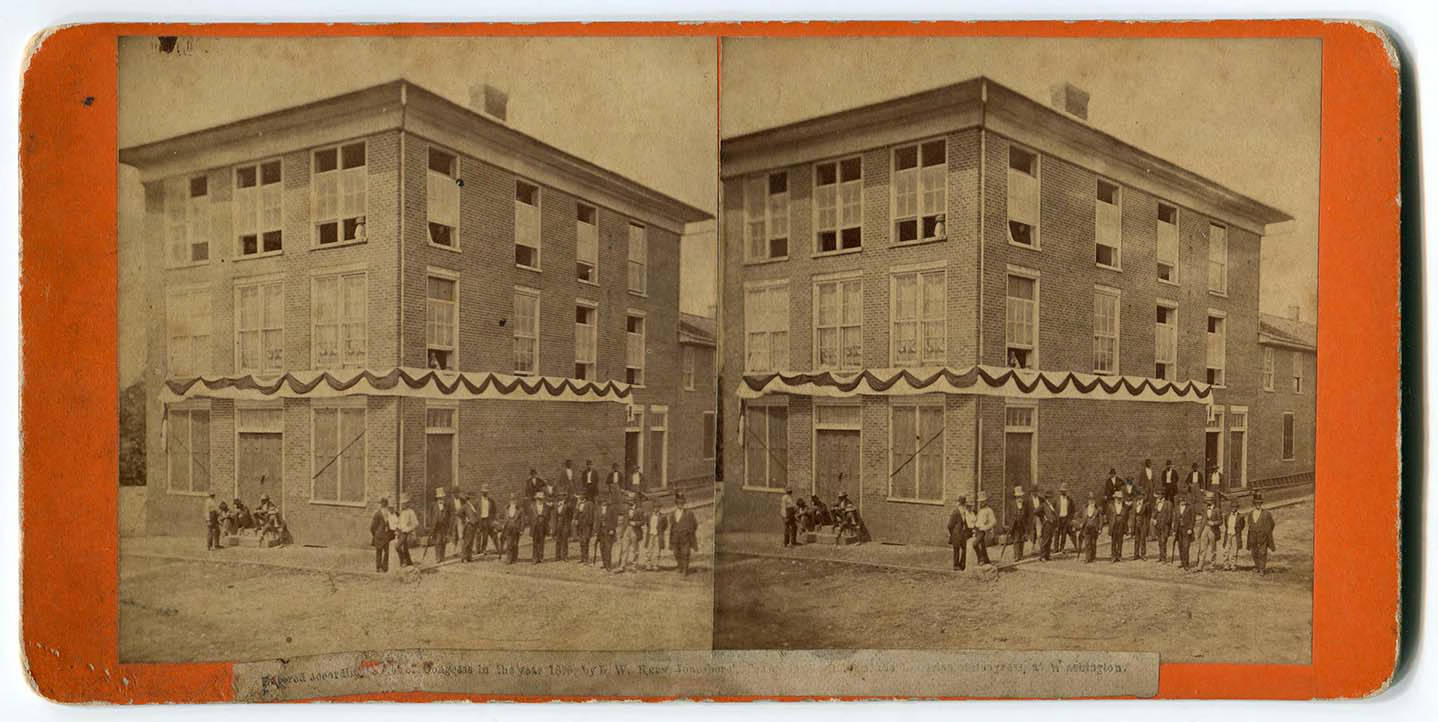
"Governor Porter, ex-Senators Patterson, Fowler, Dr. W. R. Sevier and other prominent men" photographed in front of Brown's Corner, also known as Johnson's Block, on Main Street in Greeneville on the occasion of ex-president Johnson's funeral; Brown's Corner may have been the location of William R. Brown's business

In 1880, Mary was living with 23-year-old Sarah Stover and two household servants in Union, Tennessee (Sullivan County). As a single mother, Stover prospered financially, acquiring land in Tennessee and Texas, and profiting from her inherited share of the Holston Cotton Mills in Bluff City. She built a spacious brick home nearby, called Stover House. Mary's step-daughter-in-law Lula May visited Stover Hall as a child and described Mary as "the handsomest woman I ever saw—tall, with reddish brown hair." Stover died in 1883 at age 50, of tuberculosis, leaving most of her estate to her two daughters. She is buried near her parents and children at Andrew Johnson National Cemetery in Tennessee. Stover House in Bluff City burned in 1906 but many artefacts of the Johnson family were saved from destruction. A new home, called Long Shadows, was built on the foundations. William R. Brown outlived his ex-wife by almost two decades and was an "honorary pallbearer" at her sister Martha Patterson's funeral in 1901.

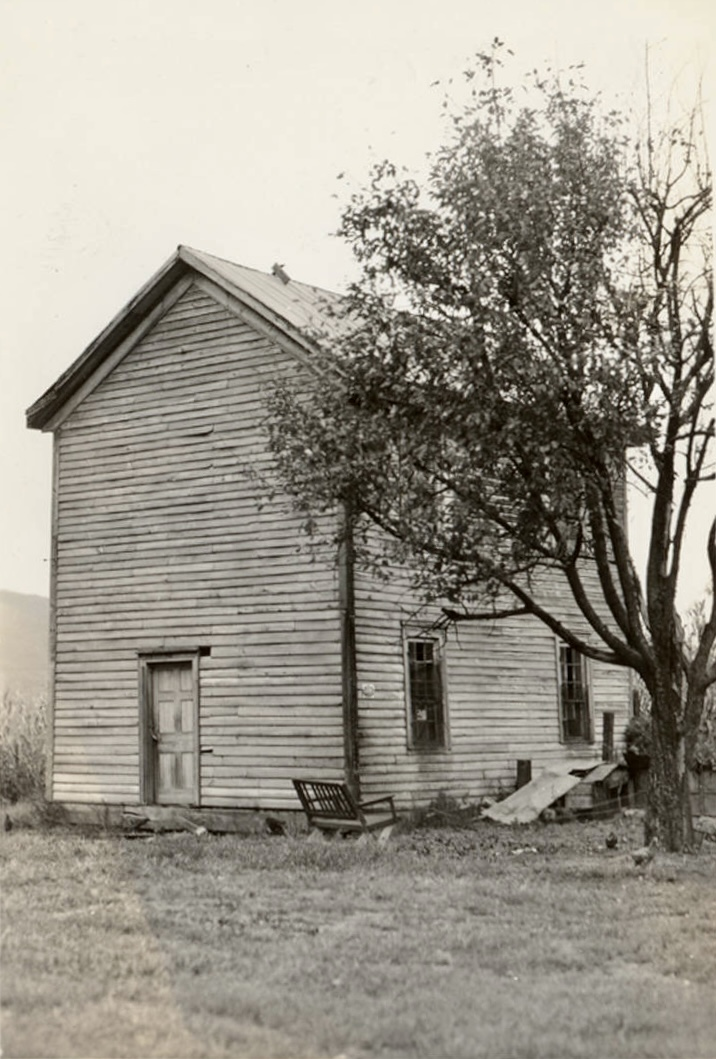
Abandoned Stover farmhouse, photographed c. 1935 and described in the 1939 American Guide to Tennessee: "At 3.3 m. on State 91, at the northern end of the bridge is the junction with a graveled road that runs along the river. Left on this road to another graveled road leading 0.9 m. to the DANIEL STOVER HOUSE (R). This two-story frame house, now abandoned, stands in the yard of another two-story frame house." (Lincoln Memorial University Libraries via Digital Library of Appalachia)

== Descendants ==
† indicates individual is buried in family burial plot at Andrew Johnson National Cemetery

- Eliza Johnson "Lillie" Stover† (May 11, 1855 – November 5, 1892) m. October 14, 1875 to Thomas F. Maloney (December 6, 1846 – March 15, 1907) - no issue
- Sarah Drake Stover† (June 27, 1857 – March 22, 1886) m. June 7, 1881 to William Bruce Bachman (November 25, 1852 – September 9, 1922)
  - Andrew Johnson Bachman† (June 13, 1882 – January 26, 1955) m. September 28, 1920 to Ethel Crockett Irwin† - marriage had no issue
  - Samuel Bernard Bachman (May 13, 1884 – April 13, 1914) - unmarried, no issue
- Andrew Johnson Stover† (March 6, 1860 – January 25, 1923) - unmarried, no issue

=== Lillie Stover Maloney ===
Lillie's husband Thomas Maloney had been at one time a private secretary to Andrew Johnson. Around 1874–75 Maloney was a co-editor of the Greeneville Intelligencer with Lillie's paternal uncle Frank Johnson (who was only three years older than her). Lillie and Thomas eventually divorced; the marriage had produced no children. At the time of Lillie's death she was described as Miss Stover. After Sarah died, Lillie was involved in raising for her two sons, who "came to love her as a mother." Lillie Stover died in November 1892 at age 37, from consumption, which has been "so fatal in the Johnson family" at the East Tennessee Tuberculosis Sanatorium, where she had been hospitalized since January.

=== Sarah Stover Bachman ===
Sarah had two children with husband William B. Bachman, who was a Tennessee state legislator and delegate to presidential nominating conventions. After Sarah died, her widower husband married second, Lula May Peterson. William and Lula had four children of their own; they and their descendants preserved Johnson family relics and stories at Long Shadows well into the 1960s.

=== Andrew Johnson Stover ===
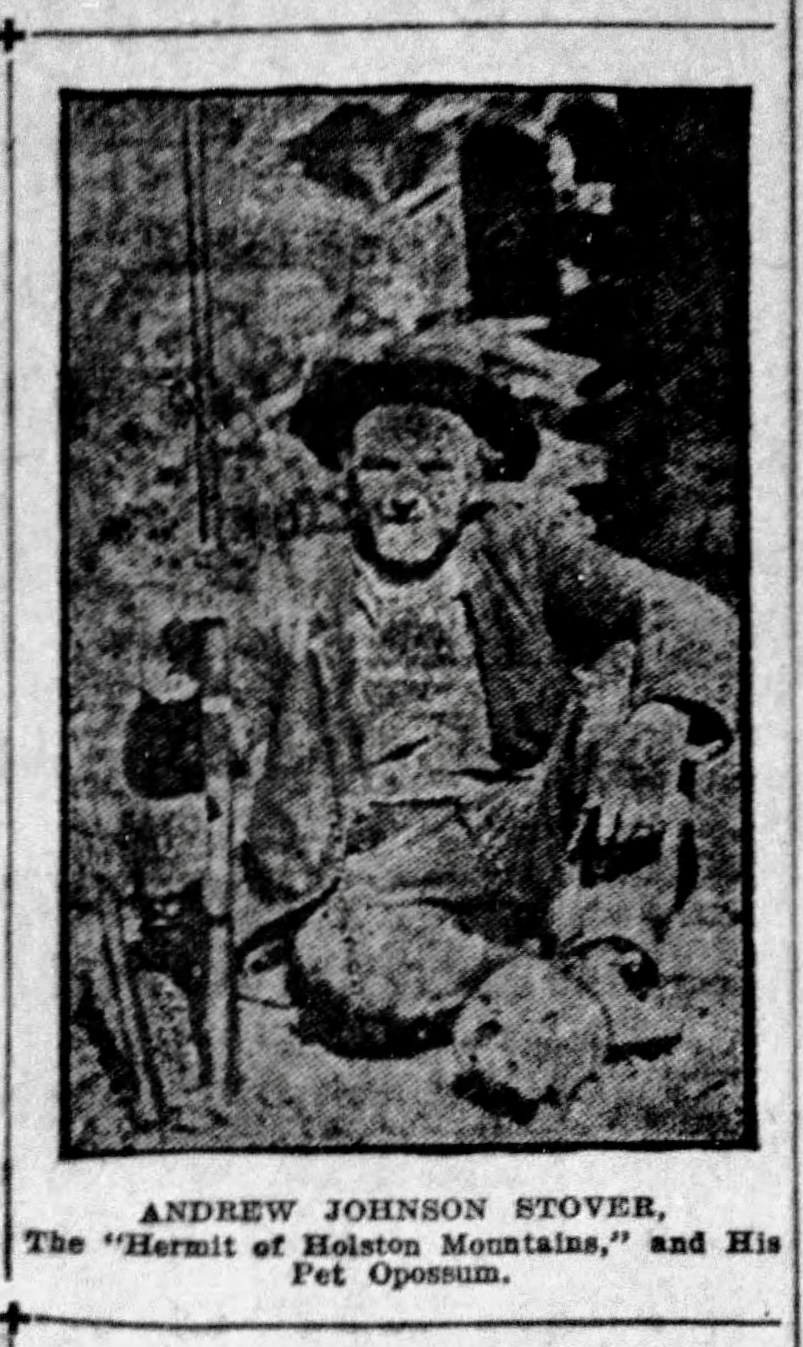
"Andrew Johnson Stover, the Hermit of Holston Mountains, and His Pet Opossum" (Boston Globe, 1914)

Stover's son, Andrew Johnson Stover, was known as the "baby of the White House" during his grandfather's presidency. At age 13 he suffered a concussive head injury that apparently left him in a state of arrested mental development. He became an avid outdoorsman, spent time learning skills from Native Americans at a property his mother owned in Texas, and ultimately became a mountain hermit. He was legally under the guardianship of lawyers in Greeneville but lived independently alone in a hut for decades, only coming down from the mountain (against his better judgment) when his guardians insisted that it was going to snow. His mountain redoubt was not far from where his father had lived in hiding during the winter of 1861–62. Andrew Johnson Stover died at age 63 after a brief bout with pneumonia.

== See also ==
- Dolly Johnson
- Bibliography of Andrew Johnson
- List of children of presidents of the United States
