= Francis Johnston =

Francis Johnston may refer to:

- Francis Johnston (architect) (1760–1829), Irish architect
- Francis Earl Johnston (1871–1917), New Zealand army officer
- Francis Johnston (bishop) (1891–1963), third Bishop of Egypt
- Francis Wayland Johnston (1882–1960), associate justice of the New Hampshire Supreme Court

== See also ==
- Frank Johnston (disambiguation)
- Francis Johnson (disambiguation)
