= Andrew Johnson National Cemetery =

Reconstruction-era historic cemetery

- U.S. National Register of Historic Places
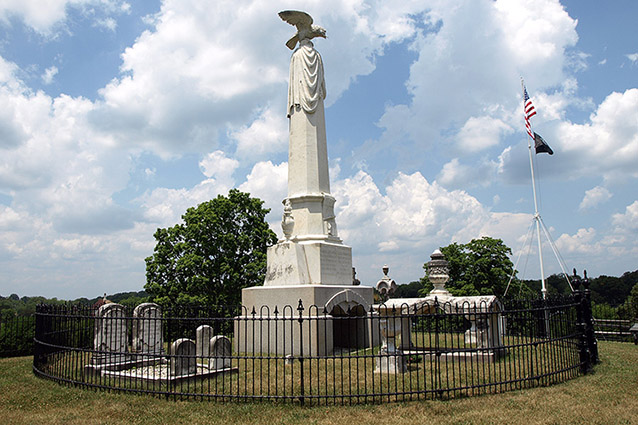
- The Johnson family plot
- Nearest city: Greeneville, Tennessee
- Coordinates: 36°09′20″N 82°50′16″W
- Website: Andrew Johnson National Cemetery
- NRHP reference No.: 66000073
- Added to NRHP: October 15, 1966

The Andrew Johnson National Cemetery is a United States National Cemetery on the grounds of the Andrew Johnson National Historic Site in Greeneville, Tennessee. Established in 1906, the cemetery was built around the resting place of Andrew Johnson, the 17th President of the United States, and holds more than 2,000 graves.

== History ==
Amidst some kind of dispute with his neighbors in 1847, Johnson wrote, "If I should happen to die among the damn spirits that infest Greeneville, my last request before death would be for some friend I would bequeath the last dollar to some Negro to pay—to take my dirty stinking carcass after death out on some mountain peak, and there leave it to be devoured by the vultures and wolves or make a fire sufficiently large to consume the smallest particle that it might pass off and smoke and ride upon the wind in triumph over the God-forsaken and hell-deserving, money-loving, hypocritical, backbiting, Sunday-praying scoundrels of the town of Greeneville." It seems that Johnson more or less kept this vow. Andrew Johnson acquired twenty-three acres outside Greeneville on "Signal Hill" in 1852. According to Robert W. Winston's Plebeian and Patriot (1928), "Though little given to sentiment, he pointed out this spot to a friend, saying that there he wished to rest and to take his final sleep. Searching out the owner, he acquired this property, and took a deed to the same."

It became known as Signal Hill due to being an excellent place for soldiers to signal to friendly forces. When Johnson died, he was buried on the property on August 3, 1875. The funeral was performed by Freemasons. On June 5, 1878, a 28-foot (8.5 m) tall marble statue was placed by Johnson's grave. The monument was considered so dominant that the place came to be known as Monument Hill.

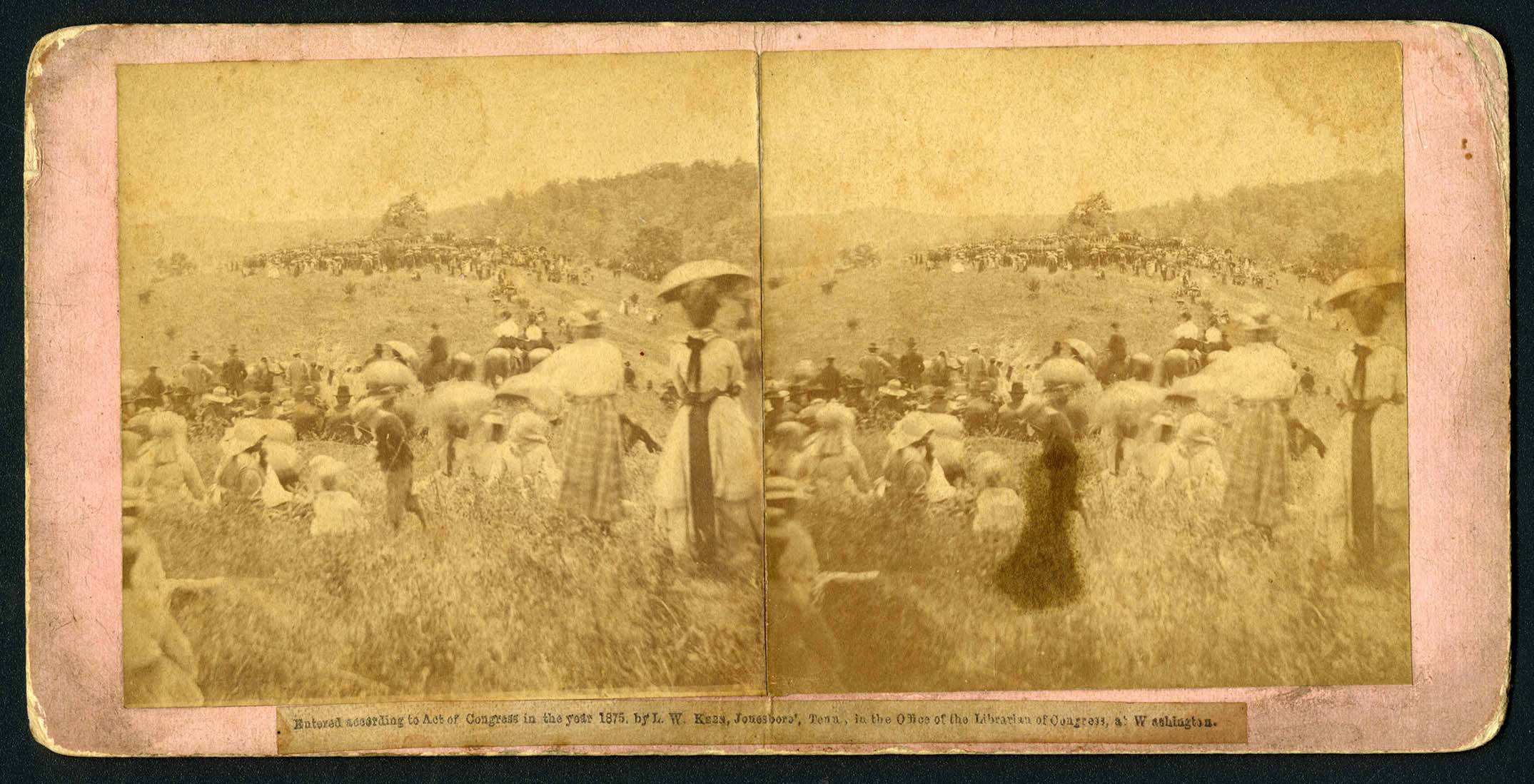
One of the 12 stereographic views of Andrew Johnson's funeral taken by L.W. Keen, photographer of Jonesboro Tenn., shows the crowd climbing the hill to Johnson's burial site (Tennessee State Library and Archives, item 42274)

Andrew Johnson's daughter Martha Johnson Patterson willed on September 2, 1898, that the land become a park. She further pushed in 1900 to make the site a national cemetery, so that instead of the Johnson family maintaining it, the federal government would. The United States Congress chose to make the site a National Cemetery in 1906, and by 1908 the United States War Department took control of it. By 1939 there were 100 total graves in the cemetery. On May 23, 1942, control of the cemetery went to the National Park Service.

When the National Park Service was given jurisdiction of the cemetery in 1942, they ruled to allow no more interments, in order to preserve the historic nature of the cemeteries. Due to efforts by the American Legion and the Daughters of the American Revolution, the cemetery once again accepted new interments, making the national cemetery one of the few controlled by the National Park Service to contain soldiers of the World Wars, Spanish–American War, Korean War, Vietnam War, and the Gulf War. It stopped accepting new burials in 2019, leaving Andersonville National Cemetery as the only National Cemetery under the United States Department of the Interior to accept new burials.

== Johnson monument ==
At the time of Johnson's death in 1875, a Knoxville paper wrote that the burial place was called Johnson's Hill, located about .5 mi (0.80 km) southeast of town, and could be seen "the right of the railroad as you approach Greeneville from the west."

When the area was made into a cemetery following the death of Andrew Johnson, two of Andrew Johnson's sons were reinterred: Charles Johnson, who had originally been buried in Nashville, Tennessee, and Robert Johnson, originally buried elsewhere in Greeneville. Several other members of the Johnson family, including grandchildren, would later be buried in the cemetery. Amongst these are his daughter Martha and her husband, former Tennessee United States Senator David T. Patterson.

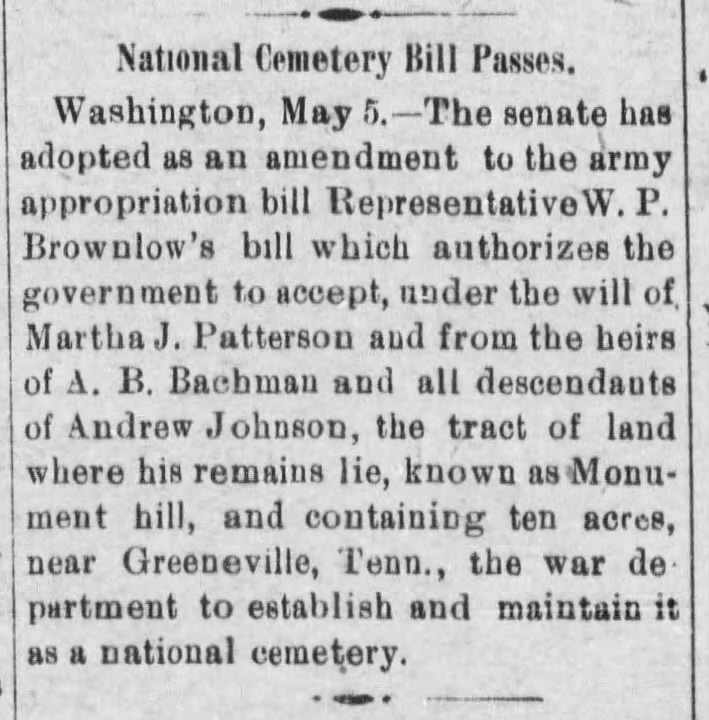
"National Cemetery Bill Passes" (The Comet, May 10, 1906)

The 26 ft (7.9 m)-tall monument was made in Philadelphia and was paid for by the three surviving Johnson children, Martha, Mary, and Frank. The marble monument depicts the United States Constitution, an eagle, and the Bible. The cost was said to be US$10,000 (equivalent to $333,621 in 2025) with the carving of the eagle costing US$500 (equivalent to $16,681 in 2025) on its own. The base, granite "with a plinth die," is 9 ft 6 in (2.90 m) square. The monument was dedicated in 1878. Planned speakers for the dedication ceremony were former United States and Confederate States congressman George W. Jones and biographer of First Ladies Laura C. Holloway.

Johnson's grave marker is inscribed "his faith in the people never wavered." One newspaper account of Andrew Johnson's life, published in 1891, stated "There is something singularly enigmatic in the epitaph, for no one ever knew precisely what is meant by 'His faith in the people never wavered.'"

It is supposed that they were well-satisfied that their work would be the only monument ever erected to the man. Of one thing we may feel quite sure, unless there is a great change in the feelings of the American people Andrew Johnson is one dead American to whose memory no public monument of any great value will ever be reared.

— M.V. Moore, 1891

== Additional images ==
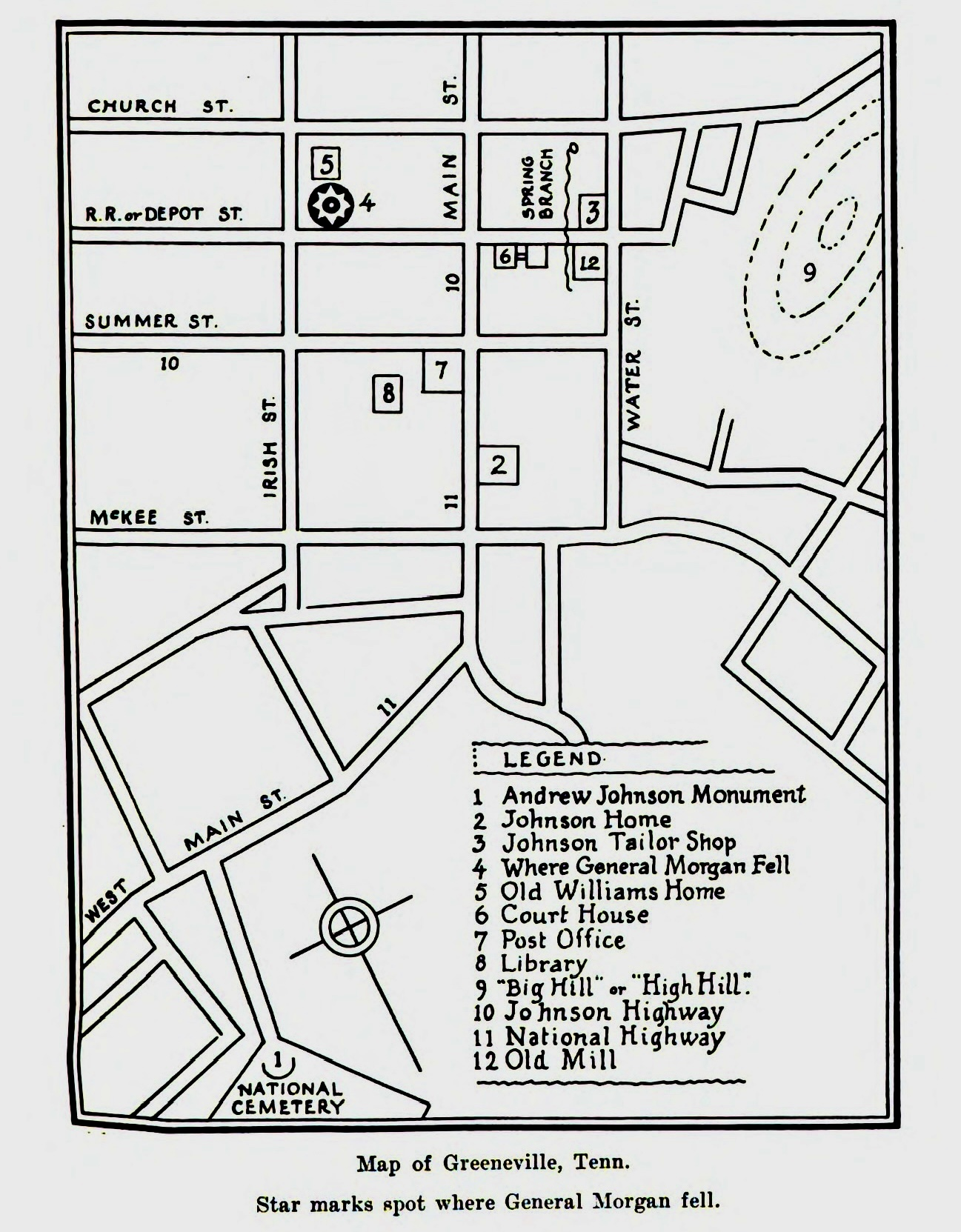
1928 map of Greeneville showing entrance to cemetery

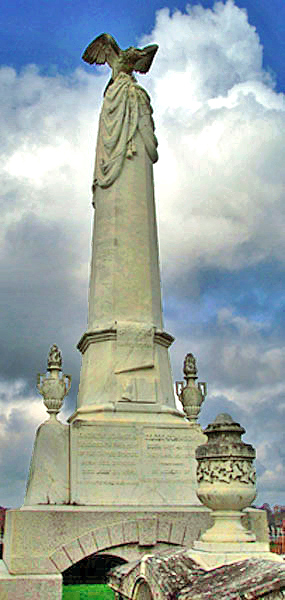
Andrew Johnson's grave

== See also ==
- List of cemeteries in Tennessee
- List of burial places of presidents and vice presidents of the United States
- Greeneville Historic District (Greeneville, Tennessee)
