= Franklin Johnson =

Franklin Johnson may refer to:

- Franklin Johnson (Wisconsin politician) (1849–1935), member of the Wisconsin State Assembly
- Franklin W. Johnson (1870–1956), president of Colby College
- Franklin Pitcher Johnson Jr., American venture capitalist
- Pitch Johnson (1901–1967), born Franklin Pitcher Johnson, American track and field athlete
- Franklin Johnson, author of Fallacies of the Higher Criticism in the fundamentalist Christian text The Fundamentals
- Franklin D. Johnson, member of the Legislature of the US Virgin Islands

== See also ==
- Frank Johnson (disambiguation)
