= Andrew Johnson Jr. =

Son of U.S. President (1852–1879)

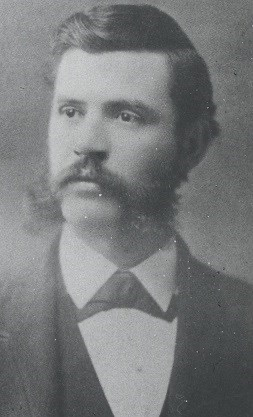
- Born: Andrew Johnson Jr. August 5, 1852; Greeneville, Tennessee, U.S.
- Died: March 12, 1879 (aged 26); Union Depot, Tennessee, U.S.
- Occupations: Newspaper editor, farmer, cotton mill manager
- Known for: Son of U.S. President

Andrew Johnson Jr. (August 5, 1852 – March 12, 1879), generally known as Frank Johnson, was the fifth and last child born to Eliza McCardle Johnson and her husband Andrew Johnson, who served as the 17th U.S. president from 1865 to 1869. Like his brothers, he died young, possibly due to complications from alcoholism.

== Early life and the American Civil War ==
The first four Johnson children, Martha, Charles, Mary, and Robert, were born in quick succession, every two years from 1828 to 1834; Frank was born in Greeneville 18 years after the next-oldest sibling. In 1860, at age eight, Frank was enumerated in his father's household in Greeneville along with his mother and two older brothers. When the American Civil War broke out, U.S. Senator Andrew Johnson left his family behind in East Tennessee while he traveled for work; Frank stayed with his mother Eliza at his older sister Mary's home in Carter County, Tennessee. The family was reunited at Nashville in 1863. Generally speaking, "his father was often absent during Frank's childhood." Frank lived at the White House as a teenager, alongside the five young children of his much older sisters, Martha Patterson and Mary Stover. He attended Georgetown Academy during his time in Washington, D.C. He attended Vermont Episcopal School for the 1865–66 term.

== Working life and pursuit of political office ==
At the time of the 1870 census he was enumerated as Franklin Johnson and was working as a "clerk in store" at Greeneville. This was apparently the shop owned by his brother-in-law William R. Brown, his sister Mary's second husband. In 1870 a visiting reporter from Cincinnati described him as a "genteel-looking youth." Frank Johnson's main occupation in adulthood was as a journalist and newspaper editor of the Greeneville Intelligencer, a weekly newspaper. According to the Andrew Johnson Biographical Companion, the newspaper was "doubtless established to support his father's candidacy for Senate." His partner in this was Thomas Maloney, who had worked as a private secretary for his father and who married his niece Lillie Stover in 1875. In August 1876 he ran for election to a seat in the Tennessee state legislature but was defeated in the primary.

Frank Johnson married, November 25, 1875, in Madison County, North Carolina, Kate May "Bessie" Rumbough, a daughter of James Rumbough of Warm Springs, North Carolina. The groom was 23, the bride was 18 years old. Apparently within a year she had left the marital home and moved back in with her parents "because of her husband's drinking." Frank Johnson, like his brothers before him, battled with alcoholism for the better part of his adult life. Johnson later worked as a farmer in Carter County, Tennessee, until the heirs of Andrew Johnson came into possession (apparently due to foreclosure on a mortgage) of a cotton mill at Union, Sullivan County, Tennessee, now called Bluff City, which he managed.

== Death ==
A newspaper briefly mentioned Johnson the year prior to his death, at the time of the dedication of the Johnson monument in Greeneville: "Andrew Johnson, the ex-President's only son, had a newspaper here for a time, and at one time took part in politics to some extent, but he exhibited little desire for public life and latterly has given up all interest in it. He is quite young however and may come into public notice in the future." His death at age 26 at his home in Union Depot, was described as sudden and "quite unexpected." The cause was reportedly tuberculosis, possibly complicated by alcoholism. Johnson was buried on Monument Hill, the family burial ground at Andrew Johnson National Cemetery. He died without issue. Although "He had his faults, and who has not?" noted The Tennessean, Frank Johnson was remembered as "genial, cultured, friendly, and popular."

== See also ==
- List of children of presidents of the United States
- Greeneville Historic District (Greeneville, Tennessee)
- 1874–75 United States Senate elections
- Andrew Johnson alcoholism debate
