= Frances Johnson (disambiguation) =

Frances Johnson was the last fluent speaker of the Takelma language.

Fran(ces) Johnson may also refer to:

- Frances Johnson-Morris, a Liberian lawyer, judge, and politician
- Frances Johnson, novel by Stacey Levine
- Frances Beverly Johnson, wife of Thomas S. Monson
- Frances Reynolds Johnson, actress and wife of William V. B. Van Dyck
- Begum Johnson (1728–1812), née Frances Croke, an eminent inhabitant of British Calcutta
- Fran Johnson, DC Comics character

== See also ==
- Francis Johnson (disambiguation)
- Frances Johnston, photographer
