= Frank Johnston =

Frank Johnston may refer to:

- Frank Johnston (artist) (1888–1949), visual artist and member of the Group of Seven
- Frank Johnston (politician) (1929–2017), politician in Manitoba, Canada
- Frank Johnston (priest) (1930–2023), Anglican priest and military chaplain
- Frank Johnston (rugby league) (1914–1981), Australian rugby league player

== See also ==
- Francis Johnston (disambiguation)
- Frank Johnson (disambiguation)
- Francis Johnson (disambiguation)
