= Francis Johnson (MP) =

English politician

Francis Johnson (died 1605), of Aldeburgh, Suffolk, was an English politician.

He was a member (MP) of the parliament of England for Aldeburgh in 1597.
