= Frank Johnson (1930s outfielder) =

American baseball player

- Outfielder

Negro league baseball debut
- 1932, for the Monroe Monarchs

Last appearance
- 1932, for the Monroe Monarchs

Teams
- Monroe Monarchs (1932)

Frank Johnson is an American former Negro league outfielder who played in the 1930s.

Johnson played for the Monroe Monarchs in 1932. In 11 recorded games, he posted two hits in 14 plate appearances.
