= Eliza McCardle Johnson =

First Lady of the United States from 1865 to 1869

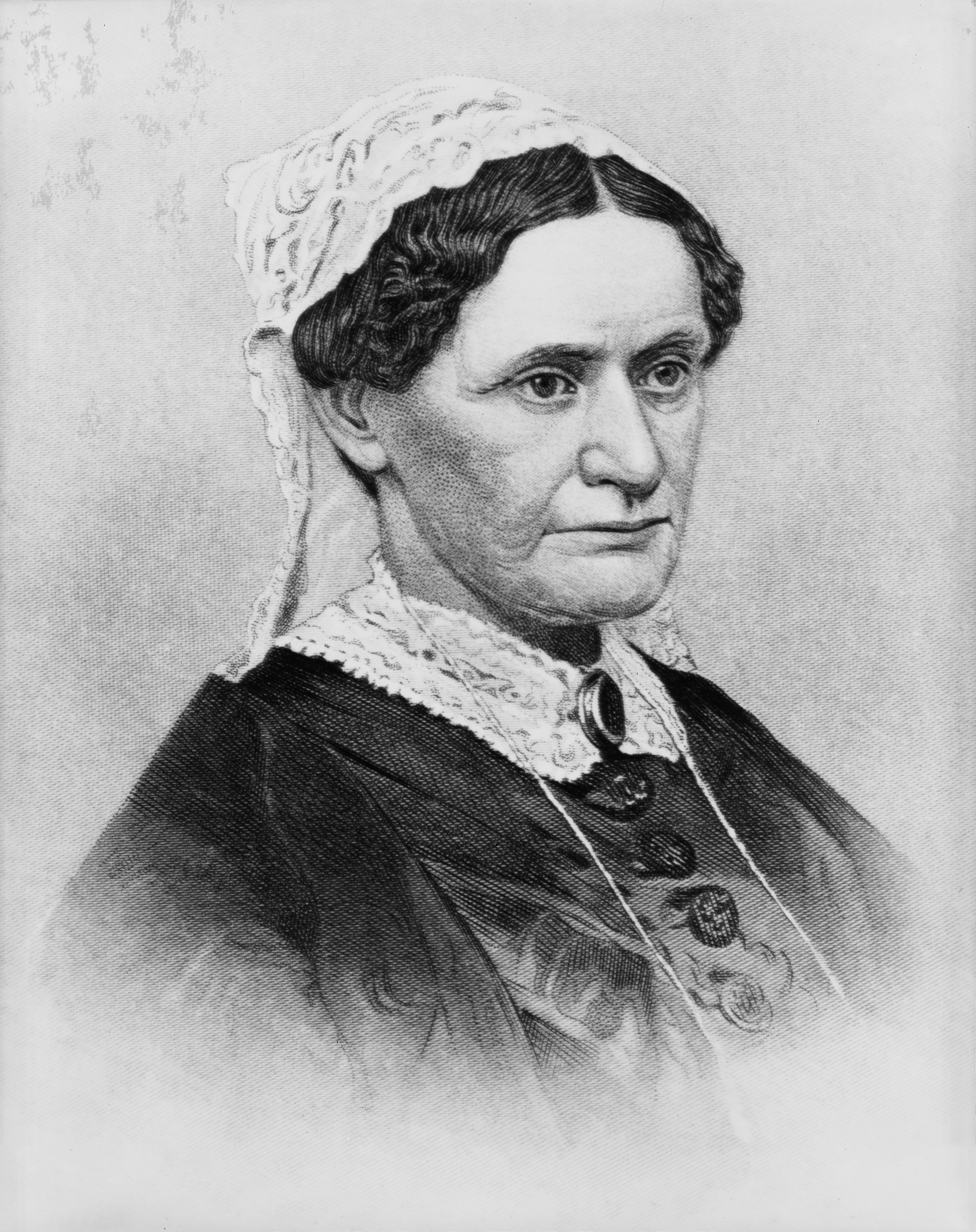
- Official portrait, as engraved 1883

First Lady of the United States
- In role April 15, 1865 – March 4, 1869
- President: Andrew Johnson
- Preceded by: Mary Todd Lincoln
- Succeeded by: Julia Grant

Second Lady of the United States
- In role March 4, 1865 – April 15, 1865
- Vice President: Andrew Johnson
- Preceded by: Ellen Hamlin
- Succeeded by: Ellen Colfax

First Lady of Tennessee
- In role October 17, 1853 – November 3, 1857
- Governor: Andrew Johnson
- Preceded by: Frances Owen
- Succeeded by: Martha Mariah Travis
- In role March 12, 1862 – March 4, 1865
- Governor: Andrew Johnson
- Preceded by: Martha Mariah Travis
- Succeeded by: Eliza O'Brien

Personal details
- Born: Eliza McCardle; October 4, 1810 Greeneville, Tennessee, U.S.
- Died: January 15, 1876 (aged 65) Greeneville, Tennessee, U.S.
- Resting place: Andrew Johnson National Cemetery; Greeneville, Tennessee, U.S.
- Spouse: Andrew Johnson (m. 1827; died 1875)
- Children: Martha; Charles; Mary; Robert; Andrew Jr.

Eliza McCardle Johnson (née McCardle; October 4, 1810 – January 15, 1876) was the first lady of the United States from 1865 to 1869 as the wife of President Andrew Johnson. She also served as the second lady of the United States from March until April 1865 when her husband was vice president. Johnson was relatively inactive as first lady, and she stayed out of public attention for the duration of her husband's presidency. She was the youngest first lady to wed, doing so at the age of 16.

Johnson significantly contributed to her husband's early career, providing him with an education and encouraging him to strengthen his oratory skills and seek office. Johnson did not participate in the social aspects of politics, however, remaining at home while her husband took office. During the American Civil War, she was forced from her home for her family's Unionist loyalties. She was affected by tuberculosis throughout much of her life, and what activity she did choose to undertake was limited due to her health.

Johnson was briefly the second lady of the United States before becoming the first lady, as her husband was vice president until the assassination of Abraham Lincoln. After becoming the first lady, Johnson delegated the role's social duties to her daughter Martha Johnson Patterson. Though she only made two public appearances during her tenure as first lady, Johnson was a strong influence on her husband, and he would consult her regularly for advice. Johnson returned to her home of Greeneville, Tennessee with her family after leaving the White House, living a quiet retirement. She died six months after her husband and was buried beside him.

== Early life and marriage ==
Eliza McCardle was born in Greeneville, Tennessee on October 4, 1810. She was the only child of John McCardle, a cobbler and innkeeper, and Sarah Phillips. The family moved to Warrensburg, Tennessee while McCardle was young, but they returned to Greeneville following her father's death. McCardle was raised by her widowed mother, who financially supported her by weaving and taught her to read and write. McCardle attended school and received a basic education. She is believed to have attended the Rhea Academy in Greenville.

McCardle met Andrew Johnson when his family moved to Greeneville in September 1826. She is said to have first seen him while talking amongst her friends, who began to tease her when she expressed her interest in the tailor's apprentice. McCardle and Johnson began courting almost immediately. The Johnsons left the city later that year, and the couple exchanged letters until he returned in 1827. They married on May 17, 1827. Mordecai Lincoln, a first cousin once removed of Abraham Lincoln, presided over the nuptials. McCardle was 16 years old, making her the youngest to marry of all the first ladies of the United States. After marrying, the couple moved into a two room house, where one of the rooms served as a tailor shop.

Eliza Johnson provided her husband much of his formal education, though a common myth suggests that she even taught him to read and write. They had five children together: Martha in 1828, Charles in 1830, Mary in 1832, Robert in 1834, and Andrew Jr. in 1852. Once they began having children, much of Johnson's time was spent tending to the household while her husband operated his tailor shop. In 1831, they purchased a larger home as well as a separate facility for the shop. They moved to a larger home again in 1851.

== Politician's wife ==
=== Antebellum years ===
With Eliza's encouragement, her husband sought political office. She played a large role in his early political career, assisting him in his education and his oratory skill. As he attained higher political offices, Johnson avoided the social role associated with a politician's wife, instead tending to their home. By this point, the household included eight or nine slaves. It is unknown how Johnson felt about owning slaves. As Johnson's children came of age, she enjoyed seeing her daughters seek husbands and start families of their own. At the same time, her two older sons became a cause of stress as they were affected by alcoholism.

While at home, Johnson was responsible for managing the family's finances, including their many investments. Though she did not accompany her husband when he traveled for his work, she supported him, providing encouragement and helping him with his speeches. She suffered from tuberculosis, causing infirmity. Her health improved and worsened in turn over the following years, but she never fully recovered. She eventually traveled to Washington, D.C. in 1860 with her sons, staying until the American Civil War began the following year.

=== American Civil War ===
During the war, Johnson became an advocate for Southern Unionists that lived in the Confederate States of America. She was forced to move after the Confederate States Army occupied the region. She moved to her daughter Mary's farm after the Johnson home was captured by Confederate forces. While initially ordered to vacate the entire region within 36 hours in May 1862, she replied "I cannot comply with the requirement", and she was granted an additional five months.

Johnson eventually made the three week journey to Nashville, Tennessee, during which she was harassed and threatened for being the wife of a Unionist senator. The journey severely affected her health, but upon arriving in Nashville she reunited with her husband, who she had not seen in almost a year. She later traveled north, passing through Confederate lines without escort, going to Ohio and Indiana to visit her children. She returned to Nashville in May 1863. The Johnsons' eldest son, Charles, was killed later that year after being thrown from his horse. She had little reprieve in Nashville, rarely seeing her husband, especially after he began campaigning in the 1864 presidential election.

Johnson's husband was sworn in as the Vice President of the United States in March 1865. The following month, President Abraham Lincoln was assassinated, and her husband ascended to the presidency. This had a severe emotional effect on her; in one letter, her daughter Martha described her as "almost deranged" with worry that her husband would be assassinated as well. She also lamented the idea of becoming first lady, effectively rejecting the role.

== First Lady of the United States ==
Johnson traveled to Washington DC with her surviving children, her son-in-law David T. Patterson, and her grandchildren. They arrived on August 6, 1865. After arriving, she chose a room on the second floor directly opposite the president's office. Johnson was not able to serve effectively as first lady due to her poor health, and she remained largely confined to her bedroom, leaving the social chores to her daughter Martha. Though she disliked being the president's wife, she enjoyed the fact that her entire family all lived together.

Johnson would receive her husband's guests at the White House, but she appeared publicly as first lady on only two occasions: a celebration for Queen Emma of Hawaii in 1866 and a children's ball for the president's sixtieth birthday in 1868. In both instances, she did not rise while receiving guests. She also received many letters from the public while she was the first lady, often asking for political favors or access to the president. Her correspondences were managed by her daughter and the White House staff. Though she was not active publicly, Johnson was able to regularly engage in activities with her family with some assistance.

While living in the White House, Johnson often sewed and knitted, and she was frequently reading. Each day, she would make her way through the White House residence, checking on her husband and the staff or spending time with her grandchildren. She was close to the staff, treating both the white and black servants "as members of the household". Johnson took up causes of her own, including a financial contribution to orphanages in Baltimore, Maryland, and Charleston, South Carolina. She also managed to travel while she was first lady, visiting nearby cities such as Boston, New York, and Philadelphia in 1867.

Johnson did not have an active role in the politics of her husband's administration, though she gave him full support during his presidency, including during his impeachment. She took an interest in the proceedings, and the president would visit her each morning for her advice. She held a strong influence over the president, and he regularly considered her advice. She regularly monitored newspaper coverage of the presidency, clipping stories that she felt deserved the president's attention. She sorted them each day, showing him positive stories each night and then negative stories the following morning.

Johnson assisted the president with his speeches as she did in his previous political positions, and she worked to prevent the outbursts caused by his temper. Her fear for her husband's safety persisted throughout his presidency, as the assassination of Abraham Lincoln was still in recent memory. Despite her illness, she would still tend to her husband in certain areas, selecting his wardrobe for him and ensuring he was satisfied with the food provided for him. Johnson disliked living in the White House, and she was glad when her husband's term ended.

== Later life and death ==
The Johnsons returned to Greenville after leaving the White House in March 1869. Their son Robert killed himself the following month. Johnson lived a quieter life after ending her tenure as first lady, often spending her time with her children and grandchildren. She enjoyed some level of independence, sometimes traveling without her husband.Her health declined by the time her husband was elected to the United States Senate in 1875, and she moved in with her daughter Mary. She was widowed shortly afterward on July 31, 1875. Johnson's poor health and her grief prevented her from attending the funeral, but she was appointed to execute his estate. She died on January 15, 1876, at the age of 65, and was buried beside her husband in the Andrew Johnson National Cemetery.

== Legacy ==
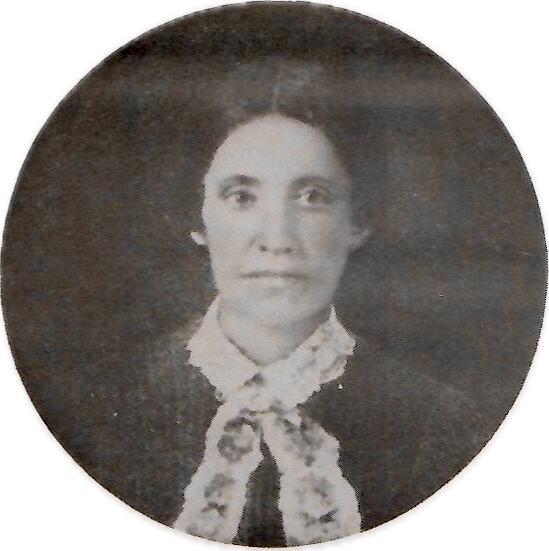
Locket image of Eliza McCardle Johnson, possibly created c. 1840. The locket was in the possession of great-granddaughter Margaret Johnson Patterson Bartlett (1903–1992) as of 1972; its current whereabouts are unclear.

Johnson was one of the least active first ladies, playing little role in the political or social aspects of the White House. Her influence was that of an educator and adviser to her husband. She did not meaningfully change the position of first lady during her tenure. Historians generally describe Johnson as unassuming and unable to fulfill the role of first lady, but also as a capable intellectual partner for her husband. Though her husband's reputation declined considerably over the following century, Johnson's reputation as first lady remained largely unchanged. Johnson's personal papers have been lost, in large part due to the Civil War. Most primary documents associated with her are among her husband's papers. In the 1982 Siena College Research Institute poll of historians, Johnson was ranked as the 21st of 42 first ladies.

Johnson returned to the practice common among 19th century first ladies in which she allowed a younger surrogate to perform much of her duties, reestablishing the practice after the highly public tenure of her predecessor Mary Todd Lincoln. She would be the last first lady to invoke illness in this fashion until Ida Saxton McKinley much later. Johnson may have avoided public attention specifically because of the intense criticism levied at her predecessor and the potential for similar criticism given her husband's controversial presidency. She may also have feared that she lacked the social talents required of a hostess. By the end of her tenure, she was described as "almost a myth" due to her limited public contact.

She would be played by Ruth Hussey in the 1942 film Tennessee Johnson, a biopic of her husband.

== See also ==
- Bibliography of United States presidential spouses and first ladies

Honorary titles
Preceded by Ellen Hamlin	Second Lady of the United States; 1865	Vacant Title next held by Ellen Colfax
Preceded by Mary Todd Lincoln	First Lady of the United States; 1865–1869	Succeeded by Julia Grant
