= Martha Johnson Patterson =

American political hostess (1828–1901)

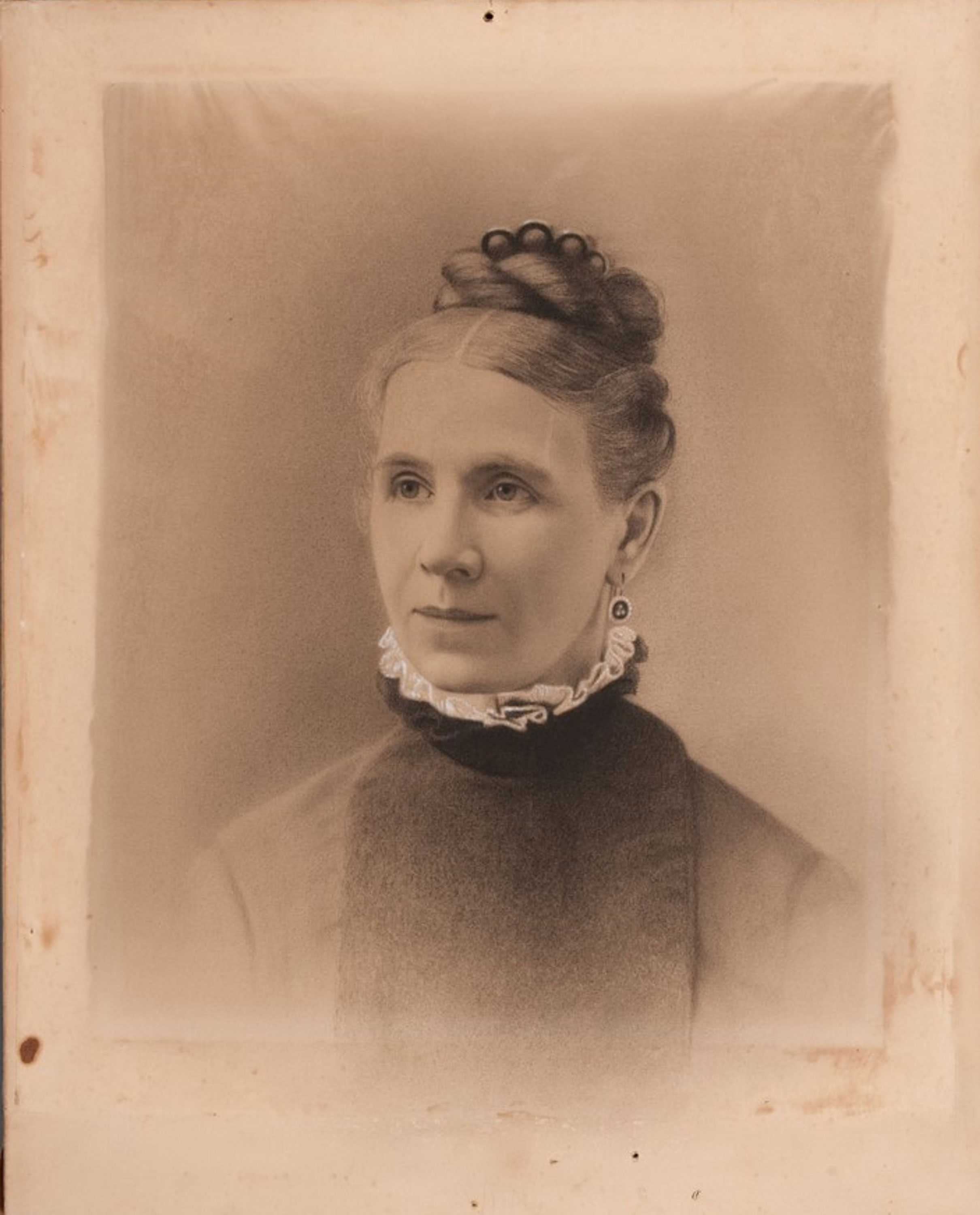
- Charcoal on paper portrait by M. L. Barlow c. 1880 (firstladies.si.edu)
- Born: October 25, 1828; Greeneville, Tennessee, U.S.
- Died: July 10, 1901 (aged 72)
- Resting place: Andrew Johnson National Cemetery; Greeneville, Tennessee, U.S.
- Spouse: David T. Patterson (m. 1855; died 1891)
- Children: 2
- Parents: Andrew Johnson (father); Eliza McCardle (mother)

Martha Johnson Patterson (née Johnson; October 25, 1828 – July 10, 1901) was the eldest child of Andrew Johnson, the 17th President of the United States and his wife, Eliza McCardle. She served as the White House hostess during her father's administration and directed the restoration of the White House following the American Civil War. A newspaper article published at the time of her death stated, "'Too much cannot be said in praise of her many virtues.'...president Johnson once told a United States Senator—still living in Washington—that Mrs. Patterson 'was the only child he had who had been a comfort to him, or taken pride in his career.'"

== Biography ==
Patterson was born on October 25, 1828, in Greeneville, Tennessee, the eldest of Andrew Johnson and Eliza McCardle's five children.

She attended local schools in the Greeneville, Tennessee area. While her father was serving in the U.S. House of Representatives, Patterson attended Miss L.S. English's Female Seminary in Georgetown (later known as the Georgetown Female Seminary) and spent time at the White House during the term of James K. Polk.

She married David T. Patterson on December 13, 1855. The couple had two children, a son named Andrew Johnson Patterson (1857–1932) and a daughter named Mary Belle Patterson Landstreet (1859–1891). Mary died during the same year as her father, who died on November 3.

After the American Civil War and the readmission of Tennessee as a state in 1866, her husband was elected to her father's seat in the United States Senate.

Patterson's father, Andrew Johnson became President of the United States after the assassination of Abraham Lincoln in 1865. Her mother, First Lady Eliza McCardle Johnson, suffered from ill health and had little interest in social functions, so Patterson took over hostess responsibilities. Eliza made only two public appearances during her tenure as First Lady. Patterson was a popular figure in Washington and set a friendly tone for White House social functions. She disarmed onlookers by announcing, "We are plain folks from Tennessee, called here by a national calamity. I hope not much will be expected of us."

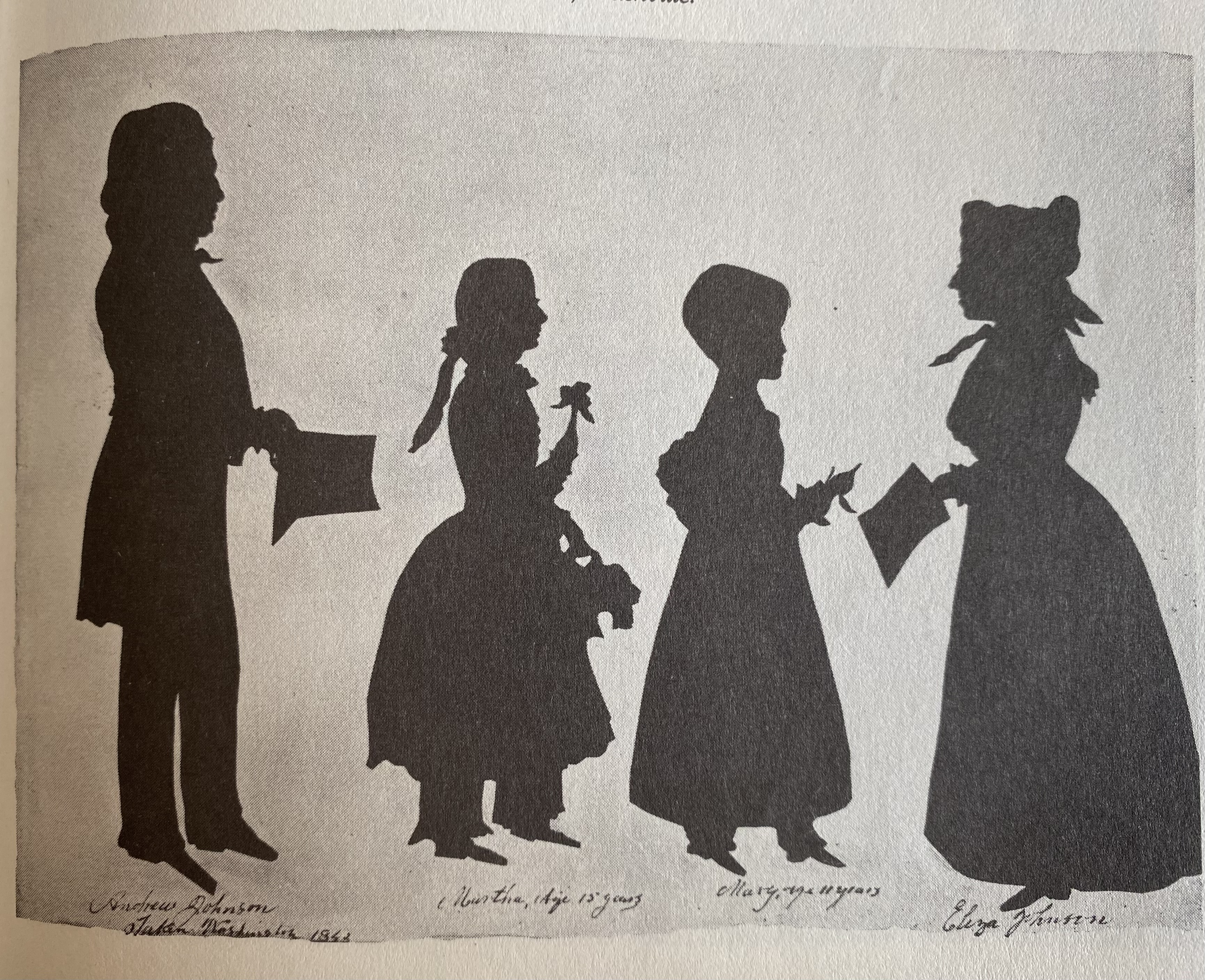
1853 silhouette of Andrew, Martha, Mary, and Eliza Johnson (Tennessee State Museum)

In keeping with her image as a country girl, Patterson brought two Jersey cows to the White House. The cows pastured on the lawn and Patterson milked them daily, "don[ning] a calico dress and a spotless apron." Just before the execution of Mary Surratt, her daughter Anna came to the White House, hoping to persuade Johnson to spare her mother's life. Denied access to the president, she lay weeping on the stairs to his office and was comforted by Patterson, who said there was nothing she could do to stop it.

The White House had fallen into disrepair after the Civil War. Much of the furniture was dirty and broken, the walls and floors were stained with tobacco juice, and the entire house was infested with insects. Patterson oversaw a $30,000 renovation of the White House. She hung new wallpaper, slipcovered old furniture, and used muslin cloth to cover the carpets during receptions. During her remodel of the White House, Patterson discovered a series of George P. A. Healy presidential portraits that were originally commissioned by Congress in 1857. Patterson framed and displayed them in the Transverse Hall where they can still be seen.

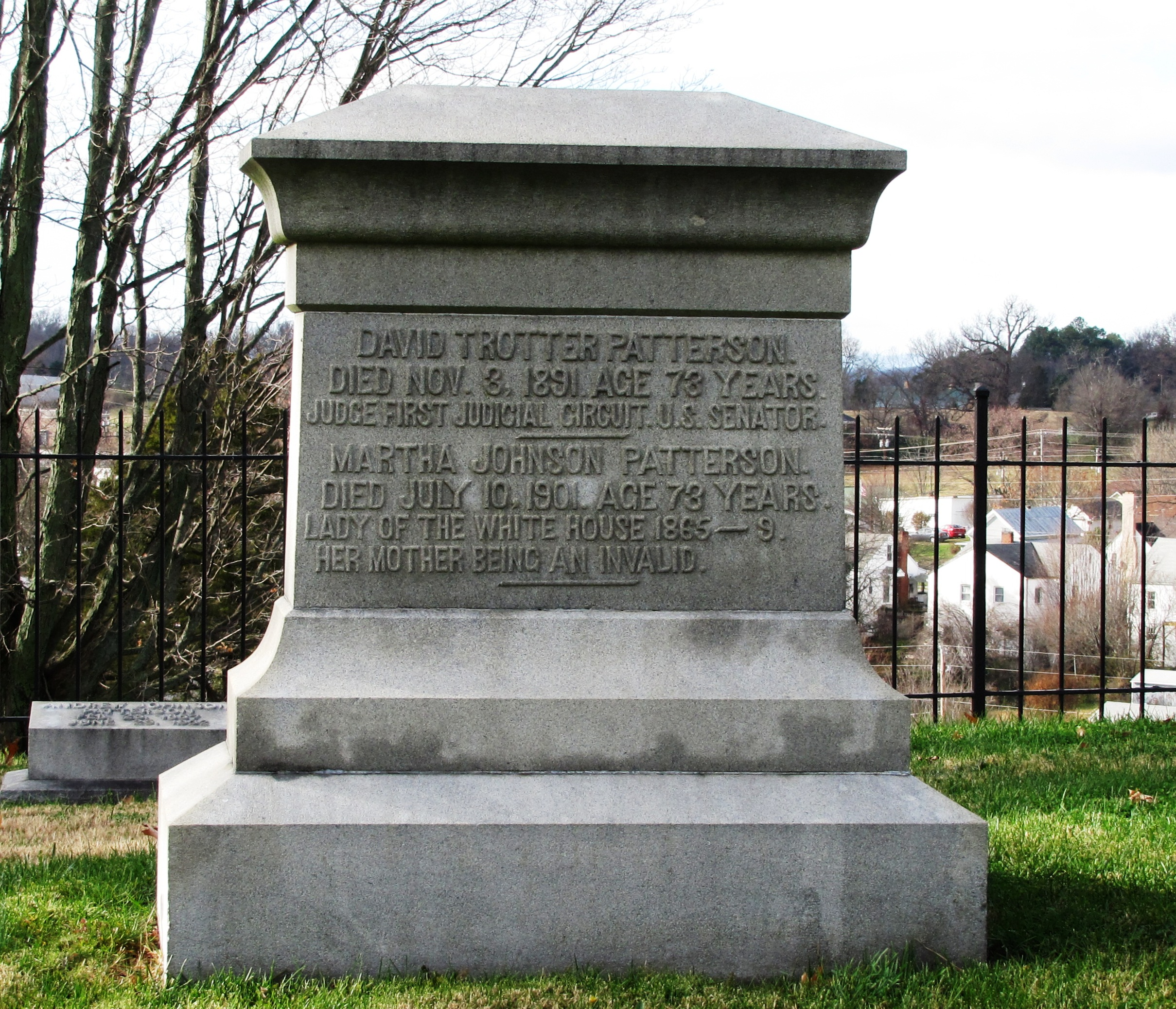
Grave of David and Martha Patterson, "the lady of the White House 1865–9, her mother being an invalid"

Patterson returned to East Tennessee after the conclusion of her father's presidency and lived there for the remainder of her life. A U.S. Army colonel who was born in Greeneville and whose family had been social with Johnson descendants, Fay W. Brabson, spent the better part of 60 years studying Andrew Johnson, beginning with a master's thesis in 1914, and wrote of Patterson in a Johnson biography published 1972:

The consequences of restricted friendships and an invalid wife were that, in his late years, as in the White House, Johnson leaned heavily on his older daughter, Martha, Mrs. David Patterson. She lived on a large farm, a few miles away, which her father had bought for her. Martha was a refined, thoughtful woman, and in the eyes of her father was almost the only faithful and devoted ally whom calumny could not change nor misfortune alienate. As a friend expressed it: "To her undying loyalty he gave his complete confidence. She loved him with a flaming devotion that must have been balm to his wounded spirit as he breasted the storm of hate that rose in opposition to his heroic efforts to save America for Americans."

She outlived all her siblings, her daughter, and two nieces. She remodeled the Johnson family home to her liking in late 19th century style, this work has since been removed so it has the appearance it had during Johnson's time. In later life she lived on a farm near Greeneville, and worked to preserve the overall legacy of her father. Patterson died on July 10, 1901. She is buried in Andrew Johnson National Cemetery in Greeneville, Tennessee.

== Descendants ==
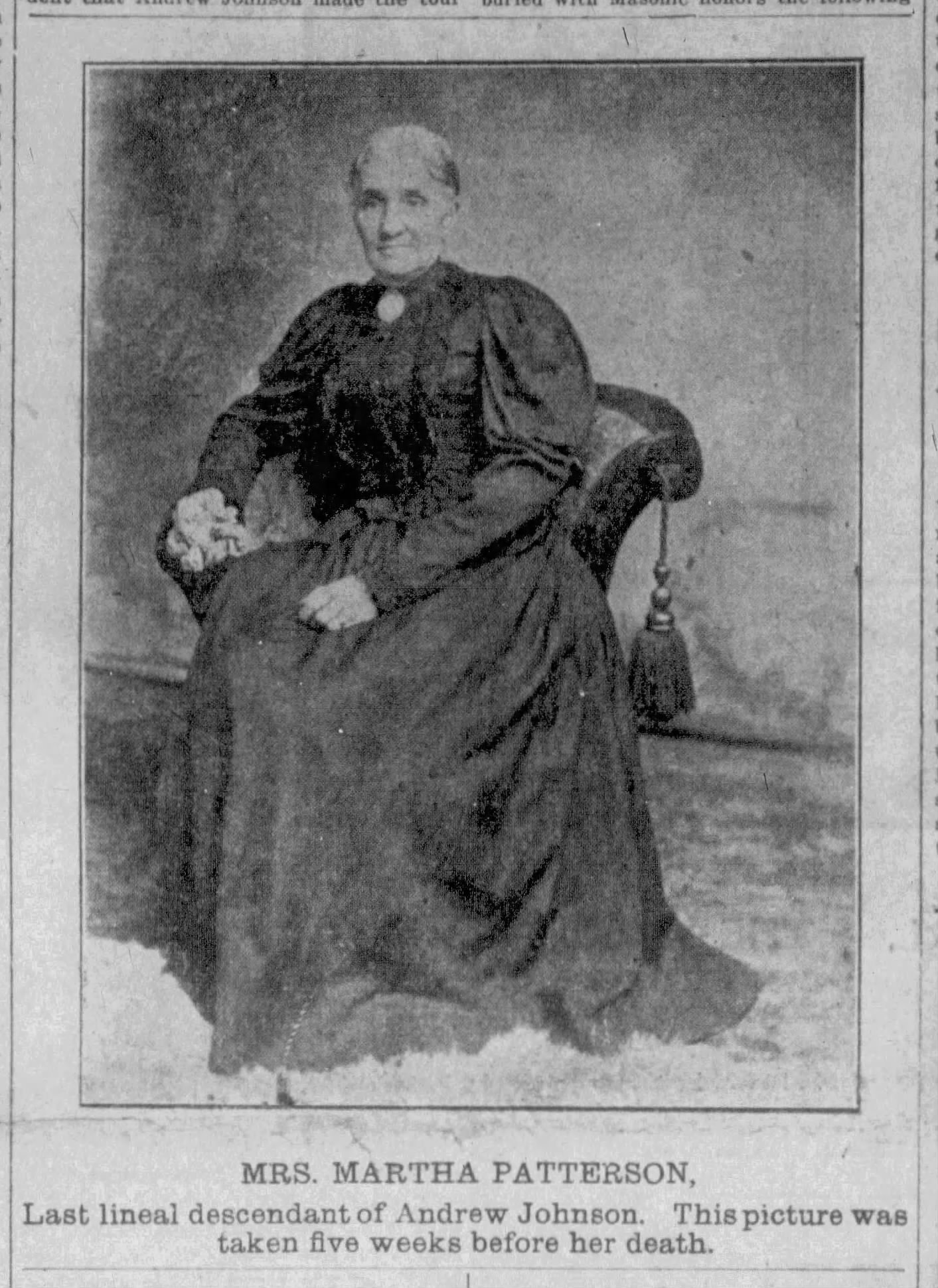
Mrs. Martha Patterson, Illustrated Nashville American, 1901

Children and grandchildren, etc. of David T. Patterson† and Martha Johnson Patterson†:

1. Andrew Johnson Patterson† (February 25, 1857 – June 25, 1932) m. December 3, 1889, Martha Ellen "Mattie" Barkley† (May 28, 1864 – March 23, 1948)
  1. Margaret Johnson Patterson† (September 29, 1903 – August 1, 1992) m. June 13, 1949, William Thaw Bartlett (1876 – 1954) — No apparent/known issue.
2. Mary Belle Patterson† (November 11, 1858 – July 9, 1891) m. February 7, 1886, John Landstreet Jr. (April 25, 1853 – August 1, 1927)
  1. Martha B. Landstreet† (August 6, 1887 – December 26, 1969) m. May 8, 1907, Robert J. Willingham (1875 – 1953)
    1. Martha Belle Willingham Colt — Married, had issue.
    2. Elizabeth Landstreet Willingham Crump — Married, had issue.

† indicates individual is buried in family burial plot at Andrew Johnson National Cemetery.

=== Andrew Johnson Patterson ===
Martha and David's son Andrew J. Patterson managed a family-owned cotton mill at Bluff City, Tennessee for a time, and then ran a joint-stock company that established the Jonesboro cotton mills. He also ran a flour mill and was elected a member of the Tennessee State Legislature. In 1894 Grover Cleveland appointed him consul to Demerara, British Guiana, a post he held until at least 1897. Immediately following Martha Patterson's death in 1901, Andrew J. Patterson organized an exhibit of Andrew Johnson artifacts at shop on Gay Street in Knoxville:

Among the articles on exhibition are Andrew Johnson's diary, his razor, the silk hat he wore in 1875, tickets to his impeachment trial, the official seal he used while president, the first ballot he cast, a paper weight he timed while president, made from the end of the first Atlantic cable, a lengthy petition from the citizens of South Carolina addressed to him and asking for the restoration of civil government in that state, an invitation to a social function in Nashville, a pair of Japanese slippers presented to President Johnson by the Japanese minister, a medallion of Andrew Johnson containing twenty dollars in silver, the smoothing iron, shears and thimble he used in his Greeneville tailor shop, the speech made by Gentry while opposing Johnson for governor in 1855, [and] the book Whiggery in Its New Dress, from which Johnson replied to Gentry.

The last Johnson family member buried in the Andrew Johnson National Cemetery was Martha Johnson Patterson's descendant Margaret Johnson Patterson Bartlett. After her father died, Margaret Bartlett inherited and curated the Johnson legacy for the rest of her life. She was also interviewed about the family over the years, such as on the occasion of the death of William Andrew Johnson, when she told reporters that William Andrew was the only one of Dolly Johnson's children to be born in Greeneville. Bartlett told interviewers about her father selectively burning letters prior to donating Andrew Johnson's correspondence to the Library of Congress. Bartlett commented, "...things that he thought was nobody's business, he'd burn them. And I'm glad he did. And here are some of these historians who are grabbers and like to feature that stuff—the fire has consumed them! And I'm glad of it. It's family. Private!" Researchers can only speculate but not know that "perhaps intimate letters between family members revealed the identity(ies) of the father of Dolly’s offspring."

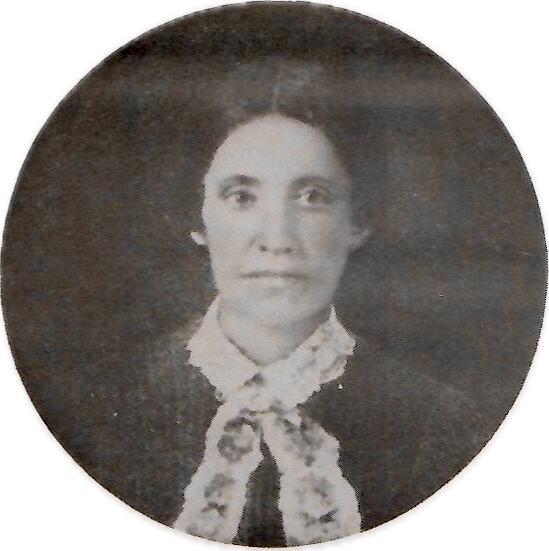
Locket image of Eliza McCardle Johnson, possibly created c. 1840; the locket was in the possession of great-granddaughter Margaret Johnson Patterson Bartlett as of 1972, its current whereabouts are unclear

As the reputation of Andrew Johnson and his role in the failure of Reconstruction is reevaluated by historians, Bartlett's role as the "foremost figure behind Greeneville's interpretation of Johnson from 1958 until 1993" is also being reassessed.

=== Mary Belle Patterson Landstreet ===
Martha and David's daughter Belle Patterson was in school in the north circa 1878. After Belle died of "a throat trouble" in California, her widower and their daughter were living in Patterson's house in Greeneville circa 1893. The only known living legitimate biological descendants of Andrew Johnson are through Martha > Belle > Martha > Martha and Elizabeth.

== Legacy ==
In the 1982 Siena College Research Institute asking historians to assess American first ladies, Patterson and several other non-spousal White House hostesses were included. The first ladies survey, which has been conducted periodically since, ranks first ladies according to a cumulative score on the independent criteria of their background, value to the country, intelligence, courage, accomplishments, integrity, leadership, being their own women, public image, and value to the president. In the 1982 survey, out of 42 first ladies and other White House hostesses, Patterson was assessed as the 32nd most highly regarded among historians. Non-spousal White House hostesses such as Patterson have been excluded from subsequent iterations of this survey.

== See also ==
- Mary Johnson Stover
- List of children of presidents of the United States
