= David T. Patterson =

American politician (1818–1893)

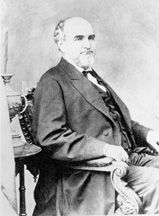

United States Senator from Tennessee
- In office July 28, 1866 – March 3, 1869
- Preceded by: Andrew Johnson
- Succeeded by: Parson Brownlow

Personal details
- Born: David Trotter Patterson; February 28, 1818 Greene County, Tennessee, U.S.
- Died: November 3, 1891 (aged 73) Afton, Tennessee, U.S.
- Resting place: Andrew Johnson National Cemetery; Greeneville, Tennessee, U.S.
- Party: Democratic
- Spouse: Martha Johnson Patterson (m. 1855)
- Children: 2

David Trotter Patterson (February 28, 1818 – November 3, 1891) was a United States Senator from Tennessee at the beginning of the Reconstruction period.

A staunch Union supporter (as were most of his fellow East Tennesseans), he was elected by the Tennessee General Assembly to the U.S. Senate when Tennessee was readmitted to the Union on July 24, 1866, the first state of the former Confederacy to do so. He presented his credentials to the Senate on July 26, but they were challenged; he was not permitted to take the oath of office until July 28.

== Early life and education ==
David Trotter Patterson was born at Cedar Creek, near Greeneville, Tennessee, on February 28, 1818. He attended the common schools and later Greeneville College for two years. He studied law with a local attorney to prepare for a legal career.

== Career ==
After being admitted to the bar in 1841, Patterson practiced in Greeneville. He also engaged in manufacturing. He owned slaves. He was appointed as a judge of the first circuit court of Tennessee and served from 1854 to 1863. In addition, he acquired substantial amounts of land in East Tennessee and grew commodity crops.

== Marriage and family ==
On December 13, 1855, Patterson married Martha Johnson, daughter of Andrew Johnson and Eliza McCardle. They had two children, a son named Andrew (1857–1932), and a daughter named Mary (1859–1891).

== Political career ==
A Unionist from East Tennessee, Patterson was elected by the Tennessee General Assembly to the U.S. Senate when Tennessee became the first Confederate state to be readmitted to the Union on July 24, 1866. His father-in-law Andrew Johnson had succeeded as President of the United States following Lincoln's assassination the year before.

Johnson was impeached by the United States House of Representatives in February 1868, which caused Patterson personal conflict. According to the U.S. Constitution, the Senate had the duty to try Johnson on the charges, and did so from March to May 1868. Their vote was one short of the constitutional requirement of a two-thirds majority for conviction. Patterson believed that his father-in-law was not guilty and that the charges against him were contrived. In the decades since the impeachment, historians generally have agreed to a consensus with the same conclusion, but some disagreed.

== Post-political career ==
Patterson retired from public life when his Senate term expired on March 3, 1869. He returned to East Tennessee to manage his relatively vast agricultural interests.

On November 3, 1891, Patterson died in the small community of Afton. He was interred with the Johnson family in the Andrew Johnson National Cemetery in Greeneville.

U.S. Senate
| Preceded by Andrew Johnson^{(1)} | U.S. senator (Class 1) from Tennessee; 1866–1869; Served alongside: Joseph S. Fowler | Succeeded by Parson Brownlow |
Notes and references
1. Because of Tennessee's secession, the Senate seat was vacant for four years before Patterson succeeded Johnson.
