= Greeneville Historic District (Greeneville, Tennessee) =

Historic district in Tennessee, United States

- U.S. National Register of Historic Places
- U.S. Historic district
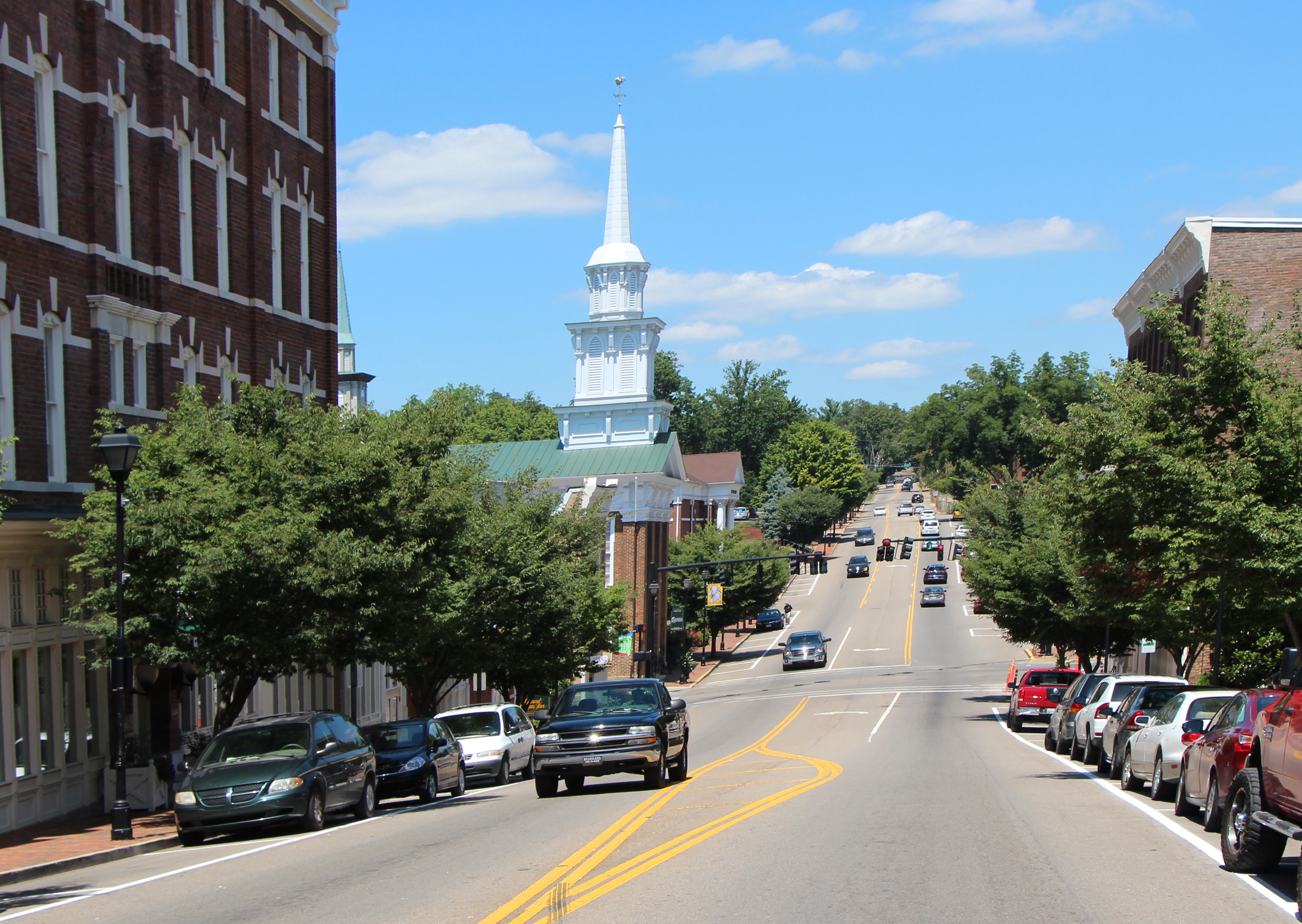
- Main Street, Greeneville, Tennessee

- Location within Tennessee Location within the United States
- Location: Roughly bounded by Irish, Nelson, E. Church, College and McKee Sts., Greeneville, Tennessee
- Area: 135 acres (55 ha)
- Architect: Multiple
- Architectural style: Greek Revival, Late Victorian, Federal
- NRHP reference No.: 74001913
- Added to NRHP: May 3, 1974

Greeneville, the county seat of Greene County was established in the late eighteenth century, and is one of the most important towns in historic East Tennessee. Although many of the early buildings have been destroyed, there remain yet a large number of buildings important from either a historical or architectural standpoint.

The Greeneville Historic District consists of an area a block in each direction of Main Street from McKee Street to Nelson Street, comprising an area of about 135 acres containing approximately 175 structures.

Greeneville was established in 1783 around a spring, which is located almost in the heart of town. It was named in honor of General Nathanael Greene of Revolutionary War fame, and was settled by the Scotch-Irish. Its location along important early trade and stage routes caused it to become an important community in the years before the Civil War. Its citizens became prosperous enough to build substantial dwellings, and places of business, many of which form the heart of the historic district.

== List of historic structures ==
Representative buildings
Name	Address	Year Built	Architectural Style	Comments
Hotel Brumley Hotel Brumley, now known as The General Morgan Inn, Greeneville, TN	109 North Main Street	1884	Unclassified	It was first called the Grand Central, and was considered to be the finest hotel "from Chattanooga to Roanoke."
Cumberland Presbyterian Church Greeneville Cumberland Presbyterian Church, Greeneville, TN	201 North Main Street	1860s	Greek Revival/Italianate architecture	The building was constructed on land purchased from Andrew Johnson. During the Civil War it was used as both a hospital and a stable. On September 4, 1864, it was shelled.
First Presbyterian Church First Presbyterian Church, Greeneville, TN	110 North Main Street	1847	Greek Revival	Established in 1780, this congregation is the oldest in Greeneville and had more than 1,000 members before 1790.
Saint James Episcopal Church St. James Episcopal Church, Greeneville, TN	105 North Church Street	1850	Gothic Revival	It has a slave gallery and an organ which is reported to be the oldest in Tennessee.
Valentine Sevier House Valentine Sevier House, Greeneville, TN	214 North Main Street	1822	Federal	Built by a nephew of John Sevier, Tennessee's first governor.
W. H. Doughty House W.H. Doughty House, Greeneville, TN	309 North Main Street	1906-07	Greek Revival	
Antrium Antrium Log Cabin, Greeneville, TN	307 North Main Street	Circa 1800	Log Cabin	This was built in rural Greene County and moved to its present location in 1965.
Andrew Johnson Home Andrew Johnson Home, Greeneville, TN	217 South Main Street	Circa 1851	Federal/Greek Revival	This was purchased by Andrew Johnson and lived in until his death, with the exception of the time he spent in Nashville and Washington D.C. as governor, congressman, senator, and president.
Susong House Susong House, Greeneville, TN	202 South Main Street	1795	Originally a Log Cabin, subsequently covered with clapboard	This was a two-story log house built by Valentine Sevier and later covered with clapboard. It is the oldest building in Greeneville.
Clawson-McDowell-Brown Home Clawson-McDowell-Brown Home, Greeneville, TN	204 South Main Street	1810	Federal	
Lowry Snapp House Lowry-Snapp House, Greeneville, TN	216 South Irish Street	Circa 1840s	Unclassified	
Armitage-McKee Law Office Armitage-McKee Law Office, Greeneville, TN	Corner of McKee and Irish Streets	Circa 1860	Unclassified	
Dickson-Williams Mansion Dickson-Williams Mansion, Greeneville, TN	106 North Irish Street	Circa 1820	Unclassified	It was perhaps the most imposing mansion in East Tennessee when it was built. During the Civil War it was used by both Union and Confederate armies as a headquarters. General Morgan spent his last night here, and was killed by Union Soldiers in the mansion's gardens.

== Other images ==
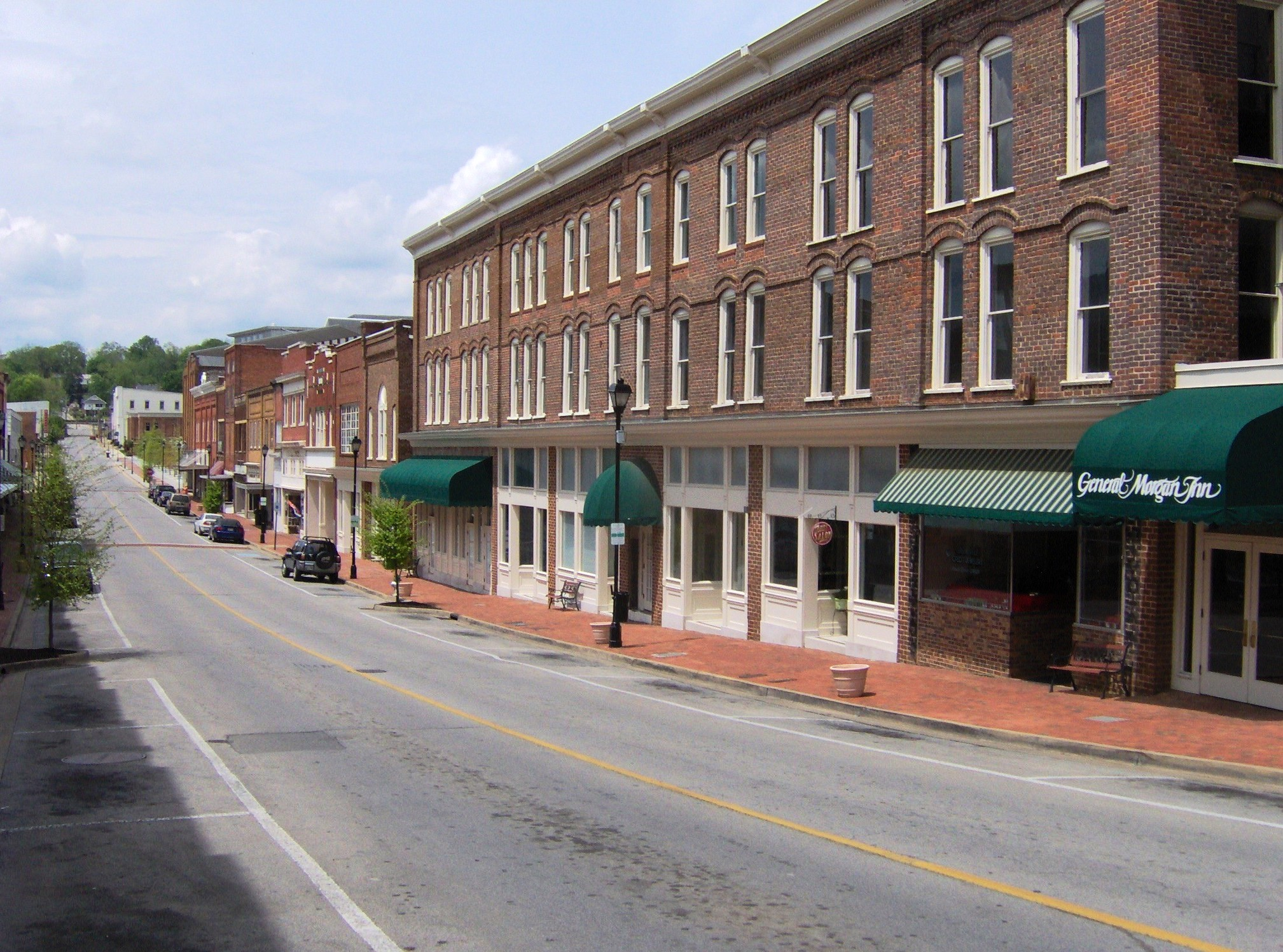
West Depot Street, which is included in the historic district

== See also ==
- Andrew Johnson National Historic Site
