= Time Works Wonders (political cartoon) =

1870 American artwork by Thomas Nast

- Artist: Thomas Nast
- Completion date: 9 April 1870
- Medium: Woodcut

Time Works Wonders is a political cartoon by American artist Thomas Nast depicting Nast's longtime target, Jefferson Davis, and U.S. Senator Hiram Revels, published in Harper's Weekly on April 9, 1870.

== Description ==
In the words of researcher John Adler, "Of the many villains on Nast's lifetime list, Jeff Davis probably ranked first." The cartoon inaccurately implies that Hiram Revels had succeeded to Davis' old seat in the United States Senate. Jefferson Davis had been a class 1 senator, Revels succeeded Albert G. Brown in the class 2 seat. Having abandoned the union of states for the ill-fated Confederacy, Mississippi was not represented in the United States Senate between 1861 and 1870. Revels was a North Carolina-born free man of color who had worked as a minister in the Natchez area and been a Mississippi state senator. Nast's cartoon shows Revels being welcomed to the Senate chamber by, left to right, Henry Wilson of Massachusetts, Oliver Morton of Indiana, Carl Schurz of Missouri, and Charles Sumner of Massachusetts, all of the Republican Party.

The caption is a line from act II, scene 1, of Othello: "For that I do suspect, the lusty Moor hath leap'd into my seat: the thought whereof doth like a poisonous mineral gnaw my inwards." Davis is cast as Shakespeare's malevolent Iago, ever motivated by an inchoate, irrational jealousy. Harper's Weekly, which published Nast's cartoons and was the New York-based newsmagazine of record, expected Revels to have much of Othello's "battlefield success." Nast frequently alluded to Shakespeare in his art, referencing 23 of the plays over the course of his career. Carl Schurz and Andrew Johnson were later Nast Iagos.

Nast seemingly depicts Revels on the day he made his inaugural address to the chamber, March 16, 1870. The speech is said to have had "enough manly power to reward those in the packed Senate galleries" including "black faces eager to hear Revels make history." According to a biographer of Senator Morton, "The robe Davis wears in the cartoon reminded readers of how he had been captured with a shawl wrapped about him, a fact that brought Northern accusations that he had dressed as a woman. Such a depiction mattered in the face of Southern conceptions of manhood and honor, as the former leader of the defeated Confederacy was humiliated, emasculated, and shamed by the African American being elected to the Senate." The cartoon was part of a series of Reconstruction-era images by Nast that spoke to "emotions stirred by the grinding years of war [that] could not readily be put to rest. The memory of so much death and suffering needed the balm of a substantial assurance that the cost had been worthwhile, that the ideals fought for would be translated into reality."

== See also ==
- Andy's Trip – 1866 American artwork by Thomas Nast
- Amphitheatrum Johnsonianum – 1867 American artwork by Thomas Nast
- Southern Justice (political cartoon) – 1867 American artwork by Thomas Nast

== Sources ==
- Adler, John (2022). America's Most Influential Journalist: The Life, Times and Legacy of Thomas Nast. Harpweek Press. ISBN 978-0-578-29454-4.
- Diffley, Kathleen (Spring 2022). "The New Era's More Civil War: How Big a Tent?". African American Review. 55 (1): 17–31. doi:10.1353/afa.2022.0001. ISSN 1945-6182.
- Fuller, A. James. (2017). Oliver P. Morton and the Politics of the Civil War and Reconstruction. The Kent State University Press. doi:10.1353/book55892. ISBN 978-1-63101-270-9.
- Keller, Morton (1968). The Art and Politics of Thomas Nast. New York: Oxford University Press. LCCN 68-19762. OCLC 2807107.
- Summers, Mark Wahlgren (2014). The Ordeal of the Reunion. University of North Carolina Press. doi:10.5149/northcarolina/9781469617572.001.0001. ISBN 978-1-4696-1757-2.
