= Breakdown (music) =

Part of a song

In music, a breakdown is a section of a song in which various instruments have solo parts (breaks). This may take the form of all instruments playing the verse together, and then several or all instruments individually repeating the verse as solo parts.

Breakdowns are a popular musical section, particularly in bluegrass, notable examples being Earl Scruggs' "Foggy Mountain Breakdown" and Bill Monroe's "Bluegrass Breakdown".

== Definition and origins ==
According to music historian Allen Lowe the definition of a breakdown is complex and contested, with different shades of meaning in different musical genres, including both white and black American musical history. It is characterized by solo performance, improvisation, and a focus on rhythmic or pentatonic patterns.

A Union soldier in Charleston, South Carolina, in 1865 recorded that young black people celebrating the end of the American Civil War with joyful singing in the streets "ended their songs with a 'shout' and a 'breakdown'." Celebratory songs included "Kingdom Coming" and "Oh we'll hang Jeff Davis from a sour apple tree".

== Disco and later dance music ==
Disco producer, mixer, and remixer Tom Moulton invented the "disco break" or breakdown section in the early 1970s. Moulton had been remixing a record (”Dream World” by Don Downing) which "immaculated" (modulated to a higher key) towards the end, and he wanted to cut parts together that were in different keys. To do this, he separated two sections with non-tonal information. He edited in a section of drums, and the aesthetic effect was pleasing to dancers at the club. The placement was also useful for club DJs, providing a rhythm-only section of the recording over which to begin mixing in the next record. Moulton says his innovation was an accident. The placement followed the pattern of a traditional pop recording: it replaced the bridge typically found in such a record after the second chorus.

A later example is the breakdown in "My Lovin' (You're Never Gonna Get It)" by En Vogue: a sampled male voice can be heard introducing this part of the record (at 3:27) with the sentence "and now it's time for a breakdown". Longer dance tracks often have two, three, or more breakdowns.

Initially, the transition to the breakdown was an abrupt absence of most of the arrangement in a disco record, as described above. Records in the hi-NRG style of the late 1970s to early 1980s would typically use a pronounced percussive element, such as a drum fill, to cover the transition. Later dance genres typically reach the breakdown section by a gradual reduction of elements, though a wide variety of styles have been employed since the mid-2000s.

In all genres, the stripping away of other instruments and vocals ("breaking-down" the arrangement) helps create intense contrast, with breakdowns usually preceding or following heightened musical climaxes. In many dance records, the breakdown often consists of a stripping away of the pitched elements (most instruments) – and often the percussion – while adding an unpitched or indistinctly pitched noise, a sound effect. This is often treated with a lot of reverb and rises in tone to build toward an exciting climax. This noise then typically cuts to a beat of silence, creating extra tension on the dance floor, before the drop – the sudden (and often percussive and volume-enhanced) return to the musical part of the track.

== Heavy metal and punk rock ==
Breakdowns are oftentimes found in metal and punk songs, as they can be used to eschew traditional verse–chorus–verse songwriting. The staff of Revolver assessed, "At this point in heavy-music history, the breakdown is as much a building block of metal as the thrash gallop, the blast beat and the rippin' solo." When played live, breakdowns are usually responded to by the audience with high-intensity moshing (slam dancing).

The drumming is usually simple, with a four quarter-note ride pattern with the snare on the third beat. Most commonly, the drummer plays quarter notes on the crash cymbal or China cymbal. In some breakdowns where a very slow tempo is used, the drummer will play half notes, to give the music a very "heavy", slow feel. The guitarist usually follows the rhythm, or "chugs" (uses palm-muted strokes on the lowest two to three strings of the guitar) along with the kick drum. In most cases, the drummer will use the kick drum to complement such "chugs" of the guitars.

The guitars play a set of rhythmically oriented riffs, usually on lightly palm-muted strings to achieve a very high attack noise that decays slowly, making the overall sound more thick and "heavy". Sometimes, these are contrasted with either dissonant chords, such as minor second intervals, tritones (flatted fifths), or pinch harmonics.

In punk, breakdowns tend to be more upbeat, using the floor toms and snare to create a faster, "rolling" rhythm. This provides audience members with an opportunity to skank, mosh, or form a circle pit.

Many of the bands that play in the genres of deathcore and metalcore make heavy use of breakdowns, which may consist of slow-paced strumming on the guitar, or fast syncopated triplet-feel patterns, both of which are typically palm-muted and played on the lowest three strings of a guitar, and may also involve a bass drop. These strings are usually tuned down from somewhere between Drop D all the way down to Drop Eb tuning. As in modern metal genres and in other punk subgenres, breakdowns in metalcore and deathcore are signals for moshing at live shows.

Breakdowns are sometimes criticized as "overused" by modern heavy metal acts.

== Bluegrass ==
In bluegrass music, a break is a short instrumental solo played between sections of a song and is conventionally a variation on the song's melody. A breakdown is an instrumental form that features a series of breaks, each played by a different instrument. Examples of the form are "Bluegrass Breakdown" by Bill Monroe as well as "Earl's Breakdown" and "Foggy Mountain Breakdown", both of which were written by Earl Scruggs.
