= Andy's Trip =

1866 American artwork by Thomas Nast

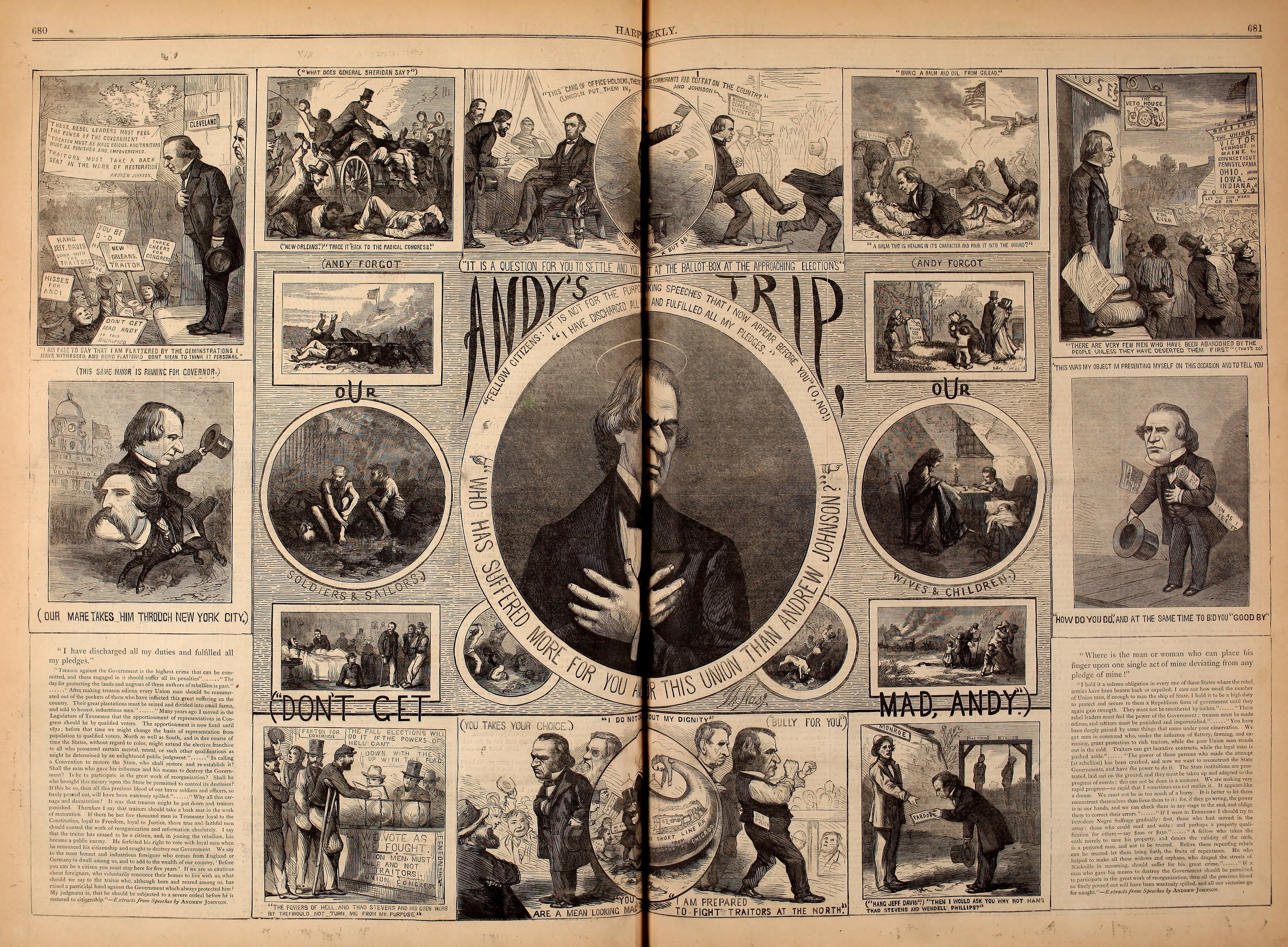
- Artist: Thomas Nast
- Completion date: October 27, 1866
- Medium: Woodcut
- Dimensions: 34.61 cm × 52 cm (13.625 in × 20.5 in)
- Website: Harper's Weekly (loc.gov)

Andy's Trip is a multi-panel political cartoon by American artist Thomas Nast depicting the 1866 electioneering trip of U.S. president Andrew Johnson that came to be known as the Swing Around the Circle. Published as a double-page spread in the October 27, 1866 issue of Harper's Weekly, the image "delivered a blow" and served as a "visual indictment of Johnson's behavior during his swing around the circle, divided by two dozen panels, with Johnson at the center wearing a halo and smiling beneath the words, a takeoff from his New York speech: 'Who has suffered more for you and for this Union than Andrew Johnson?'" According to historian Fiona Halloran, "Hammering away, Nast insisted that it was Johnson who 'forgot' Union veterans and Union families."

Rhetoric professor Brett Warnke puts Andy's Trip in a class of memorably ruthless takedowns of American presidents, along with works like Hunter S. Thompson's obituary of Richard M. Nixon and H. L. Mencken's commentary on the speeches of Warren G. Harding. Per Warnke, Johnson's behavior on the Swing "astonished the country. This hack was the President? Lincoln's heir? The nation's healer? ...Johnson, a half-literate East Tennessee tailor who delivered the same speech that was printed in the papers before he arrived, met crowds longing for something more than a Pretender's rehearsed and pitifully inarticulate wind...Nast scratched away any illusions about Johnson, revealing him as the petty, tempestuous, nasty little puke he was, in cartoons like Andy's Trip, where he mocks Johnson's faux martyrdom." One editorial writer quoted by historian James Ford Rhodes described the tour as revealing Johnson as "the first of our chief magistrates who believed in the brutality of the people and gave to the White House the ill-savor of a corner-grocery."

== Background ==
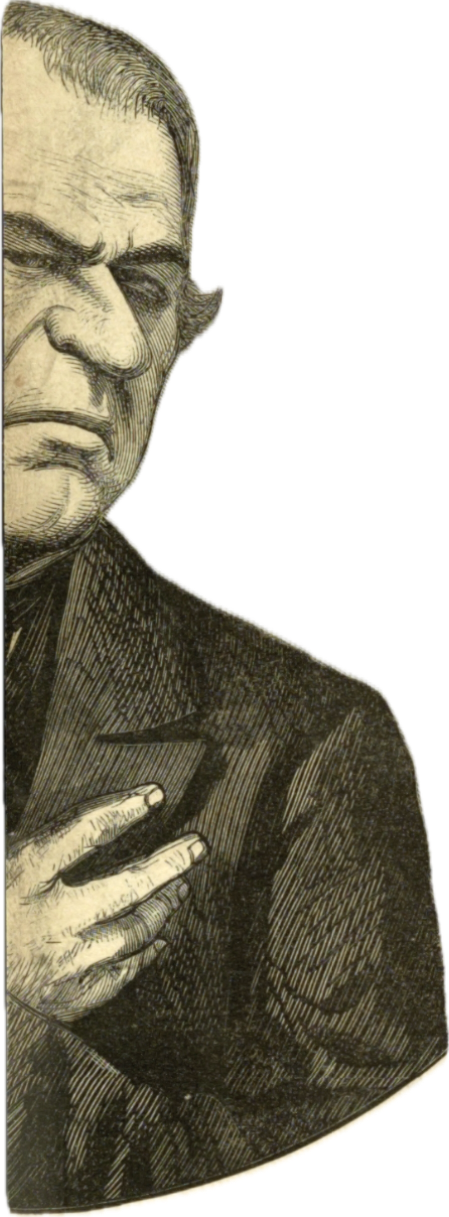
Central portrait of a "sanctimonious-looking, well-fed" Johnson

Over the course of the almost three week tour, Johnson had compared himself to Jesus and his enemies to Judas Iscariot more than once (for example, stating: "Yes...over 1800 years ago, there was a man who...descended from on high and finding that the whole world was condemned and sentenced under the law...put himself upon the cross and attested by his wounds and his blood, and there declared, instead of putting the world to death: 'I will die that man may live.' [Applause] Then if I have erred, it is in that") while "not once did he mention Lincoln" only referring to "his predecessor." At one point during his speech in Niagara Falls, according to the Weekly Journal of Fremont, Ohio, Johnson said "...friends of the country, friends that were personal to me, were anxious that I should be placed on the ticket, I was placed there; I accepted it; the race was run, the victory was obtained, and I was made Vice-President of the United States. Can't you see the gradation comes along regularly? And, then, by the Constitution of the country, I have been made President. I am glad of it." Reflecting on the "I am glad of it" and the reputations of the assassinated Abraham Lincoln—already known as the Martyr President—and his successor, Johnson, Fremont Weekly Journal editorialized, "Considering the circumstances under which Mr. Johnson came to be President of the United States, he could not have made use of a more unfortunate expression."

According to historian Gregg Phifer, Johnson's self-obsession on the tour ironically benefitted his political adversaries:

Radical politicians, preachers, and editors found the President a vulnerable target, more vulnerable than his policies. Johnson rose to the bait, complaining over and over again, as at St. Louis, 'I have been traduced, I have been slandered, I have been maligned..." Much of his speaking time was devoted to Radical charges of excessive pardons, tyrannical use of the veto, usurpation of the congressional prerogative in reconstruction, lack of United States citizenship, misuse of the federal patronage, and betrayal of the party that elected him. And the more time he spent in self defense, the less he could use for debate on Negro suffrage, the fourteenth amendment, economy, and other issues the Radicals would rather postpone until after the election.

== Image details ==
Details of Andy's Trip
Image	Caption text	Additional information
	"Who has suffered more for you and for this Union than Andrew Johnson?" "Andy forgot our soldiers & sailors." "Andy forgot our wives and children." "It is a question for you to settle and you must do it at the ballot box at the approaching elections." "Fellow citizens: It is not for the purpose of making a speech that I appear now before you." (O, no!) "I have discharged all my duties and fulfilled all my pledges." ("Don't get mad, Andy.")	According to historian Elizabeth R. Varon, the "brilliantly acerbic" Nast contrasted "Johnson's self-image as a martyr to the Union with his postwar policies of appeasing the former rebels." Nast poses Johnson as a saint with a halo, "flanked by images of the suffering of Union soldiers and loyalist civilians during the war." "Don't get mad, Andy" was a memorable comment from someone in the crowd at the Cleveland speech.
	"This gang of office-holders, these bloodsuckers and cormorants had got fat on the country."	This comment was made during Johnson's Cincinnati speech at Kennard House. In seeking to use patronage jobs and the spoils system to his own benefit, Johnson "removed 1283 postmasters and made similar decapitations in the custom-houses and internal revenue offices". However many of these jobs had gone to injured war veterans during the Lincoln administration, while Johnson hired "men who opposed the war throughout", which caused its own set of political problems. In one case, according to a Delaware paper, a "good union man" was replaced as a railroad mail agent by Joseph Bush, said to be a former slave trader and Confederate sympathizer; the newspaper sarcastically commented, "This is the way President Johnson makes treason odious."
	("What does General Sheridan say?") ("New-Orleans.") "Trace it back to the radical Congress."	The crowds asked if Andrew Johnson had suppressed part of Gen. Philip Sheridan's report about the New Orleans massacre. (He had.) Johnson claimed that Congressional Republicans had instigated the civil disorder. According to historian Phifer, "The President's evidence was weak. He could not prove that Radical politicians had directly incited the riot. He could only show how well the event served their interests." According to historian Eric McKittrick, "He expressed no regret over the bloodshed but launched instead into a jumbled tirade against both the New Orleans radicals and radical members of Congress...it was as though he were saying that the radical agitation in Louisiana made the massacre inevitable. After what the police had done, and considering Sheridan’s messages, and in view of the rebel antecedents of the Louisiana civil authorities, Johnson’s belligerent defense of those authorities had the worst possible effect on Northern public opinion."
	"Bring a balm and oil from Gilead." "A balm that is healing in its character and pour it on the wound?"	A reference to balm of Gilead, mentioned in the Bible's Jeremiah 8 § Verse 22. Nast's Johnson (with a veto in his back pocket) tends to a wounded Confederate with "pardon oil" and "Southern rights" while a soldier of the U.S. Colored Troops (with a severed arm) cries for help alongside other Union wounded under a U.S. flag. Johnson had said to the crowd in Albany, New York, "Let me ask the soldier scarred in battle, or who has lost a limb, does he still desire to keep up the scenes of war and conflict? Does he want one portion of the country to be again arrayed against the other? Do we desire to reopen the arteries, and start the wound afresh, or do we desire to go to Gilead and bring the balm or oil in order to heal the wound, or do we desire again to see man lift his hand against the throat of his fellow?"
	"There are few men who have been abandoned by the people unless they have deserted them first." (That's so.)	As soon as Johnson left New York his speeches were met by increasingly hostile crowds; "the honeymoon was over; the swing around the circle headed toward trouble." Among many other incidents, crowds in Ashtabula and New Market, Ohio; Bloomington and Indianapolis, Indiana; and Pittsburgh, Pennsylvania entirely "refused a hearing" to the President.
	(This same mayor is running for governor.) (Our mare takes him through New York City.)	Johnson rides New York City "mare" John T. Hoffman past Delmonico's.
	"This was my object in presenting myself to you on this occasion and to tell you ' How do you do' and at the same time bid you 'good-by.'"	This caption is a quote from Johnson's Cleveland speech. Also in Cleveland, someone in the crowd called him a traitor; when Johnson mentioned Lincoln had put him on the ticket, someone yelled back "Unfortunately!"; and when Johnson told the crowd he was trying to figure out who was in the wrong, someone hollered, "It's you!"
	("Hang Jeff Davis.") "Then I would ask you, why not hang Thad Stevens and Wendell Philips."	Nast is quoting from an exchange between the crowd and Johnson at Cleveland. Among other things Unionists had spent the better part of the war singing "Oh we'll hang Jeff Davis from a sour apple tree." Rather than offering them any satisfaction, Johnson returned to a theme he'd hit for years: that abolitionists and secessionists were equally pernicious forces for disunion. (Ergo, Jefferson Davis, Thaddeus Stevens, and Wendell Phillips were all equally deserving of capital punishment for treason.) He had been making similar statements for years; for example on the Fourth of July 1862, he told a crowd at the Tennessee State Capitol in Nashville, "The Abolitionist and Secessionists on this point occupy the same stand: there is no difference between them. The Abolitionists, such as Wendell Phillips Garrison, and others, denounce President Lincoln as one worse than Jeff. Davis: From the hands of these incendiaries on both sides the people must rescue the Union. There is a great middle party between these two extremes."
		Johnson was constantly interrupted by hecklers during the trip, and more than once squabbled openly with private citizens in the crowd.
		Per Varon, "At each bottom corner were extracts from Johnson's wartime speeches, in which he had promised to mete out stern punishments to the leading rebels," often using a phrase he made famous: "Treason must be made odious."

== Reception ==
The Appleton Post of Wisconsin wrote, "Any Republican who wants something to smile at will find it abundantly in Harpers' Weekly for October 27. The large cartoon of Andy's Trip fills two pages, and gives stuff for study, laughter and execration; and the little vignette on the last page, representing Uncle Sam giving Andy a dose of extract of constitutional amendment, together with Andy's wry face thereat, cant fail to provoke boisterous laughter by its grotesque truth-telling." The Atchison Free Press of Kansas went even further: "By all means get Harper's Weekly for the 27th inst. It can be had at the news rooms, and is a valuable number. The illustration of Andy's Trip is worth a year's subscription, alone."

== See also ==
- "There Is a Balm in Gilead" – Traditional African American spiritual
- Amphitheatrum Johnsonianum – 1867 American artwork by Thomas Nast
- Southern Justice (political cartoon) – 1867 American artwork by Thomas Nast
- Time Works Wonders (political cartoon)
- Bibliography of Andrew Johnson
