= Amphitheatrum Johnsonianum =

1867 American artwork by Thomas Nast

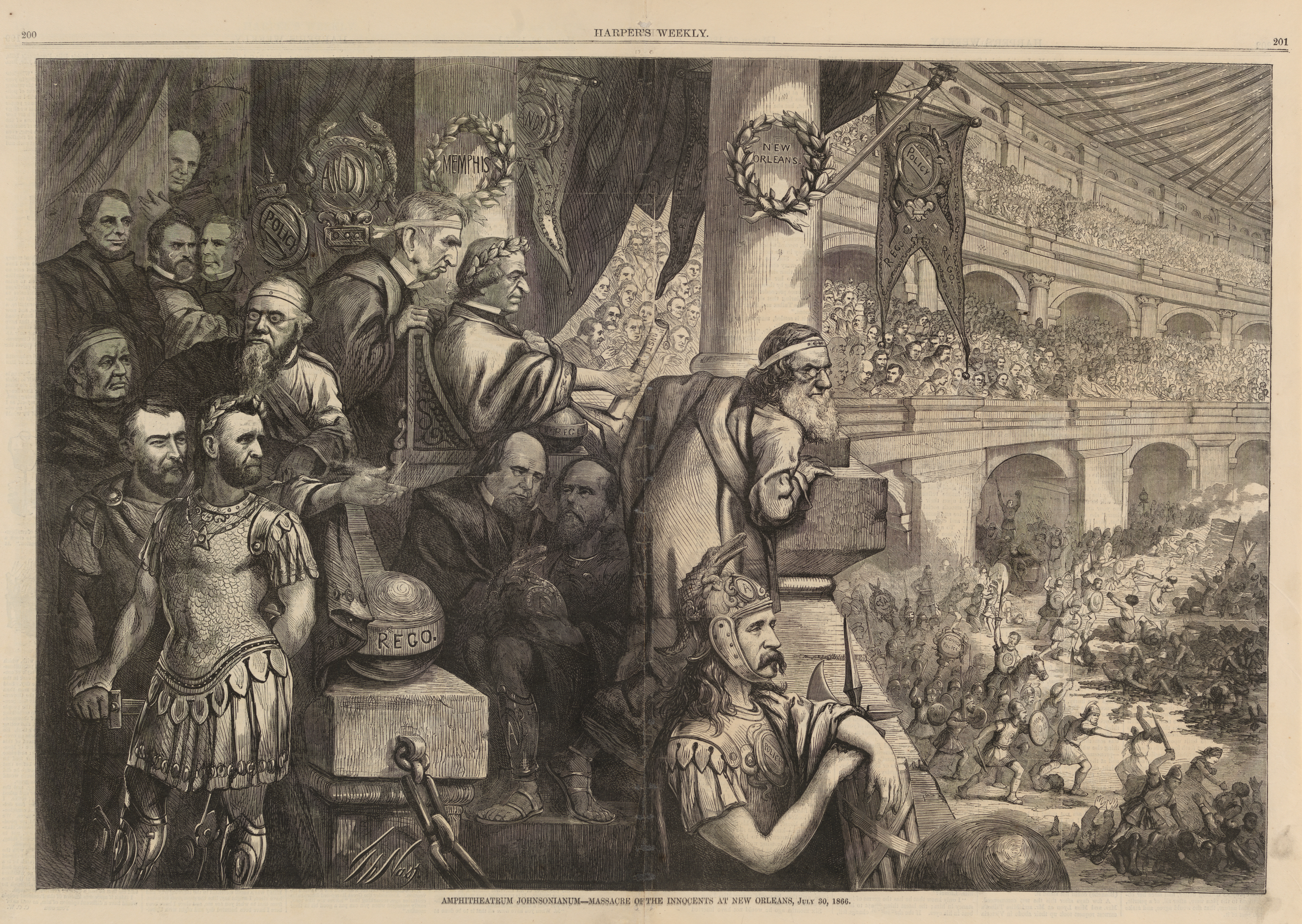
- Artist: Thomas Nast
- Year: 1867
- Medium: Woodcut
- Dimensions: 34.61 cm × 52 cm (13.625 in × 20.5 in)
- Website: Harper's Weekly (archive.org)

Amphitheatrum Johnsonianum – Massacre of the Innocents at New Orleans, July 30, 1866 (generally known simply as Amphitheatrum Johnsonianum) is a political cartoon by the 19th-century American artist Thomas Nast that depicts U.S. president Andrew Johnson as Emperor Nero at an ancient Roman arena, "figuratively fiddling with the...Constitution" while martyrs are slaughtered. The image depicts Johnson's alleged complicity in, and indifference to, the Memphis and New Orleans massacres of 1866. Amphitheatrum Johnsonianum was published in the March 30, 1867 issue of the illustrated newsmagazine Harper's Weekly in a double-page spread measuring 20 1/2 inches wide by 13 5/8 inches high.

The illustration was prepared in the latter part of 1866, but apparently the 27-year-old artist held it "until an official report on the massacre was released in 1867." Amphitheatrum is one of a series of images by Nast that castigate Johnson "for his failure to secure for the liberated slaves the privileges to which their newly won freedom entitled them. These cartoons are excellent examples of Nast's technique, showing the elaborate detail that characterized so much of his work." Amphitheatrum Johnsonianum has been called a "truly impressive work," Nast's most important work of 1867, and "one of the most important cartoons that Thomas Nast ever drew."

Nast's illustration reflected the public's disgust with Johnson's failure to keep promises that the Abraham Lincoln-led Union had made during the American Civil War. This outrage led directly to the passage of the monumental Fourteenth Amendment to the Constitution of the United States: "No single event in 1866 more clearly illustrated the states' continued failure to protect the constitutionally enumerated rights of American citizens than the New Orleans Riot of July 30, 1866. The riot left scores dead and wounded, many of them blacks who had fought for the Union in the Civil War. To Republicans, the violence in New Orleans exemplified everything that was wrong with President Johnson's approach to Reconstruction and starkly illustrated the need to require states to protect the rights of speech, press, assembly, and due process."

== Identifications ==
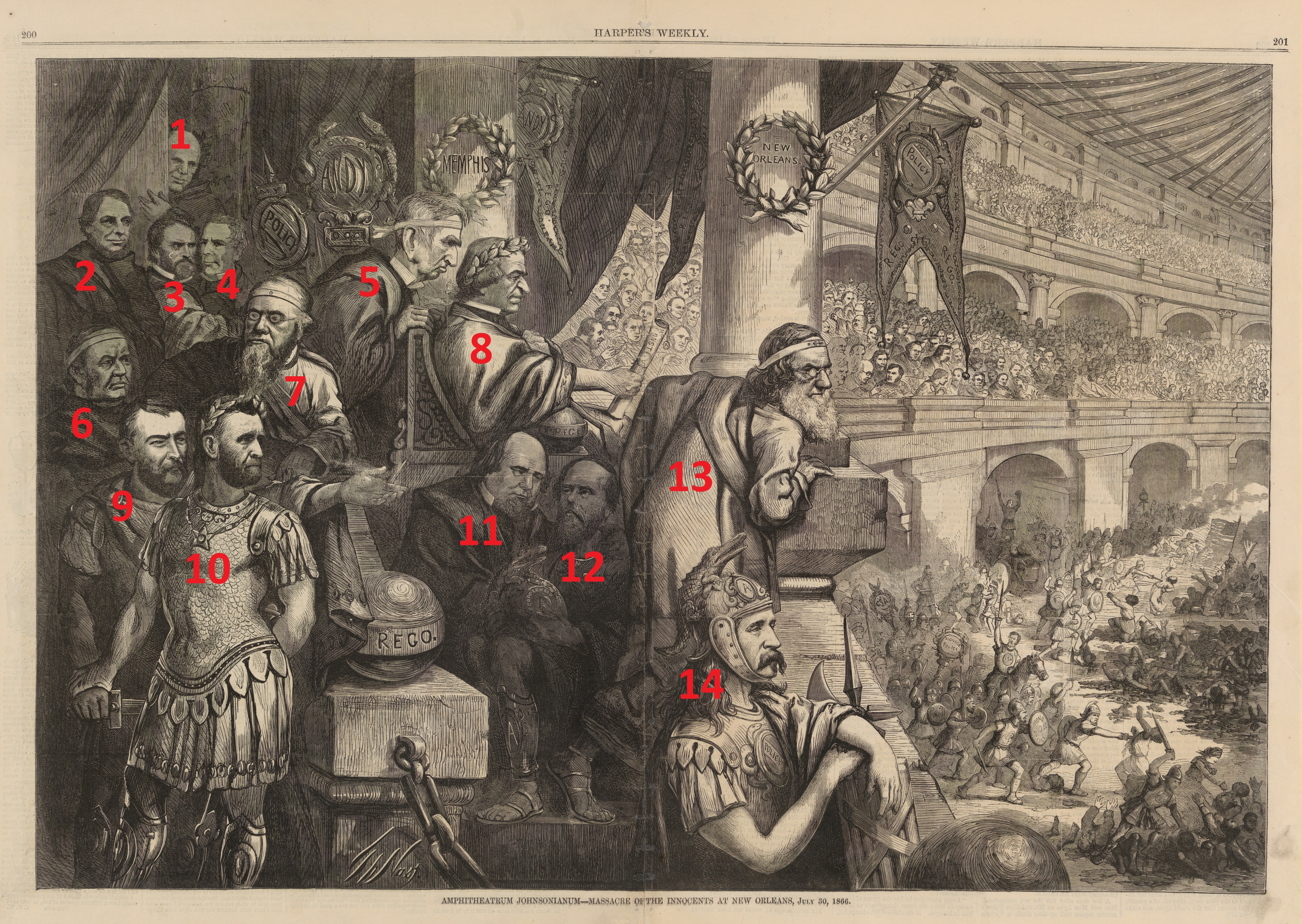
Amphitheatrum Johnsonianum: (1) Horatio Seymour, (2) Schuyler Colfax, (3) James R. Doolittle, (4) Alexander Randall, (5) William Seward, (6) Hugh McCulloch, (7) Edwin Stanton, (8) Andrew Johnson, (9) Philip Sheridan, (10) Ulysses S. Grant, (11) James Lawrence Orr, (12) Darius Couch, (13), Gideon Welles, (14) George Custer

1. SEYMOUR: Horatio Seymour lurks behind a curtain. Johnson's re-election prospects were always fairly dim, but there was also virtually no aspect of his presidency that ever improved rather than diminished his standing with the electorate. Former New York governor Seymour was ultimately chosen to be the Democratic nominee for the 1868 United States presidential election.
2. COLFAX: Schuyler Colfax of Indiana was Speaker of the U.S. House of Representatives in 1866 and would be elected vice president under Ulysses S. Grant, serving from 1869 to 1873.
3. DOOLITTLE: Shortly after the assassination of Lincoln, U.S. Senator James Doolittle of Wisconsin described Johnson to an audience in Racine, optimistically summarizing what was later perceived to be Johnson's characteristic arrogance, inflexibility, and compulsive obliviousness: "He is of bilious temperament...in whose character I should say the strongest feature of all is that of stern justice, mingled with a genuine hatred of all forms of aristocracy and oppression, and a patriotism so ardent that it amounts to a passion, almost a religion...Mr. Lincoln would have dealt with the rebels as an indulgent father deals with erring children. Mr. Johnson will deal with them more like a stern and incorruptible judge. Thus in a moment the sceptre of power has passed from a hand of flesh to a hand of iron."
4. RANDALL: Former governor of Wisconsin Alexander Randall was a strong Unionist and Lincolnite. Johnson appointed him Postmaster General following a cabinet shakeup in early 1866.
5. SEWARD: Secretary of State William H. Seward had been severely wounded by conspirators in the Lincoln assassination. Johnson liked Seward and kept him in the Cabinet, apparently in part because "As LaWanda and John Cox have shown, he never forgot the role Seward had played in securing him the vice presidential nomination, and he retained the New Yorker's services to the end of his administration." Seward had once suggested in a speech that his relationship with Johnson was like the dynamic between a prime minister and a hereditary monarch; thereafter Nast often depicted Seward as Johnson's "evil genius," the political mastermind managing the administration of malignant charlatan Johnson.
6. McCULLOCH: Hugh McCulloch served as the U.S. Treasury Secretary during Abraham Lincoln's brief second term and all of Andrew Johnson presidency. McCulloch's memoirs treat Johnson graciously, perhaps thus rationalizing his own association with him. One scholar has called McCulloch, at least historiographically, "the only real defender of Johnson." For his part, by the end of his term Johnson "had long distrusted McCulloch" and suspected him of political disloyalty.
7. STANTON: Secretary of War Edwin Stanton "ran the country single-handedly for the first days after the assassination, and no one looked to the newly sworn-in Johnson to make decisions. Johnson merely received delegations at the Treasury Building, seemed to mention the name Lincoln very seldom, and assured people he would punish treason." Stanton was a holdover from Lincoln's government and supported the Republican program for Reconstruction, which included holding Confederate leaders to account, promoting suffrage for emancipated male slaves, and suppressing white-supremacist actions in the south, all of which Johnson wanted to forgo. Unlike in earlier depictions of Johnson's cabinet, Nast "no longer doubts where Stanton stands: he turns away in disgust." By the time this cartoon was printed, in March 1867, President Johnson already wanted Secretary of War Stanton out of his Cabinet, "while Stanton was determined to stay on and keep the President from interfering with the military in the South. (Eighteen months later, Johnson acted and impeachment followed.)"
8. JOHNSON: Johnson announced his administration would not use federal power to protect newly emancipated African-American men, including former U.S. Colored Troops, and white Southern Unionists, who were gathering for a planned constitutional convention in New Orleans, which would have been dominated by freedmen and Republicans (Third Party System), as most defeated Confederates were still disenfranchised in 1866. Johnson's opponents felt that under color of "states' rights," he had thus signaled to a paramilitary of ex-Confederate white supremacists (in this case led by once and future New Orleans mayor John T. Monroe) that anti-black pogroms would be tolerated or even welcomed. As the Chicago Tribune put it in September 1866, "Mr. Johnson has been invited to visit New Orleans. By all means let him accept the invitation. As a victorious General has a desire in after years to visit the scene of his achievements, so, naturally, Andrew Johnson must feel a desire to visit the scene of the recent tragic illustration of his 'policy'—the bloody field of his victory over helpless and defenceless white men and unoffending negroes." According to political scientist Gautam Mukunda, "[Andrew Johnson's] combination of weakness, rigidity, and racism was exceptional even by 19th-century standards. The South was able to successfully win the peace after losing the war because Johnson inspired recalcitrant southerners to keep up the fight longer than a war-weary North was willing to maintain the pressure...Johnson's selection as vice president in 1864 was Lincoln's greatest mistake. Given the scale of Johnson's damage, Lincoln's assassination may be the greatest tragedy in American history."
9. SHERIDAN: Gen. Philip Sheridan was commander of the Fifth Military District (Louisiana and Texas) at the time of the massacre but was away from New Orleans leading an operation in Texas when it happened. He wrote that "with fire-arms, clubs, and knives, in a manner so unnecessary and atrocious as to compel me to say that it was murder...It was no riot. It was an absolute massacre by the police, which was not excelled in murderous cruelty by that of Fort Pillow. It was a murder which the Mayor and police of the city perpetrated without the shadow of a necessity." According to Johnson's most recent major biographer Hans Trefousse, "The president published the first half of the report but suppressed the second. The general's...apt description was too strong for Johnson, whose sympathies could hardly be in doubt."
10. GRANT: According to an analysis of the social psychology of Reconstruction by historian Mark Summers, "In the lower left-hand corner, General Philip Sheridan, later removed as district commander over New Orleans, draws the sword, presumably to slay the emperor and stop the massacre. General Ulysses S. Grant stays his friend's hand, but from his posture and Sheridan's expostulating look, the cartoonist makes clear that he only does so because the time to do summary justice has not yet come. Read literally, one might see the cartoon as an invitation to regicide." This is the beginning of a series of images by Nast that presented Grant as a national leader of heroic, almost mystical, stature. Grant ran for President in 1868 and won; Andrew Johnson refused to attend Grant's inauguration.
11. ORR: Crouching in the shadows, Governor James Orr of South Carolina bears a badge reading Copperhead while a grinning crocodile rests on his knee.
12. COUCH: Governor Darius Couch of Massachusetts sits "on the lap of the much larger" Orr. Orr and Couch had had "the featured roles at the pro-Johnson National Union political convention two weeks after the riot."
13. WELLES: Secretary of the Navy Gideon Welles "shared the president's conviction that suffrage was a matter for the states to decide."
14. CUSTER: George Armstrong Custer watches the slaughter "dispassionately." Custer was a Union Army war hero who had strong ties to leading Republican figures like Edwin Stanton, U.S. Senator Zachariah Chandler, and U.S. Representative John Bingham, but per historian Stephen Ambrose, Custer's personal politics favored the views of the "southern–Andrew Johnson" contingent, and he alienated Republican allies with his "gloomy predictions about the future of blacks". According to one Pennsylvania newspaper in August 1866, "Gen. Custer is a rampant Johnson man now. In March last he testified under oath that the opposition of the rebels 'to the government and loyalty is as openly visible and as plainly manifest now as it was in 1861.' But his volunteer commission had expired, and he became a convert to 'my policy,' attended the Philadelphia Convention from whence he reported at Washington, and was at once commissioned a Lieutenant Colonel in the regular army. Custer is no fool if he is a knave".

The action in Nast's arena is essentially documentary, drawn from reports made by government investigators about the "pre-meditated act of ex-Rebels intent on destroying the native Republican movement in Louisiana." The brutality is intentionally remote from the high-status individuals in the foreground but Nast was careful to include clearly recognizable figures within the stands and, down on the field, recognizable scenes drawn from news reports. For example, "the very small figure of Mayor John T. Monroe is depicted on horseback and has the initials CSA (Confederate States of America) on his breastplate. His Roman soldiers are labeled the Monroe Police. The mayor had recruited former Confederate soldiers and white supremacists to serve in the reconstituted civilian police force. Nast drew unarmed Black civilians—both men and women—as Christian martyrs pleading for their lives as they were hacked to pieces."

Additional detail
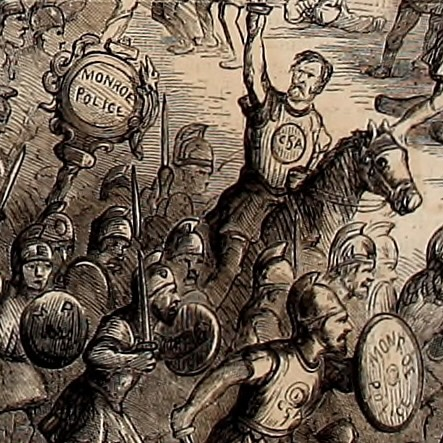
John T. Monroe's breastplate reads CSA; he leads men with shields reading Monroe Police

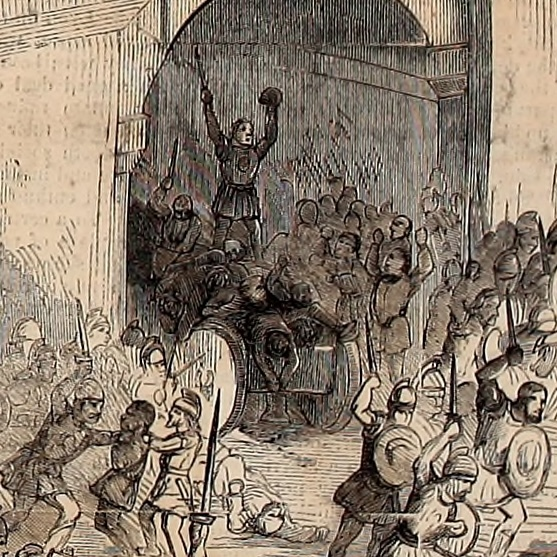
Bodies of the dead piled onto a tumbrel (Note: This is a reference to news reports that "After the slaughter had measurably ceased, carts, wagons and drays driven through the streets gathered the dead, the dying and the wounded in 'promiscuous loads,' a policeman in some cases riding in the wagon seated upon the living men beneath him.")

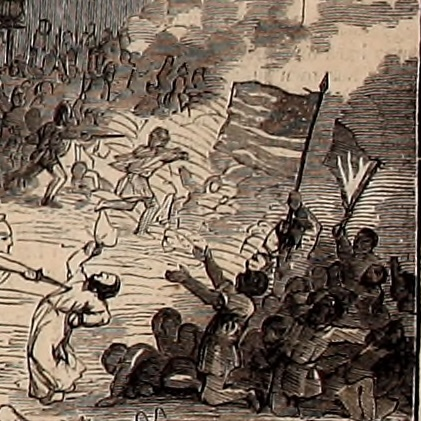
To the left, Jesus Christ is stabbed, possibly a reference to the assassination of the Rev. Mr. Jotham Horton, who was shot multiple times and then beaten to death by New Orleans cops

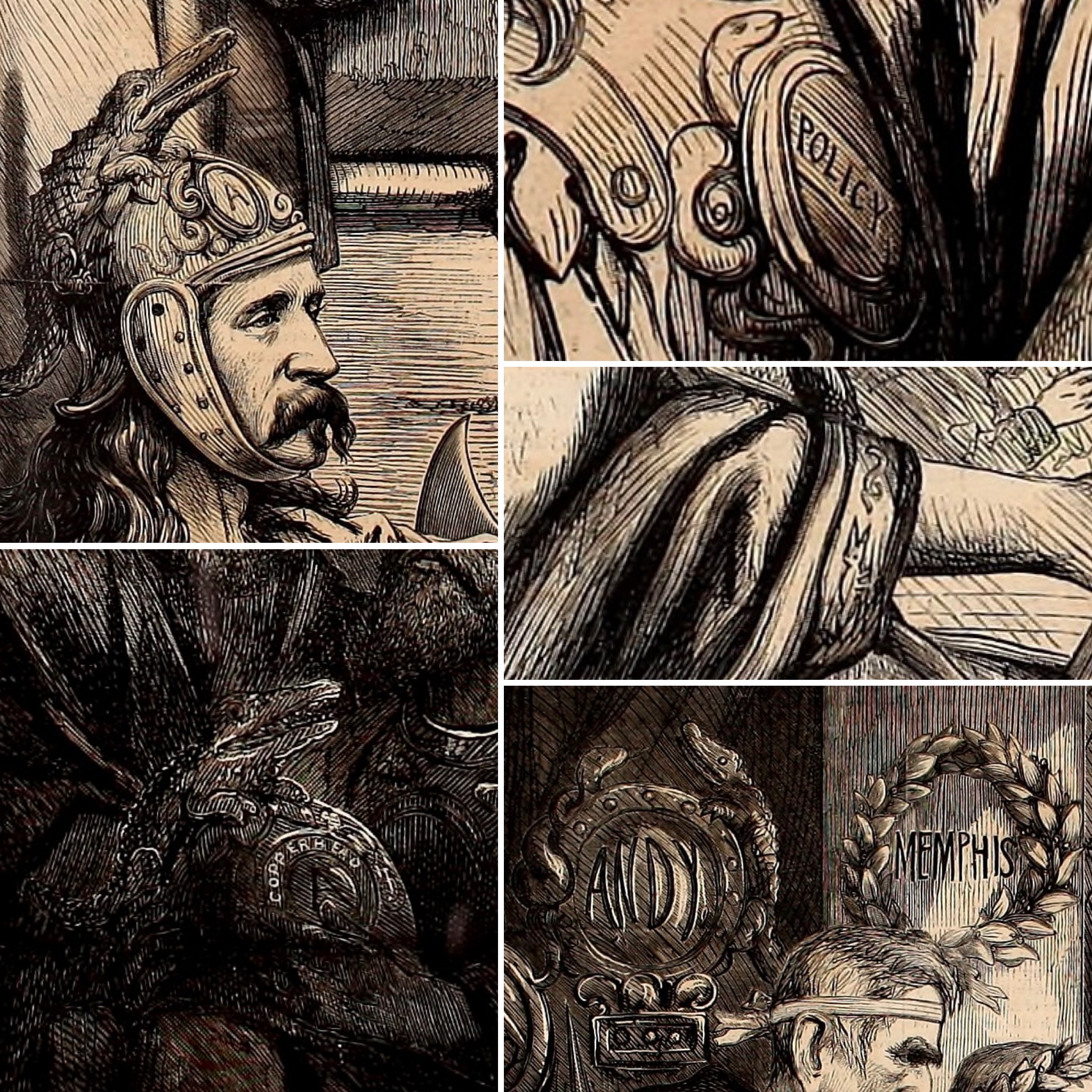
Reptilian details of Amphitheatrum Johnsonianum (Note: A crocodile stands in for the crest on Custer's Roman helmet, another one rests on Orr's knee (besides a badge that reads Copperhead), a snake coils on Custer's breastplate, crocodile and snake embroidery appear on the hem of Johnson's toga, and a snake and a crocodile replace a laurel wreath around the name Andy.)

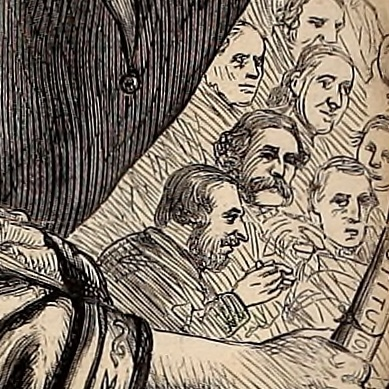
In the stands closest to Emperor Andy are the Copperheads: Manton Marble, John Hoffman, and Fernando Wood

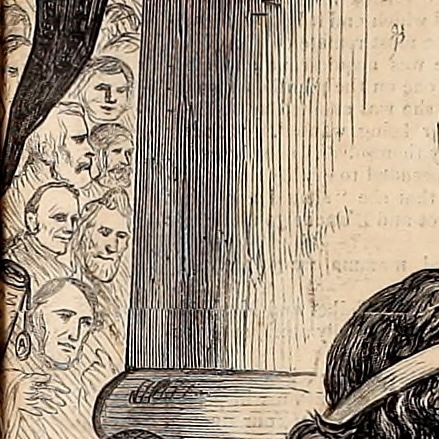
Believed to be more Copperheads, at least one positively identified as Clement Vallandigham

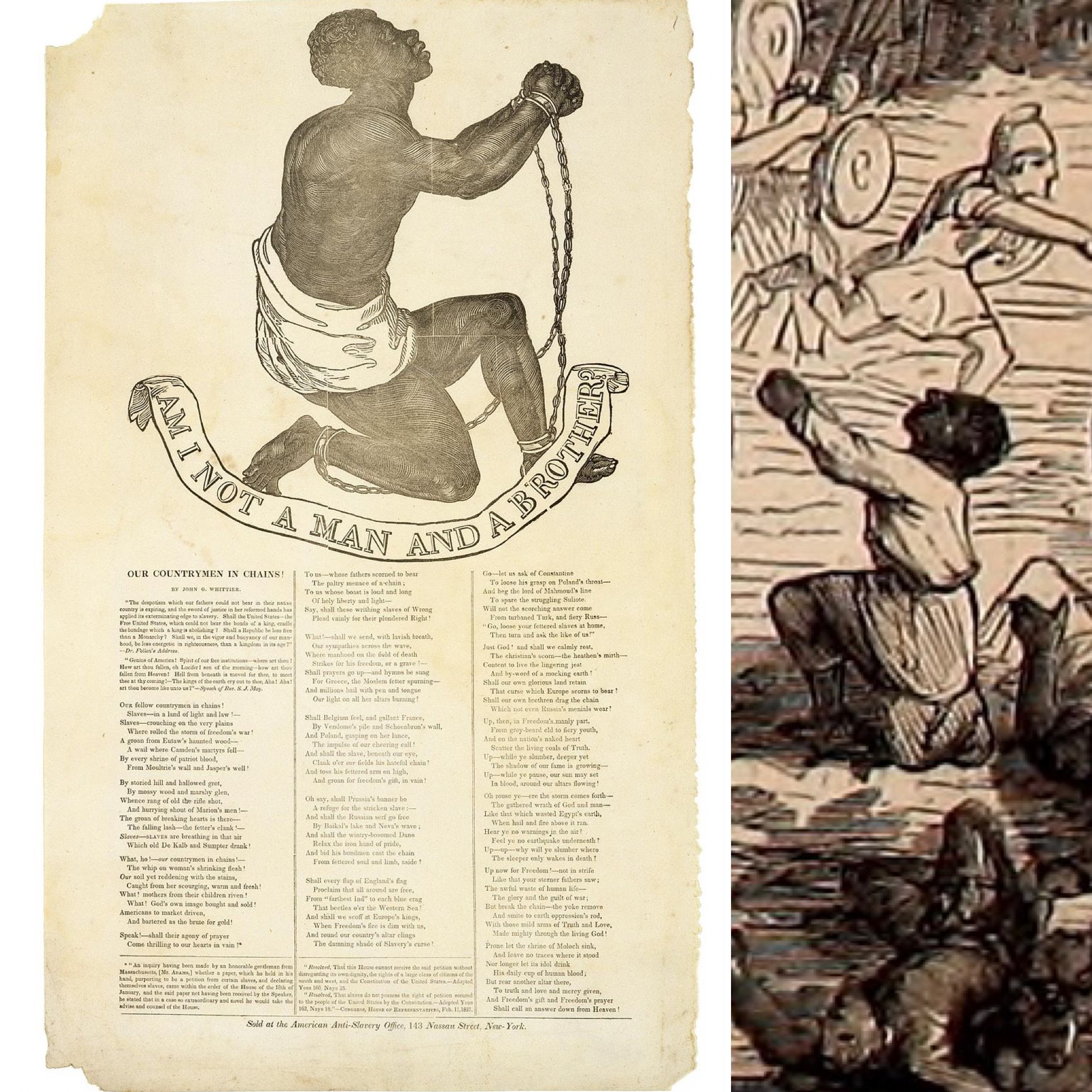
Mirroring a famous abolitionist image that was usually captioned "Am I not a man and a brother?", a New Orleans freedman begs for his life. (Note: This pose reflects reports from the scene: "Several times during the massacre the Negroes tried to surrender, but their white flags were treated with contempt...police reportedly answered: 'We don't want any prisoners; you have all got to die.'...Many Negroes who approached individual policemen, begging to be arrested, were shot down in cold blood.")

== Image ==
=== Artist ===
According to the historian Morton Keller

There is a notable correlation between the quality of Nast's drawings and the force of the conviction that lies behind them. When he is engaged in causes about which he deeply cares, then we see the 'stark, focused style' of his artistic peak.

In 1914, J. Henry Harper said

His views were his own rather than those of any particular party or faction...Nast was an ardent student of politics, and one reason for his great success was that he was always thoroughly conversant with a situation before he attempted to attack it...In disposition he was urbane and sociable, but never the courtier. If so inclined, he could be extremely sarcastic and most scathing in his comments; in fact, his work ran much in the same lines—witty, comical, and satirical, or powerfully severe and relentless.

Gary Land said

Thomas Nast was not born in America, nor did he die here. While he lived though, he embodied the American Dream. A foreigner who made his fame and his home here, he fought to defend America's values and to defend the possibility of the Dream against predators.

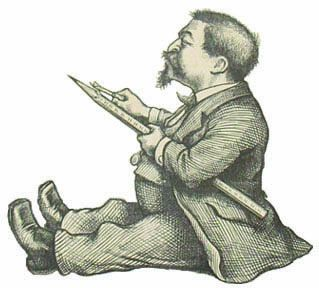
Thomas Nast self-portrait, published 1876

=== Aesthetics ===
The Amphitheatrum Johnsonianum image is an exemplar of Nast's "crisp linear technique, sharp tonal contrasts and knack for monumental design." Nast often used a multi-panel format that allowed him to present various scenarios, portraits, and tableaux side-by-side (and to integrate quotes from news accounts into the framework between the images), but "here...Nast uses only one picture." The image, which has a strong overall visual cohesion, is nonetheless an assemblage of "striking and unmistakable" portraits.

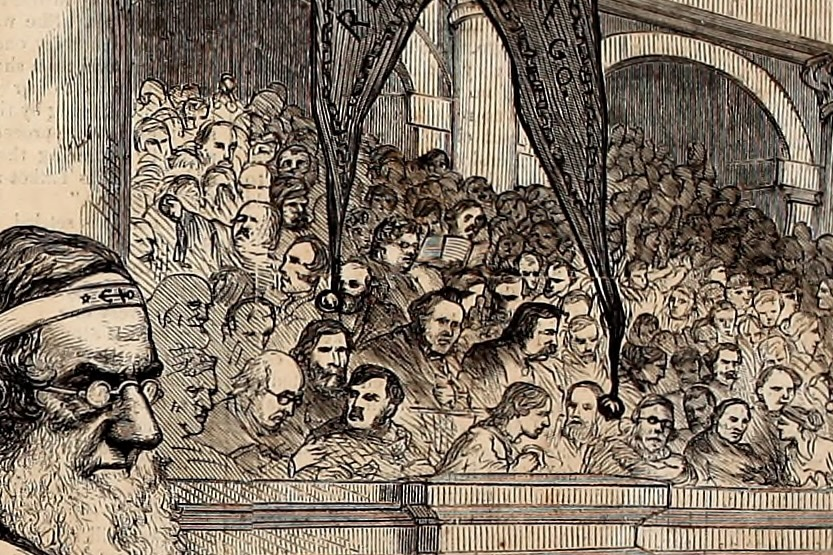
In the distance, social-justice warriors of the day—including Horace Greeley, Benjamin Butler, Wendell Phillips, and Anna Elizabeth Dickinson—look on in dismay

According to Albert Bigelow Paine writing in 1904, these careful depictions were "always the case in the work of Nast. Even among the concourse of little figures in the crowded Coliseum galleries, we may today pick out the familiar faces of history. Nast almost never thought it necessary to label his characters, as is the custom now. Johnson was always Johnson, whatever the guise. Seward, who had kept his place in the Cabinet, and lost prestige thereby, was usually prominent and never could be mistaken." The picture extended a previously established characterization of Johnson as an unelected tyrant out of concord with the American people.

Nast sometimes set his cartoons on the stage, making manifest their theatricality: "He was partial to proscenium arches as an artistic device, and occasionally created a grand spectacle as in a coliseum." In the early 1970s, Nast's grandson Thomas Nast St. Hill wrote:

I remember seeing my grandfather at work in his home studio. I recall particularly the three-foot-high bronze statue The Gladiator above his roll-top desk and his pet mockingbird in a cage close by. As I now realize, the statue of the gladiator was symbolic, in that it represented one who, like Thomas Nast himself, engaged in fierce combat or controversy.

Amphitheatrum is one of Nast's works that is influenced by "the French academic, painters who treated history with dramatic realism...A frustrated history painter, Nast incorporated and burlesqued the work of well-known rivals, thus guaranteeing himself an aura of 'academic' respectability. This tension with 'high' art is often experienced in Nast's cartoons even when the original source remains unknown and is expressed as part of the general effect."

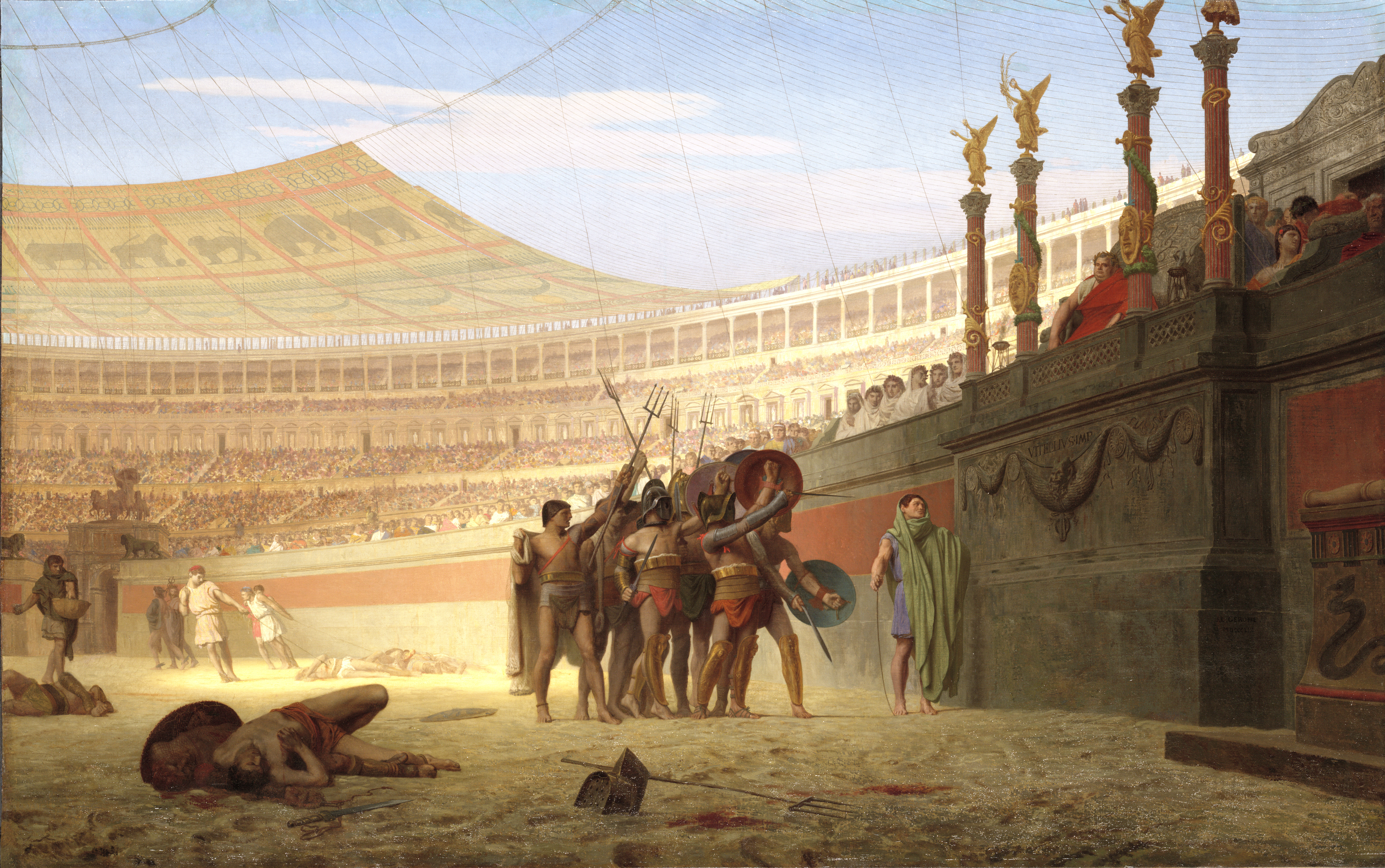
Ave Caesar Morituri te Salutant by Jean-Léon Gérôme

One source suggests Nast's image was specifically inspired by an 1859 painting by Jean-Léon Gérôme called Ave Caesar Morituri te Salutant (transl. Hail Caesar! We who are about to die salute you!), which was clearly the visual inspiration for Nast's Tammany Tiger four years later. The Gérôme painting, currently in the collection of the Yale University Art Gallery, has a different composition and perspective than Johnsonianum, but much the same theme: a self-indulgent monarch looks on, disinterested, as the bodies of recently slain gladiators are dragged off the field and the victorious (for today) celebrate in a knot in the foreground, a position that ironically highlights their isolation from the politically influential but passive observers who sit above them in the stadium.

=== Politics ===
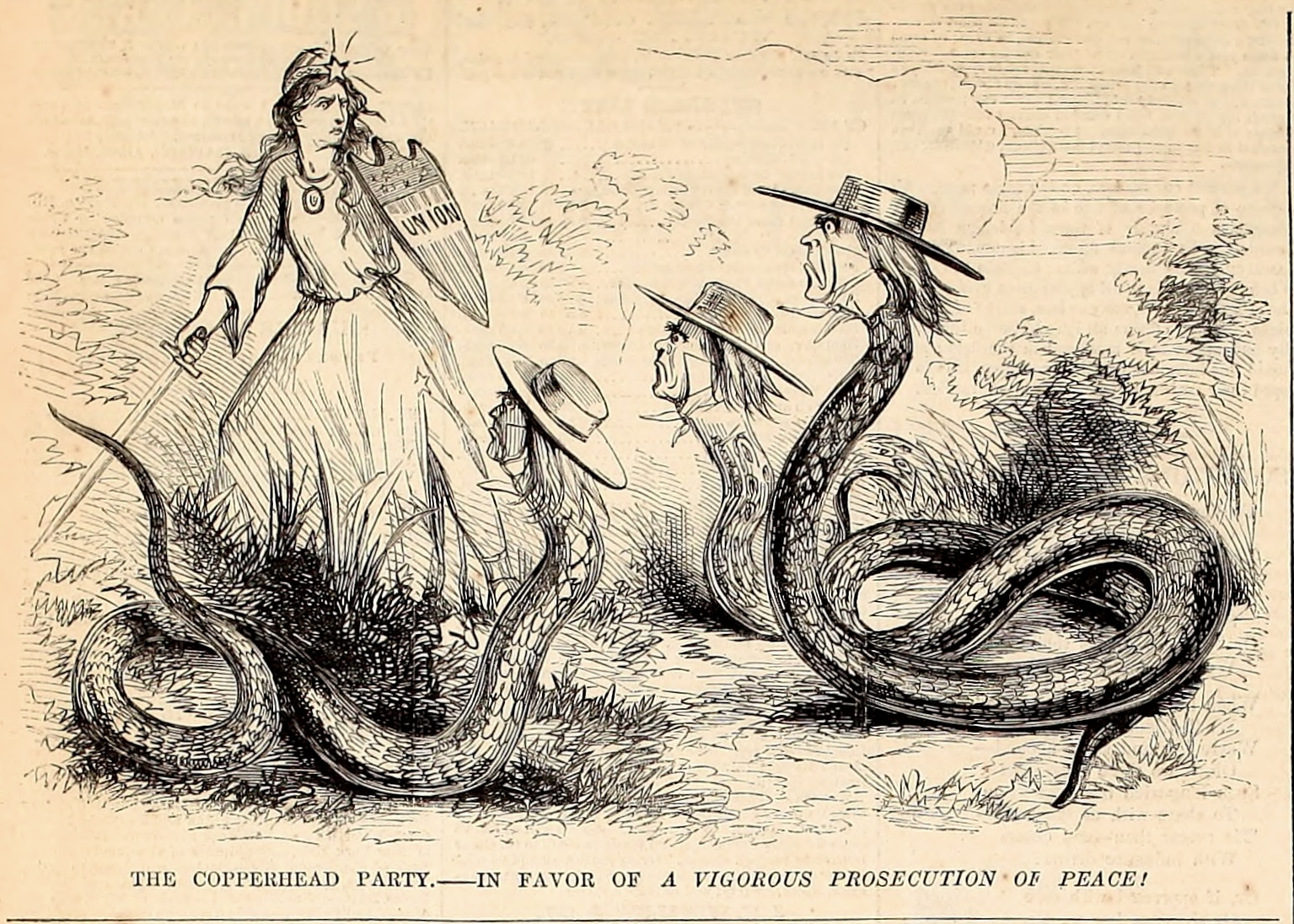
"The Copperhead Party—in Favor of a Vigorous Prosecution of Peace!" (Thomas Nast, Harper's Weekly, February 28, 1863)

In almost every stump speech Andrew Johnson made in his 30-year political career, he claimed to be a plebeian, a commoner, opposed to the patrician enslavers of the planter class. For decades Johnson had relentlessly assailed plantation owners as source and sink of all that ailed the antebellum South, but in the end, writes historian Annette Gordon-Reed, "Johnson's supposed hatred for the southern aristocracy turned out to have been just so much talk when compared to his determination to maintain the South and the country as a 'white man's government.'"

I am a-goin' for to tell you here to-day; yes, I'm a'goin' for to tell you all, that I'm a plebeian! I glory in it; I am a plebeian! The people, yes the people of the United States have made me what I am; and I am a-goin' for to tell you here to-day–yes, to-day, in this place–that the people are everything. Mr. Seward, Mr. Stanton, and you too, Mr. [turning to Secretary Forney]—What is the name of the Secretary of the Navy?

— Andrew Johnson, drunk vice-presidential inaugural address, March 4, 1865

With Johnsonianum, Nast assails what he perceives to be the dishonesty and hypocrisy of Johnson's plebeian pose, revealing him instead as imperator, in whose name the carnage is done, and anathema to "we the people." The Nero metaphor may first have been used by Johnson's ancient Tennessee frienemy, the storied newspaper editor and politician Parson Brownlow. Brownlow's was one of many voices accusing Johnson of—at minimum—negligence in the matter of New Orleans. "I have long been familiar with the history and deeds of Andrew Jackson, the hero of New Orleans," said Brownlow, while traveling to a convention with a delegation from his state, "and I wanted to hear from Andrew Johnson, the Nero of New Orleans."

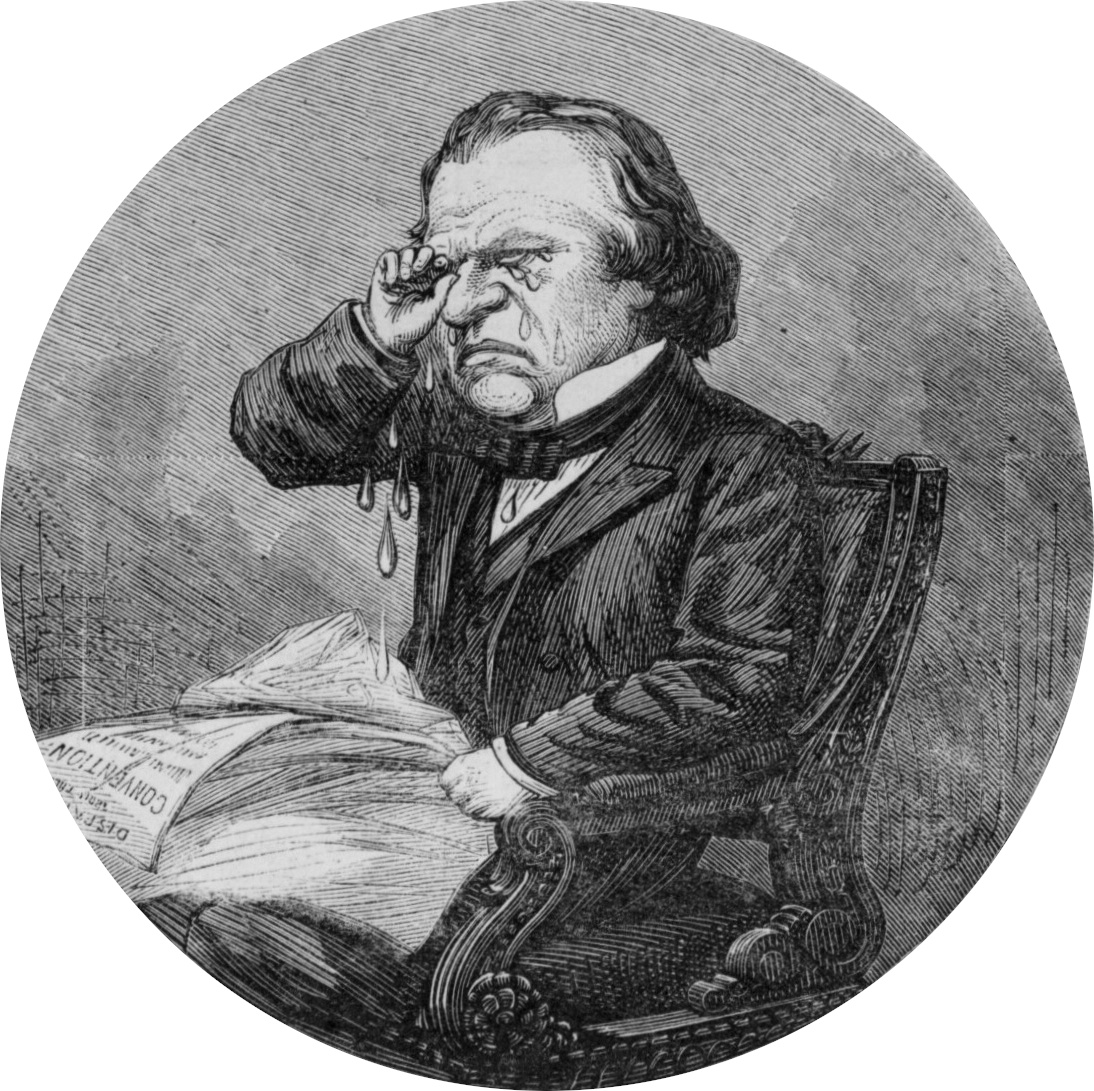
"I could not finish reading the dispatch for my own feelings overcame me." —Andrew Johnson (Thomas Nast, The Tearful Convention, September 29, 1866)

There are a number of snakes and crocodilians present in the imperial box in Amphitheatrum Johnsonianum. The crocodilians are meant to be suggestive of crocodile tears, the Nile crocodiles of Biblical Egypt, and American crocodiles and alligators of southern swamps and bayous, these last being a creature of some dread in American folklore. The snakes are Eastern copperheads, a kind of pit viper native to the woods and wetlands of the Southern United States, known for both its effective camouflage and its dangerous venom, and here representative of politicians who were disparagingly called Copperheads because they were perceived to be Confederate sympathizers of the Democratic Party (Third Party System) elected from Union states.

These animals first appeared in a Nast cartoon about the 1866 National Union Convention, which was organized to build support for Johnson and his policies ahead of the 1866 United States elections. Andrew Johnson claimed, "I could not finish reading the dispatch for my own feelings overcame me," about reports that Governor Darius Couch of Massachusetts (representing Billy Yank) and Governor James Orr of South Carolina (representing Johnny Reb) had entered the convention hall arm-in-arm. The Northern press roasted Johnson for his claim of tearfulness, incensed that he had never before evinced a sympathetic emotion, not least at happenings like 400,000 Union casualties in the war, the assassination of Lincoln, or the massacre of 3rd Regiment Heavy Artillery U.S. Colored Troops and dozens of civilians in Memphis in May 1866. Nast thought Johnson was being disingenuous, at best, and his cartoon of the convention included an image of the president comically crying crocodile tears within a visual framework bedecked with crocodiles, an image he carried forward into his imagined American coliseum.

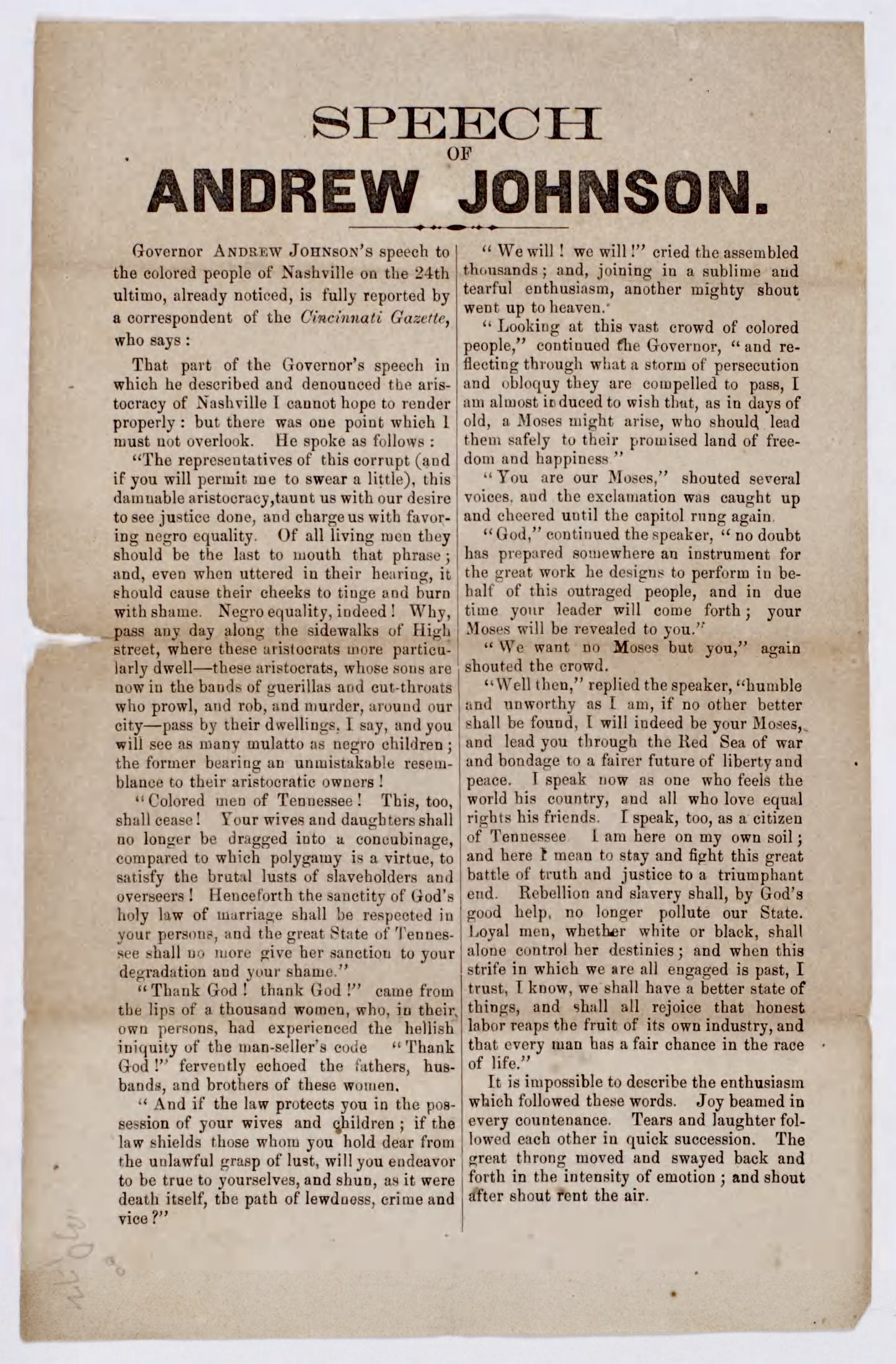
The Library Company of Philadelphia holds this broadside of select passages from Johnson's "Moses speech" with editorial commentary

Moreover, while a candidate for vice president on Lincoln's National Union Party ticket in 1864, Andrew Johnson had made a stirring and famous address in Nashville that came to be known as the Moses speech for its pledges on civil rights and racial progress. Once elevated to power on the authority of John Wilkes Booth and the presidential line of succession, Johnson turned almost immediately away from any such campaign promises, leading newspaper writers to Nile River metaphors such as, "There is good reason to believe, that when Miss Columbia, in imitation of Miss Pharaoh, fished among the bulrushes and slimy waters of Southern plebeianism for a little Moses, she slung out a young crocodile instead. He is a crocodile by nature, although he calls himself Moses. He craunches and gulps down whatever stands in his way, without any signs of mercy, yet is always prepared to shed tears to order."

== Reception ==
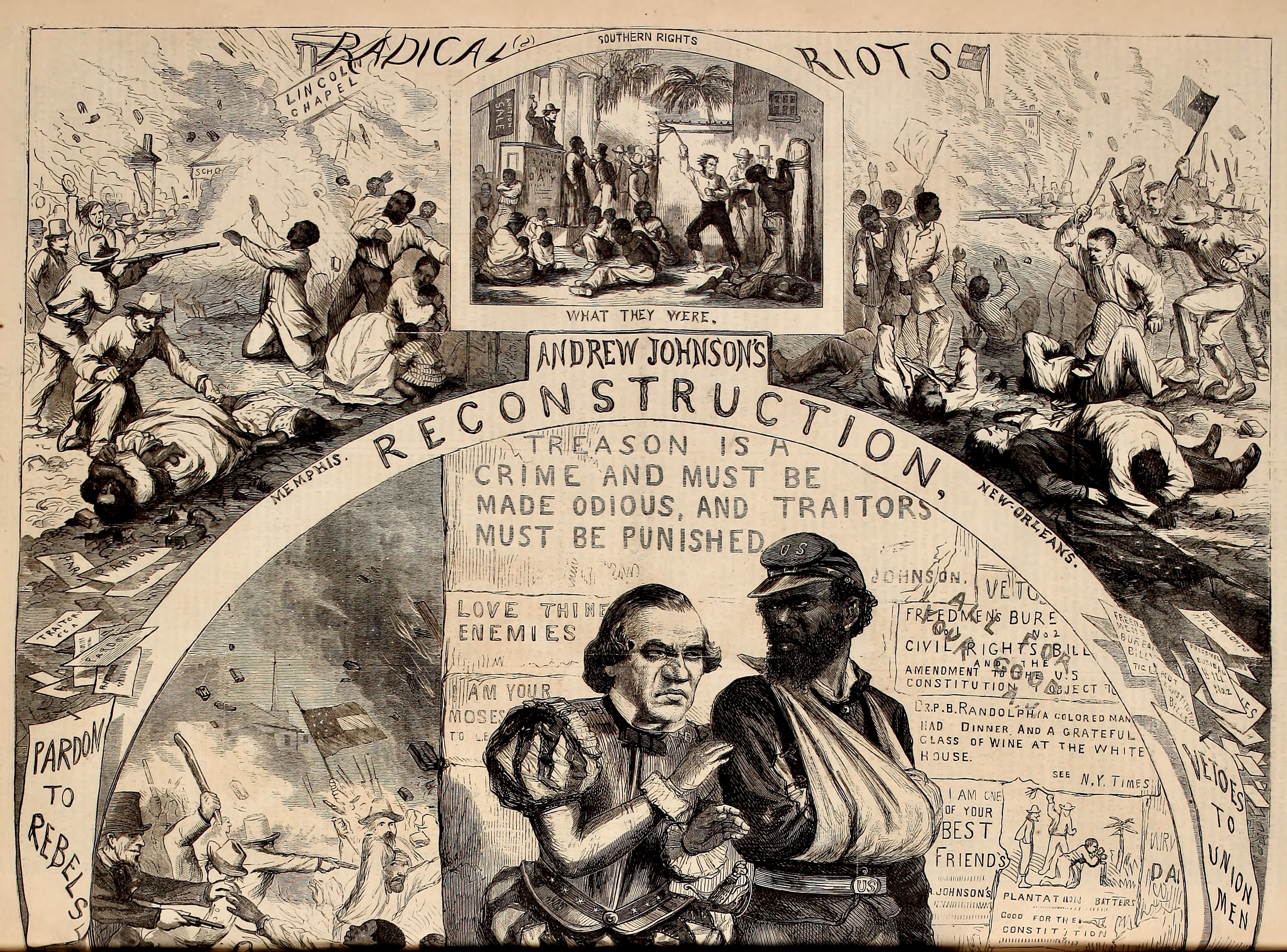
The killings in Memphis and New Orleans featured prominently in Andrew Johnson's Reconstruction, which depicted Johnson as Iago to the freedman's Othello, and was a predecessor image to Amphitheatrum Johnsonianum (Harper's Weekly, September 1, 1866)

Responses to Nast's political artwork were divided along party lines in his time and for many decades thereafter. Amongst the Southern whites, Nast's reputation was never good: "Even prior to Reconstruction, Nast and Harper's had pilloried the South during the Civil War to such an extent that in New Orleans Harper's was identified as a form of obscene literature." Whereas in the North, Nast was deemed a sage. Charles Sumner of Massachusetts referenced the illustration in a speech on the floor of the United States Senate on March 28, 1867:

The victims are black, and their sacrifice, as gladiators, makes a "Roman holiday" (Note: The phrase "Roman holiday" is now known almost entirely in association with the charm of the 1953 Hepburn-Peck film but was originally suggestive of the gladiator spectacles of ancient Rome and described "an occasion on which enjoyment or profit is derived from the suffering or discomfiture of others.") now red. Beneath the picture is written, "Amphitheatrum Johnsonianum—Massacre of the Innocents at New Orleans, July 30, 1866." This inscription tells the terrible story...But this is only a single scene in one place. Wherever in the Rebel States there is a truly loyal citizen, loving the Union, there is a victim who may be called to suffer at any moment from the distempered spirit which now rules. I speak according to the evidence. This whole country is an "Amphitheatrum Johnsonianum," where the victims are counted by the thousand. To my mind, there is no duty more urgent than to guard against this despot, and be ready to throw the shield of Congress over loyal citizens whom he delivers to sacrifice.

The Congressional shield arguably came in the form of the Fourteenth Amendment, Fifteenth Amendment, Enforcement Acts, and Ku Klux Klan Act.

The ebb and flow of Andrew Johnson's historical reputation has often determined the critique of pieces like Amphitheatrum. In particular, during the nadir of American race relations, "when Reconstruction racial and economic policies were viewed with particular disfavor, Johnson emerged the valiant hero who had bravely withstood the evil Radicals," and Nast was viewed as a useful idiot. For example, the author of A History of American Graphic Humor (1938) argued, "The widespread propaganda to the effect that Johnson was betraying the principles and program of Lincoln inflamed many much older men than the youthful Nast...All the fierce invective and scathing ridicule then at his command were launched at the unfortunate Johnson...Yet Nast quite deliberately and with honest conviction did his share in the vilification of the President. He showed him as a would-be king aiming at absolute power, as a drunken sot, and as a Roman tyrant." Similarly, a 1957 analysis of Nast as crusader artist asserted that Amphitheatrum Johnsonianum was Nast's "most ambitious assault" on Johnson's Presidential Reconstruction but that Nast helped create false impressions of Johnson that "took two generations to correct." Then, beginning in the 1960s, "Once black equality and the injustice of racial discrimination became the prevailing belief, Johnson's historical reputation had no place to go but down." With Johnson's decline came a commensurate ascendance in the evaluation of Nast's Reconstruction-era art, which in 1965 was called "the best record we have of that era of American public life a century ago...Nast spoke to, and for, a vast number of Americans who were ready to believe that the good society lay close at hand...He had a strong sense of the United States as a nation of diverse peoples, welded together by self-government...Not until our own time could Nast's aspirations and his disappointments regain their original evocative power."

== See also ==
- Andy's Trip – published October 27, 1866
- Southern Justice (political cartoon) – published March 23, 1867
- Freedmen massacres
- Andrew Johnson and slavery
- Historical reputation of Ulysses S. Grant
- Civil rights movement (1865–1896)
- Ave Imperator, morituri te salutant
- Persecution of Christians in the Roman Empire
- Great Fire of Rome
