= Oh we'll hang Jeff Davis from a sour apple tree =

Politically significant American song lyric

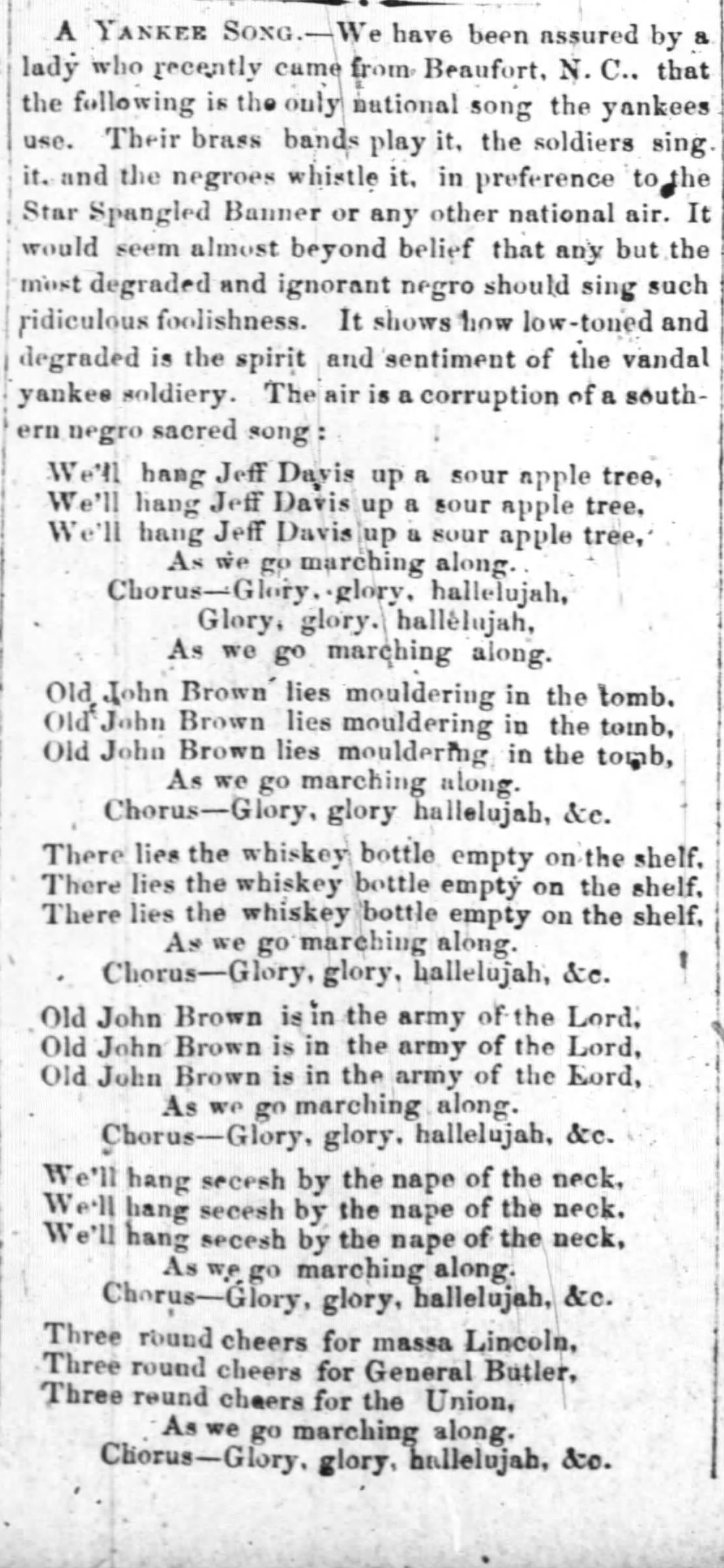
"A Yankee Song" (The Charlotte Democrat, Charlotte, N.C., December 23, 1862)

"Oh we'll hang Jeff Davis from a sour apple tree" (and similar) is a variant of the American folk song "John Brown's Body" that was sung by the United States military, Unionist civilians, and freedmen during and after the American Civil War. The phrase and associated imagery became relevant to the post-war legal issues surrounding the potential prosecution of former Confederate politicians and officers; the lyric was sometimes referenced in political cartoons and artworks of the time, and in political debates continuing well into the post-Reconstruction era.

== History ==
Jeff Davis and the sour apple tree appear in print as early as August 1861. In 1880, a U.S. Army veteran claimed credit for first singing the lyric in spring 1862 in Virginia, having taken inspiration from a prior song about a "sick monkey in a sour apple tree." In 1947 a survivor of American slavery named Perry Vaughn recalled, "I fought in Abe Lincoln's army and played the bass horn in the Army band. I can still remember, like it was yesterday, playing 'We'll Hang Jeff Davis on a Sour Apple Tree.'"

A less bloodthirsty and more obscene variant was "We'll feed Jeff Davis sour apples 'til he gets the diarhee."

Richard Wright's 1938 novella Big Boy Leaves Home references a white-supremacist variant: "We'll hang ever nigger t a sour apple tree".

Jefferson Davis, the first and only president of the Confederate States of America, died of natural causes in 1889.

== Gallery ==
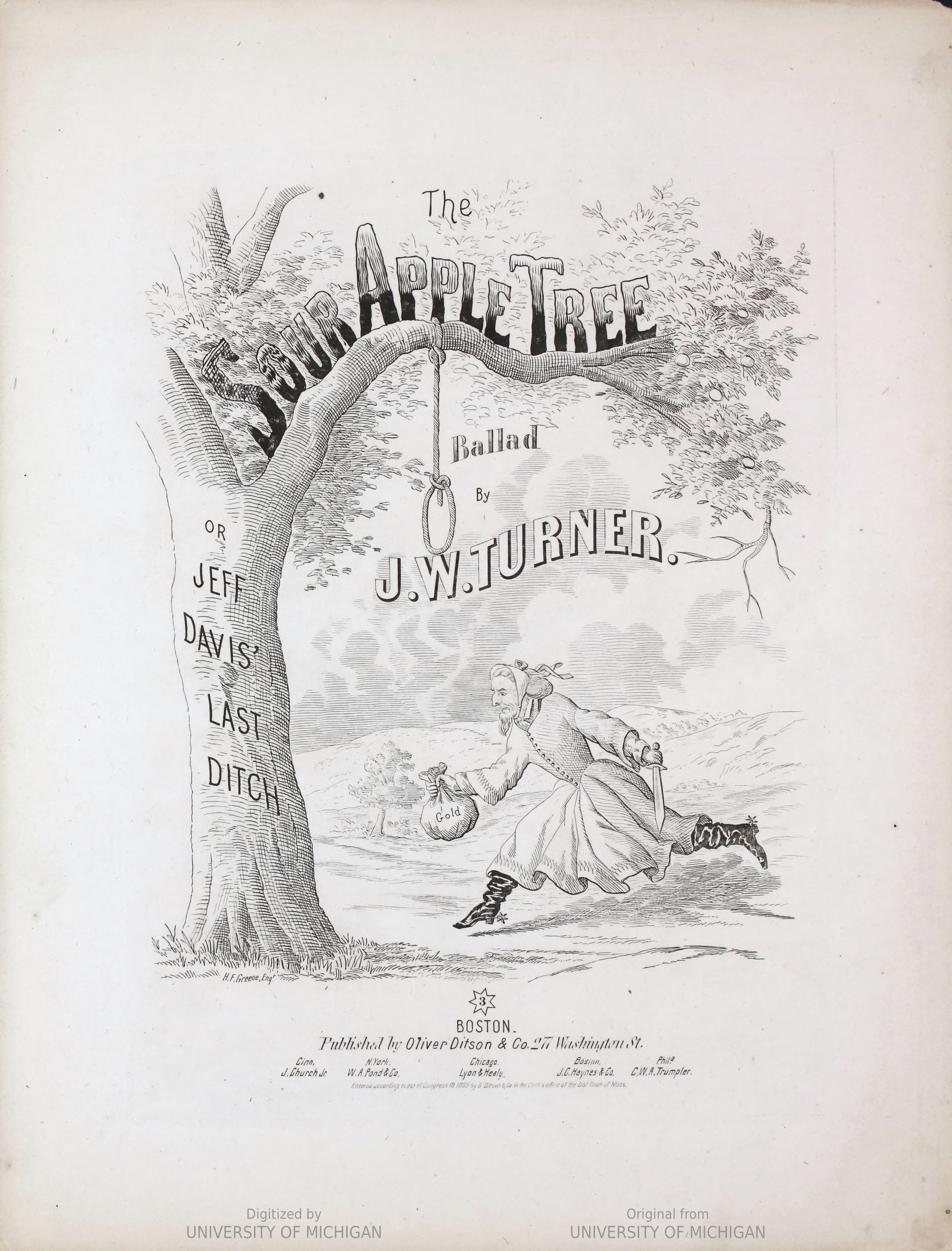
Cover for a spin-off "The Sour Apple Tree, or Jeff Davis' Last Ditch" depicts Davis in a dress, a common image after the end of the war, as when he was captured he was reportedly wearing a woman's cloak (Edison Collection of American Sheet Music at University of Michigan via HathiTrust)

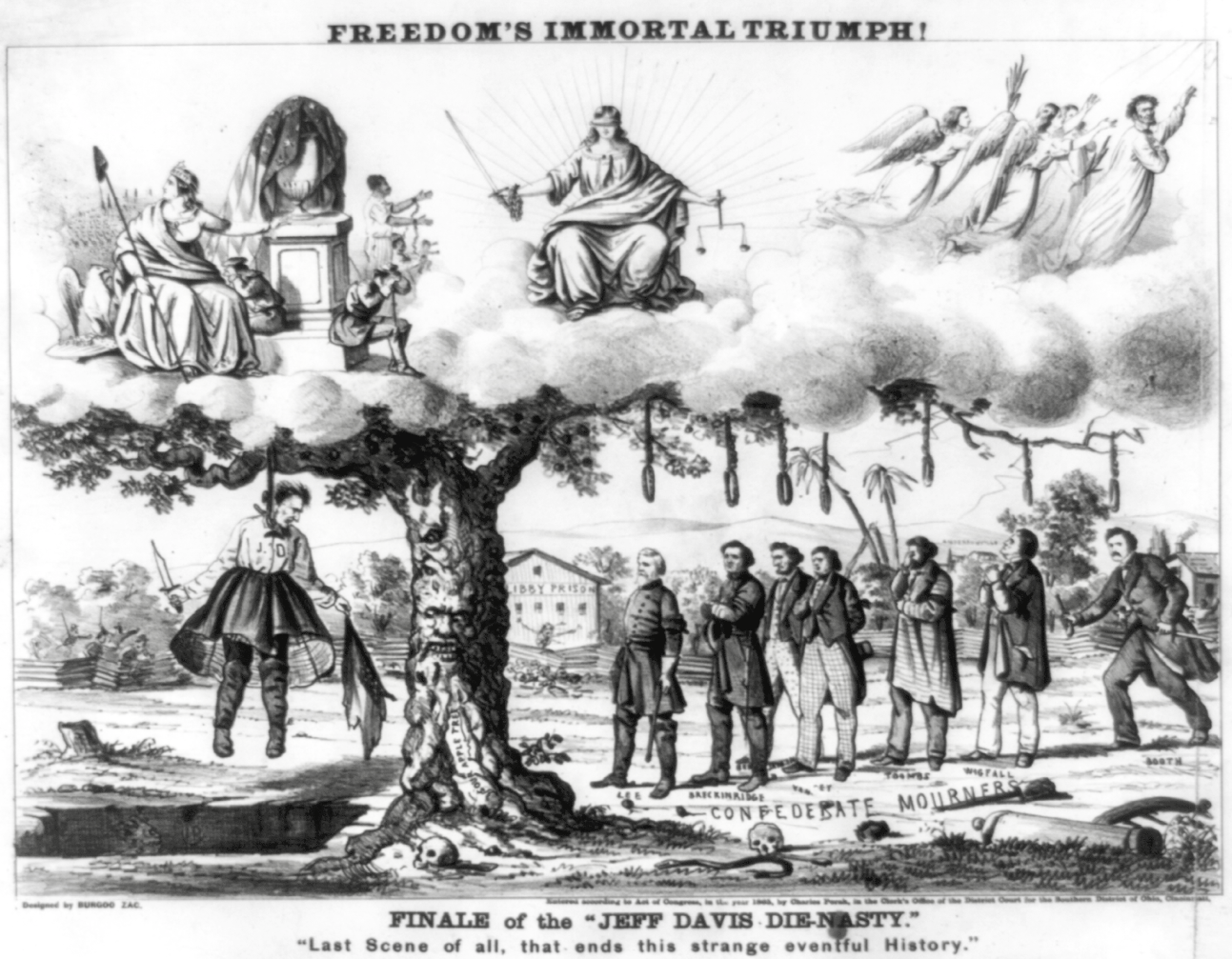
This 1865 American political cartoon entitled "Freedom's Immortal Triumph" featured the imagery from the song (Library of Congress cph.3b35188)

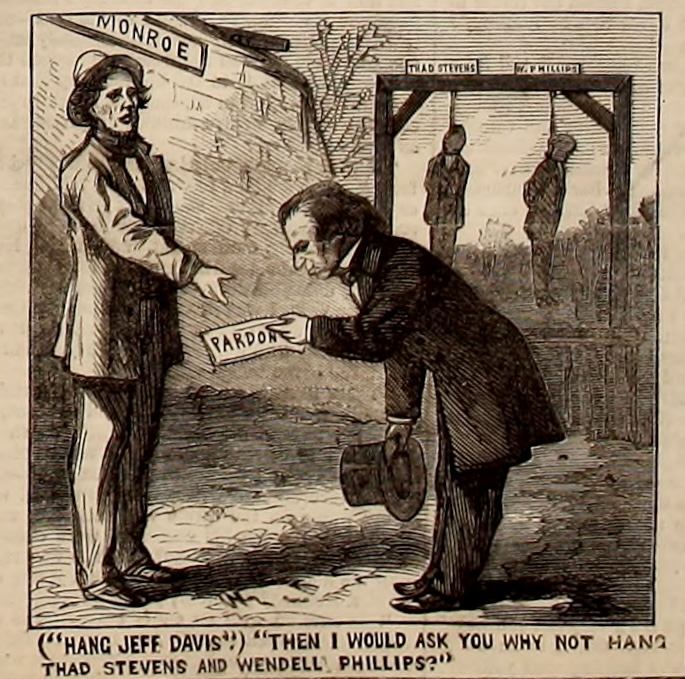
Hecklers on Andrew Johnson's Swing Around the Circle tour called upon him to hang Jeff Davis; he asked them to consider hanging Wendell Phillips and Thaddeus Stevens instead (Panel from Andy's Trip by Thomas Nast, Harper's Weekly, October 27, 1866)

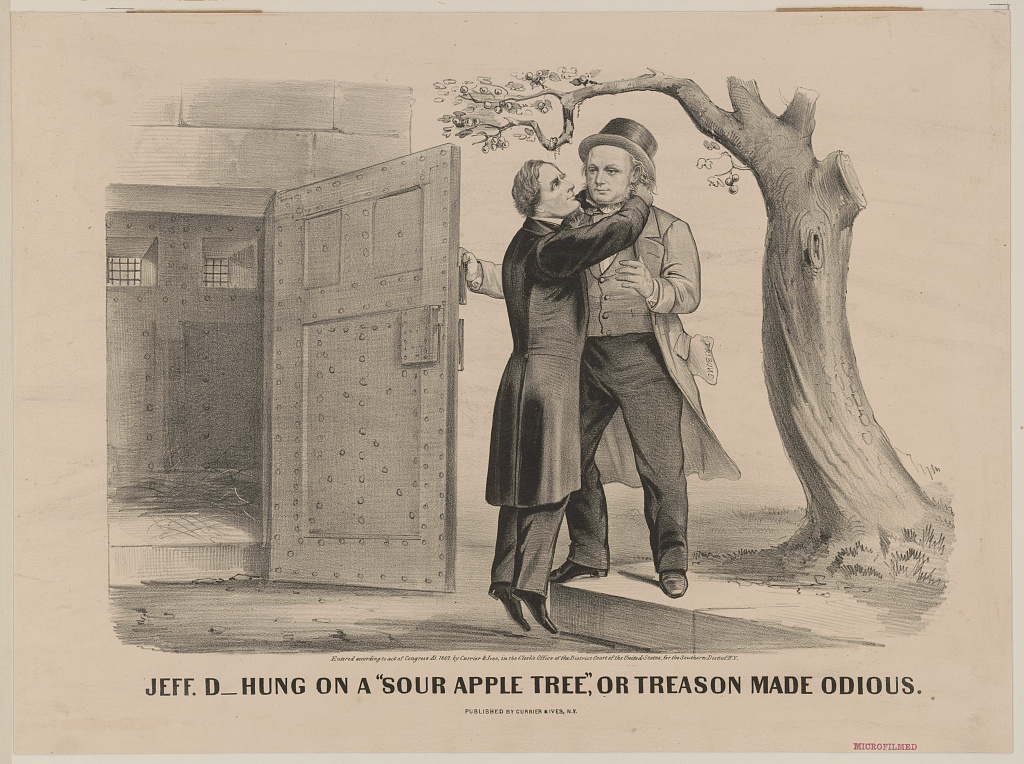
This political cartoon references the song lyric, and one of Andrew Johnson's stump-speech stock phrases ("treason must made odious"), in its critique of Horace Greeley's support for releasing Davis from Fort Monroe (Library of Congress LC-DIG-pga-09194)

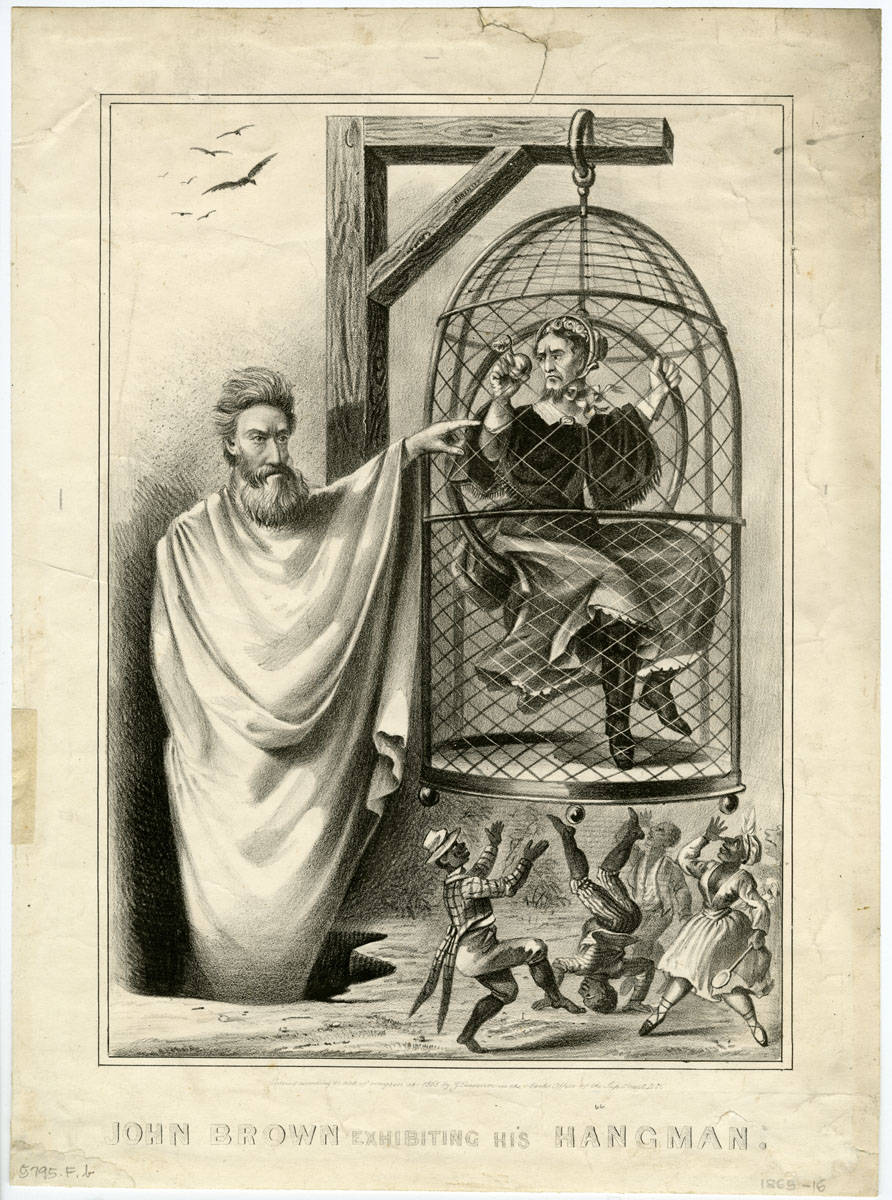
1865 cartoon showing the ghost of John Brown cursing his hangman, Jeff Davis, who is seen hanging in a cage, holding a sour apple in his hand.

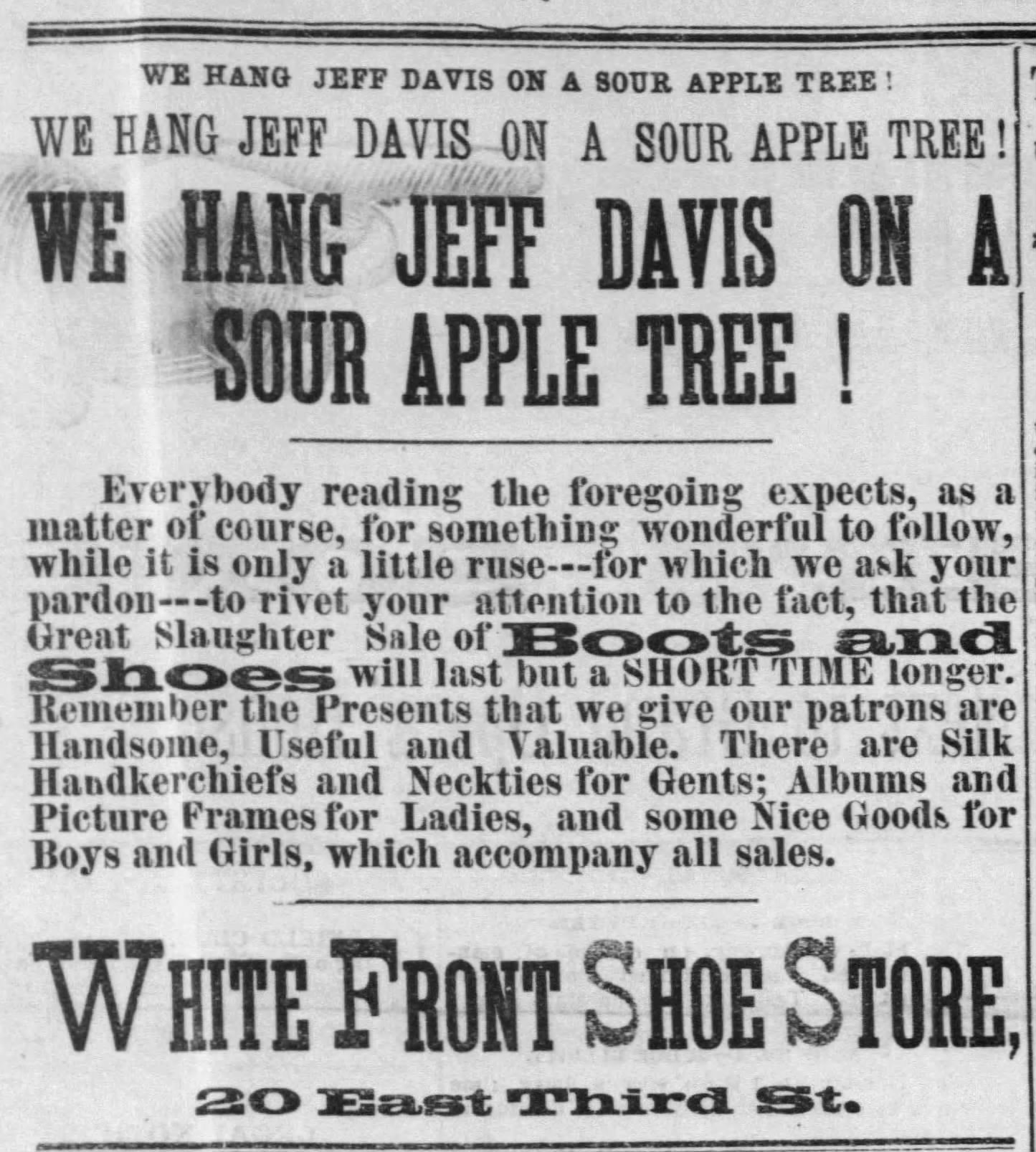
"White Front Shoe Store advertisement" (The Dayton Herald, Dayton, Ohio, February 6, 1888)

== See also ==
- Treason laws in the United States
- Virginia v. John Brown § Execution
- Category:People executed for treason against the United States
- commons:Category:Caricatures of Jefferson Davis
