= Southern Justice (political cartoon) =

1867 American artwork by Thomas Nast

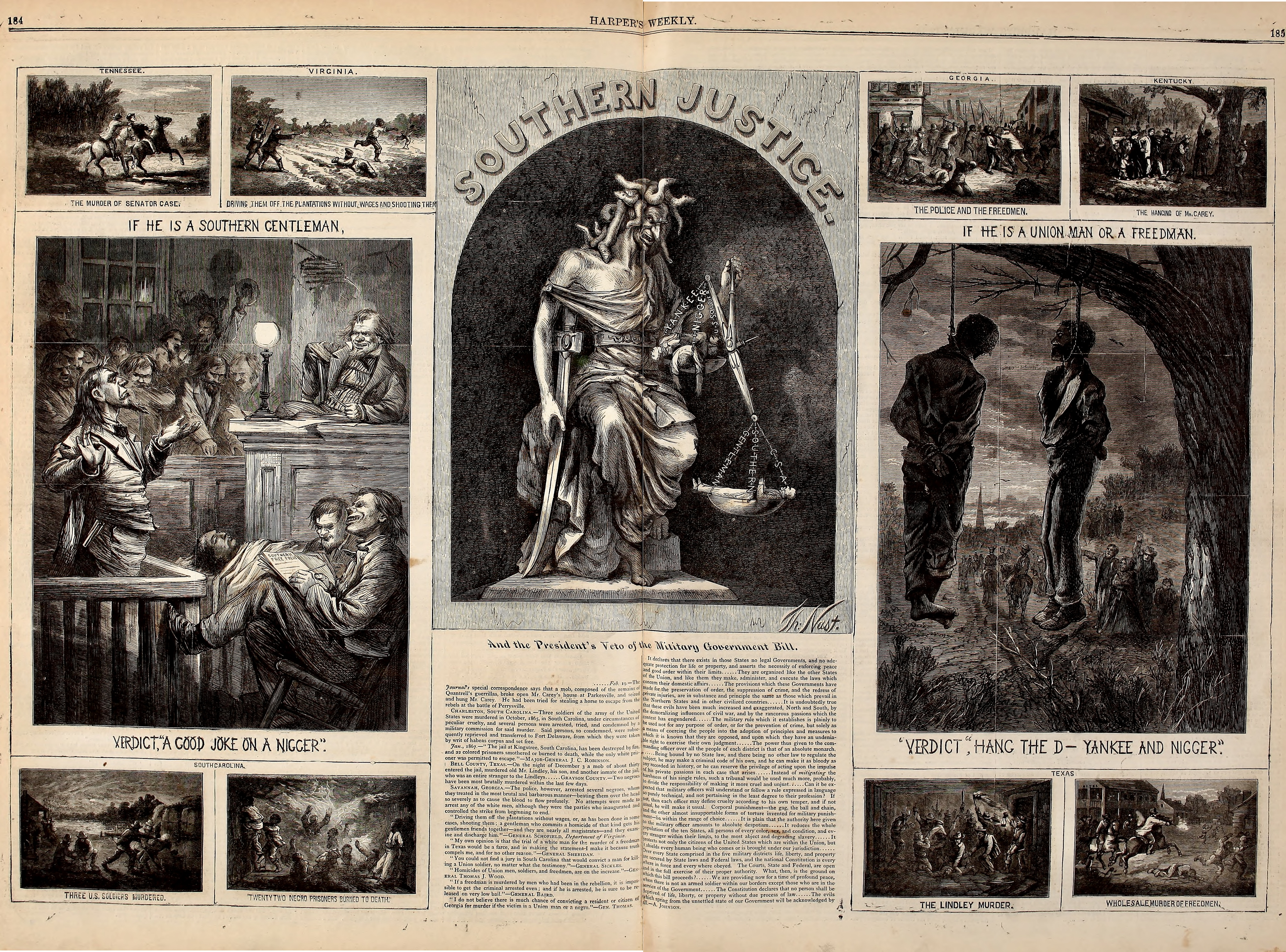
- Artist: Thomas Nast
- Completion date: 23 March 1867
- Medium: Woodcut
- Dimensions: 34.61 cm × 52 cm (13.625 in × 20.5 in)
- Website: Harper's Weekly (archive.org)

Southern Justice is a multi-panel political cartoon by Bavarian-American caricaturist Thomas Nast, advocating for continued military occupation of the Southern United States to protect freedmen, Unionists, and Republicans from violence. Published as a double-page spread in the March 23, 1867 issue of Harper's Weekly, Southern Justice is one of a series of images Nast produced in 1866 and 1867 that "emphasized freedmen's potential in American life...the suffering of freedmen, the barbarity of night riders, and the dangers of Johnson's reconstruction policies to real men and women—people whose potential could be lost through northern inaction."

Patting its own back a bit, Harper's Weekly ran an unbylined feature on Nast in May that described Amphitheatrum Johnsonianum and Southern Justice as "very significant. They tell their own story. They represent not accidents, such as might happen anywhere, but a system of brutal crime...persecution and destruction of loyal citizens of the United States...These pictures are the argument of the Reconstruction bill. The civil law of Rebel states, made and administered by ex-rebels, is found to be no defense against committed upon loyal men, and if those men are to be protected, it must be for the present by the national arm." In images like Southern Justice, Nast represented "the brutal treatment of Negroes, Unionists, and Republicans by unregenerate Southern whites" and the Northern expectation that after the harvest of death that "the ideals fought for would be translated into reality" during the Reconstruction Era.

== Details ==
Southern Justice is unusually text-heavy for a Nast cartoon; half of the text is a list of references to incidents visually described, half is an excerpt from Andrew Johnson's veto of the military government bill. Congress passed the Reconstruction Acts over Johnson's veto.

Details of Southern Justice
Detail	Caption	Citation text	Additional info
	"South Carolina: Twenty-Two Negroes Burned to Death"	Jan. 1867: "The jail at Kingstree has been destroyed by fire, and 22 colored prisoners smothered or burned to death, while the only white prisoner was permitted to escape." —Major-General J.C. Robinson	U.S. Army officers arrested the three law enforcement officers for reckless negligence in the Kingstree jail fire. All three were acquitted by a Williamsburg County jury.
	"Tennessee: The Murder of Senator Case"	n/a	Tennessee state senator Almon Case was murdered by an ex-Confederate named Frank Farris.
	"Kentucky: The Hanging of Mr. Carey"	"Feb. 19...the Journal's special correspondence says that a mob, composed of the remains of Quantrell's guerrillas, broke open Mr. Carey's house at Parkesville, and seized and hung Mr. Carey. He had been tried for stealing a horse to escape from the rebels at the battle of Perrysville."	Victium was Named Thomas Carvier see listing at
	"South Carolina: Three U.S. Soldiers Murdered"	"Charleston, South Carolina--Three soldiers of the army of the United States were murdered in October,1865, in South Carolina, under circumstances of peculiar cruelty, and several persons were arrested, tried and condemned by a military commission for said murder. Said persons, so condemned, were subsequently reprieved and transferred to Fort Delaware from which they were taken by writ of habeas corpus and set free."	The Three soldiers were Corporal Corbett and Privates Emory Smith and MAson Brown of Company A 1st Battalion Maine Veteran Volunteers who were guarding 15 bales of seized cotton; they were killed Midnight October 8,1865
	"Texas: The Lindley Murder"	"Bell County, Texas: On the night of December 3, a mob of about thirty entered the jail, murdered Mr. Lindley, his son, and another inmate of the jail, who was an entire stranger to the Lindleys."	After Jasper Lindley and Sam Martin were murdered, Jonathan and Newton Lindley and 15 soldiers shot their killers. The Lindleys were then jailed, and later shot to death in their jail cells by allies of men they shot.
	"Texas: Wholesale Murder of Freedmen"	"Grayson County, Texas: Two negroes have been most brutally murdered within the last few days."	
	"Virginia: Driving them off plantations without wages and shooting them"	"Driving them off the plantations without wages, or, as has been done in some cases, shooting them; a gentleman who commits a homicide of that kind gets gentlemen friends together-and they are nearly all magistrates-and they examine and discharge him." —General Schofield, Department of Virginia	
	"Georgia: The Police and the Freedmen"	"The police, however, arrested several negroes who treated in the most brutal and barbarous manner, beating them over the head so severely as to cause the blood to flow profusely. No attempts were made to arrest any of the white men, although they were the parties who inaugurated and controlled the strike from beginning to end."	

"My own opinion is that the trial of a white man for the murder of a freedman in Texas would be a farce, and in making the statement make it I make it because the truth compels me, and for no other reason." —General Sheridan

"You could not find a jury in South Carolina that would convict a man for killing a Union soldier, no matter what the testimony." —General Sickles

"Homicides of Union men, soldiers, and freedmen, are on the increase." —General Thomas J. Wood

"If a freedman is murdered by men who had been in the rebellion, it is impossible to get the criminal arrested even; and if he is arrested, he is sure to be released on very low bail." —General Baird

"I do not believe there is much chance of convicting a resident or citizen of Georgia for murder if the victim is a Union man or a negro." —Gen. Thomas

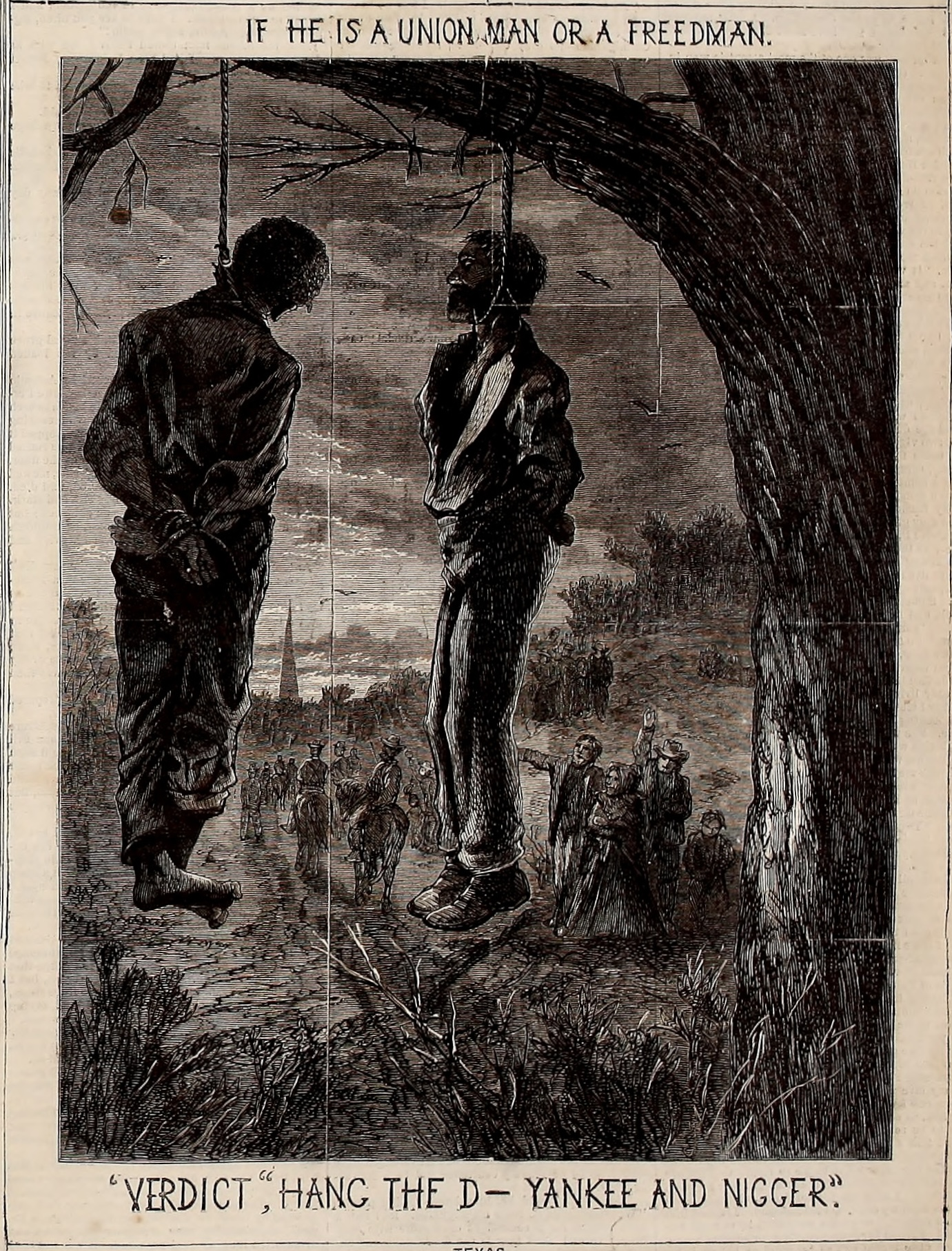
Lynching in the United States intensified during the Reconstruction Era and continued until the 1930s

== See also ==
- Civil rights movement (1865–1896)
- Andy's Trip – published October 27, 1866
