= Treason must be made odious =

Stock phrase of U.S. politician Andrew Johnson (1808–1875)

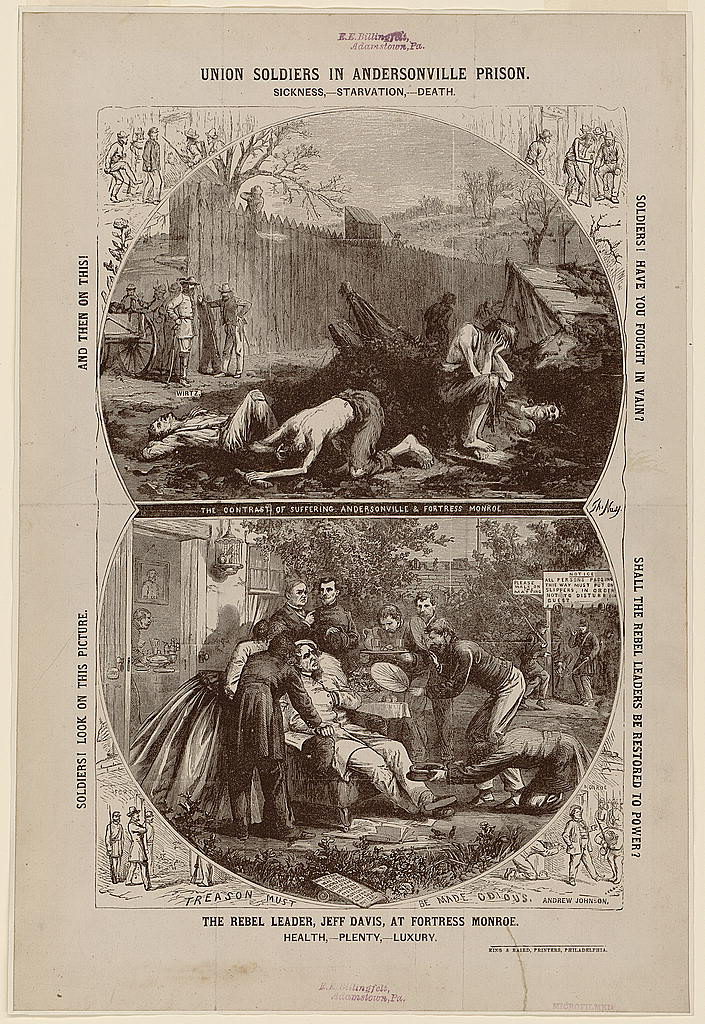
Thomas Nast included the line in this image comparing living conditions of Andersonville prisoners and Jefferson Davis at Fort Monroe

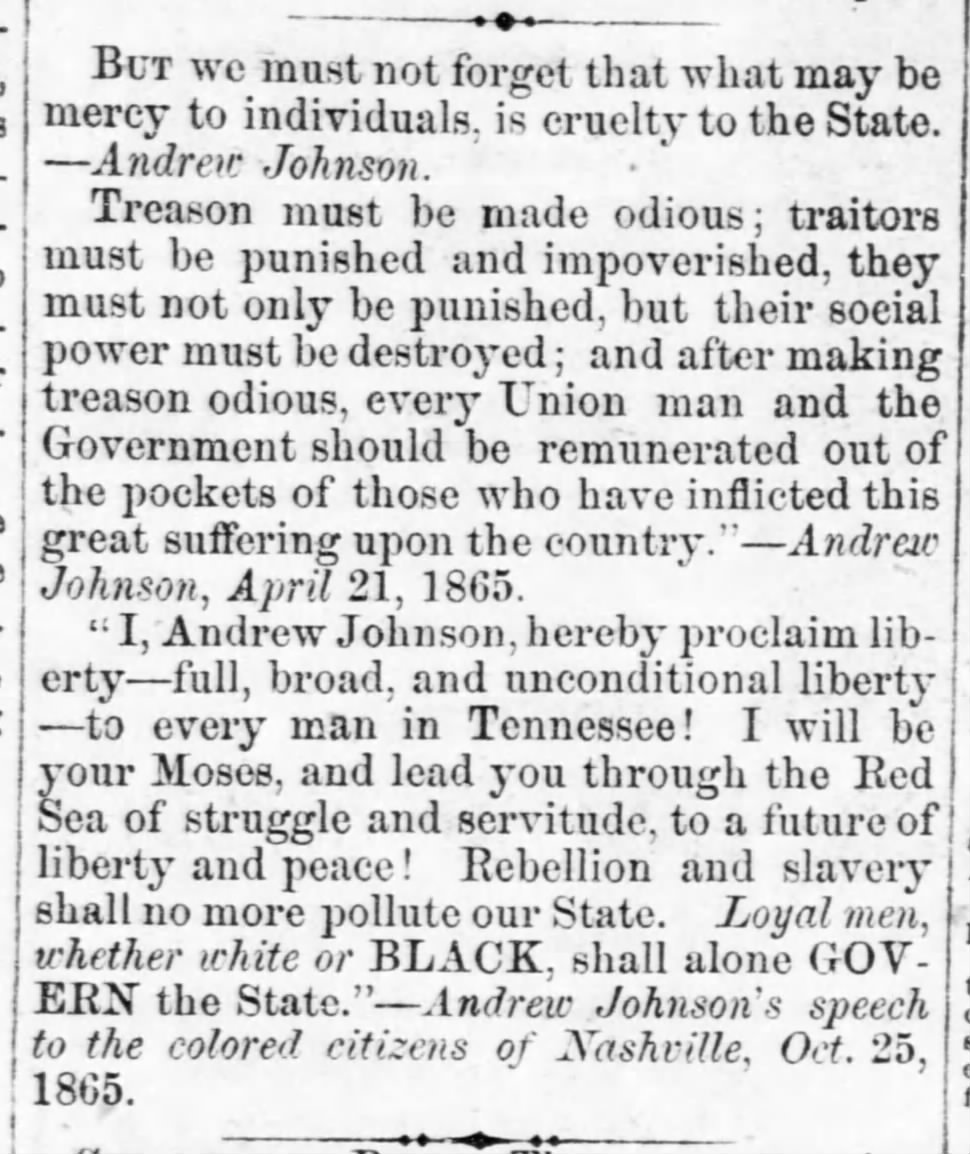
Parson Brownlow's newspaper had quotes at the ready to remind Johnson of his past statements (Brownlow's Knoxville Whig, July 4, 1866)

"Treason must be made odious" was the most common shorthand rendering of a stump speech (a standardized campaign speech repeatedly made by a politician at a series of locations and times) made by Tennessean Andrew Johnson when he was military governor and a U.S. vice-presidential candidate in 1864. The phrase became relevant to the post-American Civil War legal issues surrounding the potential prosecution of former Confederate politicians and officers, as well as questions of enfranchisement of freedmen versus the re-enfranchisement of ex-Confederates. It has been described as "one of the best-remembered sayings of one of the least-remembered of our Presidents."

== History ==
The notion of a "stump speech," in which a politician nominally stands upon the stump of a sawed-down tree to make a speech to potential voters from a physically elevated position, dates to about 1820 in Tennessee. According to historian Thomas P. Abernethy, "Public office was eagerly sought by the young lawyers and others, and electioneering, unknown in the earlier days, grew rapidly in vogue during the period following 1819. Stump speaking came to be an art and cajolery a profession, while whiskey flowed freely at the hustings. The politicians could most easily attain their object by appealing to the prejudices of the masses."

Andrew Johnson, a slave-owning Southern Unionist, was the only member of the U.S. Senate from a secessionist state who stayed loyal at the outbreak of the American Civil War. At the outbreak of the American Civil War, Tennessee had initially seceded to the Confederate States of America under governor Isham G. Harris, but when the Volunteer State was restored to the Union in 1862, Lincoln appointed Andrew Johnson to be the military governor in Nashville. Initially Johnson believed that Tennesseans who supported the Confederacy were loyal Americans who had been misguided by malignant aristocrats, but after a few months in office he found Confederate allegiance to be widespread and so shifted his approach, a change mirrored by shifts in Washington: "As battlefield casualties mounted and the Lincoln administration girded for a long war by mobilizing the industrial and emotional resources of the North, Union war aims, exemplified by the Second Confiscation Act and the Preliminary Emancipation Proclamation, shifted from mere restoration to the reconstruction of Southern society."

As military governor he made speeches arguing that "treason must be made odious and traitors impoverished" on the Fourth of July 1862, throughout 1863, in speeches to the 3rd Minnesota Regiment, and at Columbia, at Shelbyville, at Nashville on the Fourth of July, and at Franklin on August 22. The Nashville Union newspaper commented on his July 4, 1862 speech, "The sentiment uttered, from the portico of the Capitol last night, by Governor Johnson: 'Treason must be made odious and traitors impoverished,' was a golden sentence. It fell upon our ears like the trumpet voice of a leader who had bared his strong arm for victory. The audience felt so, and shouted with enthusiastic approval." A speech on theme was also made in Washington, D.C. on April 3, 1865, when he was vice president. During this entire period, he consistently recycled what George Creel described as his stock phrases: "Treason is a crime and must be punished," "Treason must be made odious," and "What may be mercy to the individual is cruelty to the state."

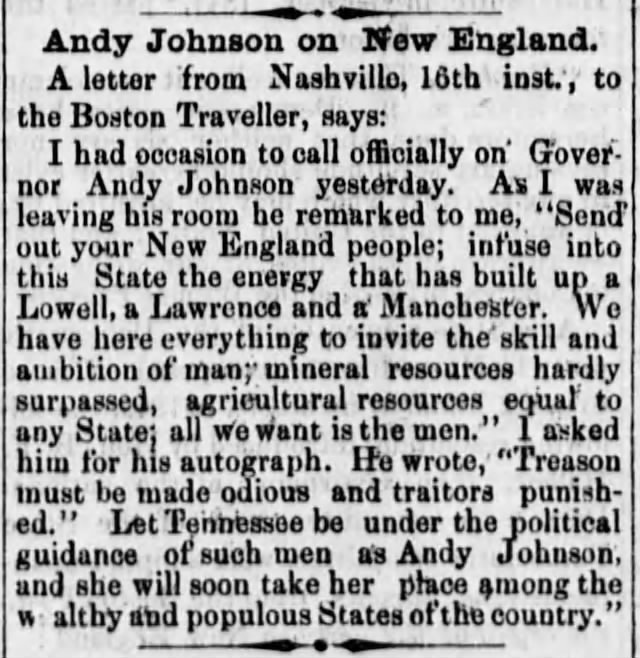
"I asked him for his autograph. He wrote 'Treason must be made odious and traitors punished.'" (Belmont Chronicle, St. Clairsville, Ohio, Oct. 8, 1863)

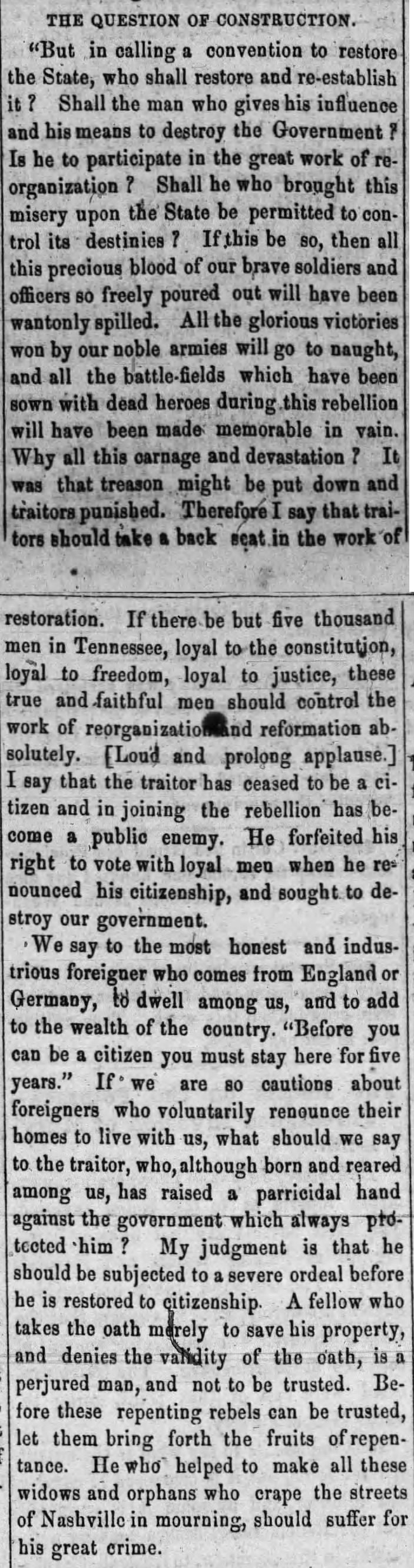
"Union and Democracy Speech of Andrew Johnson at Nashville – Position of the Union Candidate" (The Sunbury Gazette, Sunbury, Penn., July 9, 1864)

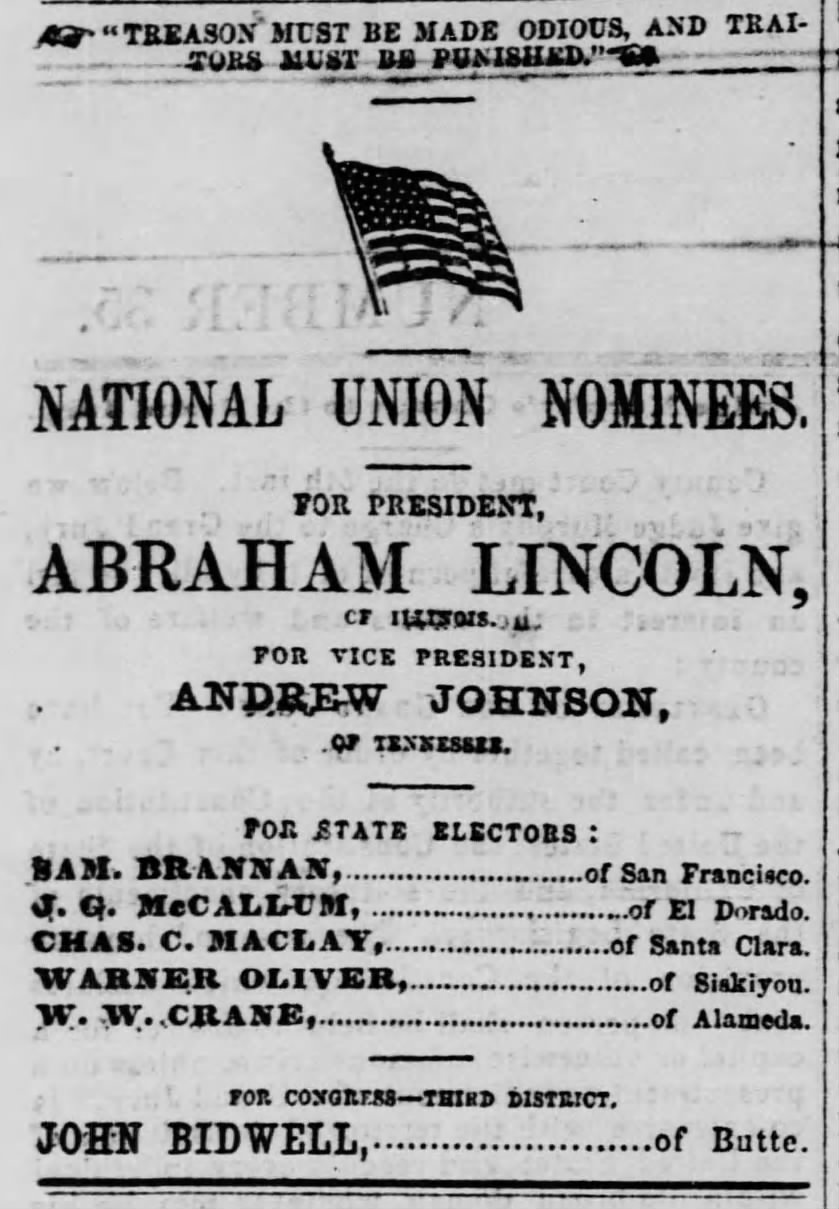
A California newspaper included the quote in its endorsement of the slate of National Union Party nominees (Weekly Trinity Journal, Weaverville, Calif. Sept. 10, 1864)

However, after Johnson became president of the United States following the assassination of Lincoln, he dropped this theme and did little to no prosecution of ex-Confederates. The reversal became a major campaign issue, and his opponents were quick to point to Johnson's retreat from his many past pledges on this issue. For example, during Johnson's 1866 electioneering tour, while he was departing his hotel in Cleveland, Ohio for the train, "As his victoria neared the Public Square, he caught sight of a banner stretched between the Forest City House and the Rouse Block reading, 'In the work of reconstruction, traitors must be made to take back seats.' Angrily, [Johnson] jammed his beaver hat down over his eyes and kept his glance on the door of his carriage until he had passed." Similarly the Library of Congress holds a long letter from Peter Cooper to President Johnson that quotes extensively from his "treason must be made odious" speeches and then comments, "After having read the many patriotic sayings and denunciations that you have made against Rebels and their Rebellion, I was led to believe that you would be about the last man that would recommend or accept of any terms for reconstruction that would not offer a full security for the future, even if you might be persuaded by myself and others to waive all indemnity for the past."

In October 1866, U.S. Senator Charles Sumner, one of the leaders of the Radical Republicans, railed against Johnson's "one-man power," claiming that he was providing openly providing aid and succor to rebels, and stating:

You do not forget that, in accepting his nomination as Vice-President, he rushed forward to declare that the rebel States must be remodelled; that confiscation must be enforced, and that rebels must be excluded from the work of reconstruction. His language was plain and unmistakable. Announcing that 'government must be fixed on the principles of eternal justice' he went on to declare, that, 'if the man who gave his influence and his means to destroy the government should be permitted to participate in the great work of reorganization, then all the precious blood so freely poured out will have been wantonly spilled, and all our victories go for naught.' True; very true. Then, in words of surpassing energy, he cried out, that 'the great plantations must be seized and divided into small farms,' and that 'traitors should take a back seat in the work of restoration.' Perhaps the true rule was never expressed with more homely and vital force than in this last saying, often repeated in different forms: 'For rebels, back seats.' Add to this that other saying so often repeated, 'treason must be made odious,' and you have two great principles of a just reconstruction, once proclaimed by the President, but now practically disowned by him.

The phrase, and the promise to persecute rebels, came up again after Johnson's presidency ended. He ran for a seat in the U.S. Senate in 1869 and "Confederate sympathizers" reminded Democratic voters of Johnson's past verbal aggression. Johnson came in third out of three candidates, even losing his home county. In 1885, when Chauncey Depew and Frederick Grant published an exchange suggesting that circa 1867 Johnson had ordered Ulysses S. Grant – in his role as head of the U.S. military – to issue "a proclamation from the White House, directing all Southern States to send up to Washington their full number of representatives and Senators, of course on the old basis" (which would have given Johnson a legislative majority), and Grant refused (which may or may not have been abrogation of duty), the old line resurfaced, and one commenter (who thought Grant had, in fact, acted illegally and subversively in refusing the order) wrote, "No politician was a more complete master of buncomb than Andrew Johnson. His utterances were loud and repeated that 'treason must be made odious and traitors punished'. Yet he was issuing pardons by the hundreds or thousands all the time and the cases of punishment were few." In 1917 a Utah newspaper that advocated for the federal prosecution (and potential execution) of the Wobblies, resurfaced the phrase, stating, "Old Andrew Johnson did not accomplish much that appealed to the memory of red-blooded Americans, but he did say that 'Treason must be made odious,' and this rule of action is even more applicable today than during the first dark days of the Reconstruction period."

The phrase continues to be recalled in comparisons of the political character and impeachment of Andrew Johnson to the political character and impeachments of Donald Trump: "Johnson also anticipated Trump in the violent abusiveness of his rhetoric toward political enemies. That was ironic, in a way: He had first attracted the support of Republicans as Lincoln's 1864 running mate thanks to his frequent and intense denunciations of his fellow Southern secessionists as traitors who deserved to be strung up, if not killed in combat."

== See also ==
- Pardons for ex-Confederates
- Command of Army Act
- Impeachment of Andrew Johnson
- Treason laws in the United States
- Virginia v. John Brown – Criminal trial held at Charles Town
- "Oh we'll hang Jeff Davis from a sour apple tree"

== Sources ==
- Abernethy, Thomas P. (1927). "Andrew Jackson and the Rise of South-Western Democracy". The American Historical Review. 33 (1): 64–77. doi:10.2307/1838111. ISSN 0002-8762. JSTOR 1838111.
