= Stump speech =

Speech used by a politician

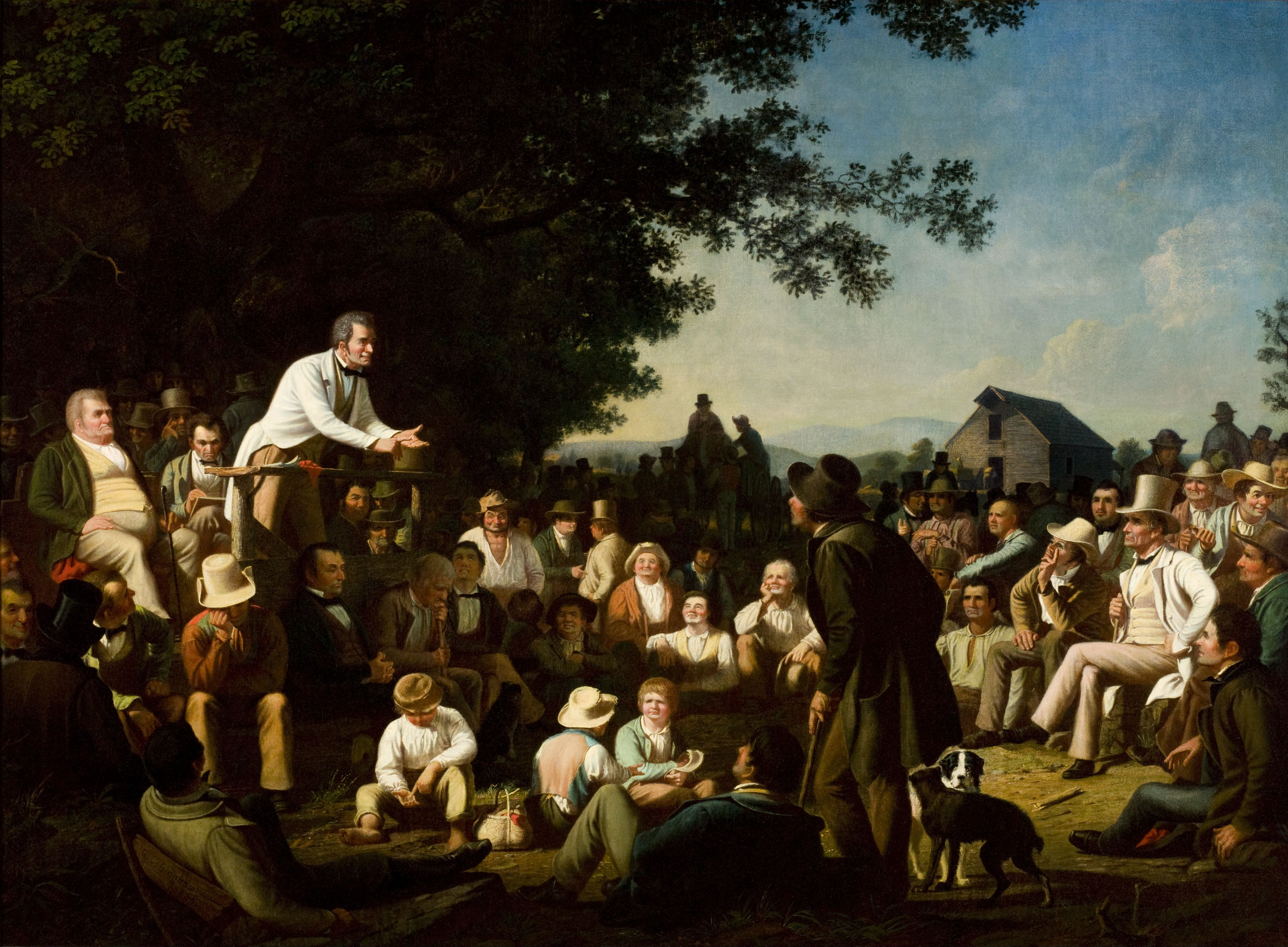
1854 painting by George Caleb Bingham depicting a politician making a stump speech

A political stump speech is a standard speech used by a politician running for office. Typically a candidate who schedules many appearances prepares a short standardized stump speech that is repeated verbatim to each audience, before opening to questions.

== Etymology ==
The term derives from the early American custom in which candidates campaigned from town to town and stood upon a sawed off tree stump to deliver their speech.

== U.S. campaigns ==
In presidential campaigns in the United States, a candidate's speech at his or her party's presidential nominating convention usually forms the basis for the stump speech for the duration of the national campaign.

Stump speeches are not meant to generate news, outside of local media covering a candidate's appearance. National media usually ignore their contents in their daily news coverage. The predictability of stump speeches gives reporters a general indication that the candidate will soon conclude his speech. An example of this comes from New York Governor Nelson Rockefeller, who would constantly use the phrase "the brotherhood of man, under the fatherhood of God" toward the end of his speeches during his multiple bids for the Republican presidential nomination. Reporters covering Rockefeller came to abbreviate the expression as BOMFOG.
