= Dostie =

Dostie is a surname. Notable people with the surname include:

- Alain Dostie (born 1943), Canadian cinematographer, film director, and screenwriter
- Alexandre Dostie, Canadian film director
- Anthony Paul Dostie (1821–1866), American dentist and civil rights advocate
- Donald Dostie, American politician
