= Memphis riot =

Memphis riot or riots may refer to one of these events in Memphis, Tennessee:

- Memphis riots of 1866, May 1–3, deadly clashes between returning Black soldiers and local police
- Memphis riot of March 28, 1968, part of the Memphis Sanitation Strike
