= François Lacroix =

Merchant from New Orleans, Louisiana (1806–1876)

François Lacroix (1806–1876) was a wealthy Creole of color, tailor, fabric merchant, and prominent landowner in New Orleans, Louisiana. His son, Victor Lacroix, was killed in the infamous New Orleans massacre of 1866, when primarily black Republicans gathered for a constitutional convention at the Mechanics Institute in New Orleans and were attacked by primarily white Democrats, including armed police and firemen. He supported his son's widow, a white woman named Sarah Brown, as well as their two children, until his death.

== Life ==
Francophone and Catholic, Lacroix was born free in Cuba, as was his brother Julien. Their parents, a white Frenchman and a free mulâtresse, fled there from Saint Domingue following the Haitian Revolution. Along with fellow tailor and Creole Etienne Cordeviolle, Lacroix founded the tailoring shop known as "Cordeviolle & Lacroix" located off of Canal Street. As an extremely successful businessman, he acquired a large real estate portfolio as well as several slaves over the course of his life. He likewise supported a number of philanthropies, including La Société de la Sainte Famille and the Institut Catholique des orphelins indigents, of which he served for a time as president.

Deeply affected by his son's death, Lacroix was a participant in séances to try to communicate with him.

An exhibit about his life was put on at a New Orleans Public Library.
