= 1st Tennessee Colored Heavy Artillery Regiment =

1st Tennessee Heavy Artillery Regiment (African Descent)
- Active: June 1863 to March 11, 1864
- Country: United States
- Allegiance: Union
- Branch: artillery

The 1st Tennessee Heavy Artillery Regiment (African Descent) was an artillery regiment that served in the Union Army during the American Civil War.

== Service ==
The 1st Tennessee Heavy Artillery (African Descent) was organized at Memphis, Tennessee, and mustered in for three years under the command of Colonel Ignatz G. Kappner. As was custom at the time, the regiment was designated the 1st Tennessee (Colored) Heavy Artillery. The regiment was initially recruited as eight companies, but actually mustered with twelve.

The regiment was attached to 1st Brigade, 5th Division, District of Memphis, XVI Corps, Department of the Tennessee, to April 1864.

The 1st Tennessee Heavy Artillery (African Descent) ceased to exist on March 11, 1864, when its designation was changed to the 2nd United States Heavy Artillery Regiment (Colored). The latter designation was changed again on April 26, 1864, to 3rd United States Colored Heavy Artillery Regiment.

== Detailed service ==
During its brief existence, the regiment performed post and garrison duty at Memphis, and at Fort Pickering, Defenses of Memphis, June 1863 to April 1864.

== Commanders ==
- Colonel Ignatz G. Kappner

== See also ==
- List of Tennessee Union Civil War units
- Tennessee in the Civil War
