= Frances Thompson =

American trans woman and anti-rape activist

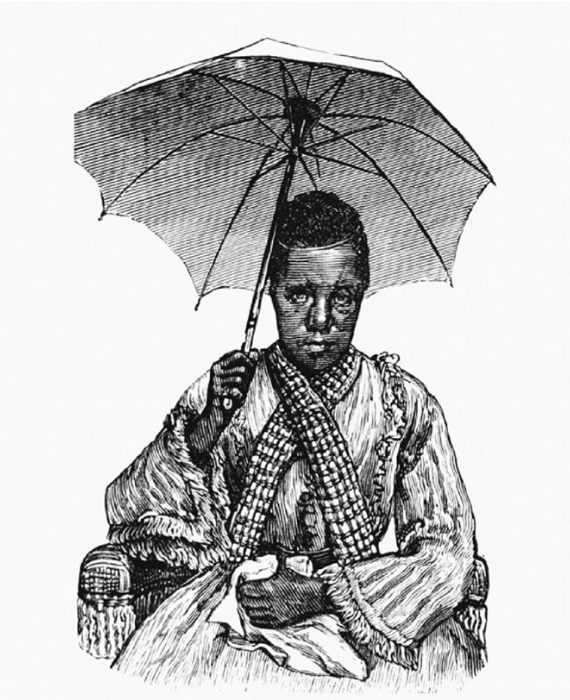
- Frances wearing a dress, an 1876 illustration for The Days' Doings
- Born: 1840; Alabama
- Died: 1876 (aged 35–36)
- Known for: Memphis Riots of 1866 testimony, living as a black trans woman in the 19th century

Frances Thompson (c. 1840 – 1876) was an American, formerly enslaved Black trans woman and anti-rape activist. She was one of the five Black women to testify before a congressional committee that investigated the Memphis massacre of 1866. She is the first known trans woman to testify before the United States Congress. Thompson and a housemate, Lucy Smith, were attacked by a white mob and were among many freedwomen who were raped during the massacre. In 1876, Thompson was arrested for "being a man dressed in women's clothing," leading to national news attention.

== Early life ==
Frances Thompson was born into slavery around 1840. According to Thompson, she was raised in Maryland. She was enslaved by a man named Robert Walker and later traveled with his family to Memphis, Tennessee. The Walker family allowed her to dress in dresses and recognized her as a girl. She was known to wear bright colored dresses, keep a clean-shaven face and dress in feminine apparel. Since she was a child she used mobility aids and crutches due to cancer in her foot. Newspapers often referred to her as "crutchy".

According to her testimony, everyone but her mistress was killed during their service in the Confederate Army. Since the majority of her master's family was killed, she was a free woman in Memphis at the age of 26. She rented an apartment on Gayoso Street, in a majority Black neighborhood known as "Hell’s Half Acre". She washed clothes, sewed, and ironed clothes to make a wage as a free Black woman. She was assisted by her 16-year-old housemate Lucy Smith, who later appeared in court alongside Frances to testify. By the time of the Memphis Massacre, she had been living publicly as a woman for at least 20 years.

== Memphis Massacre ==
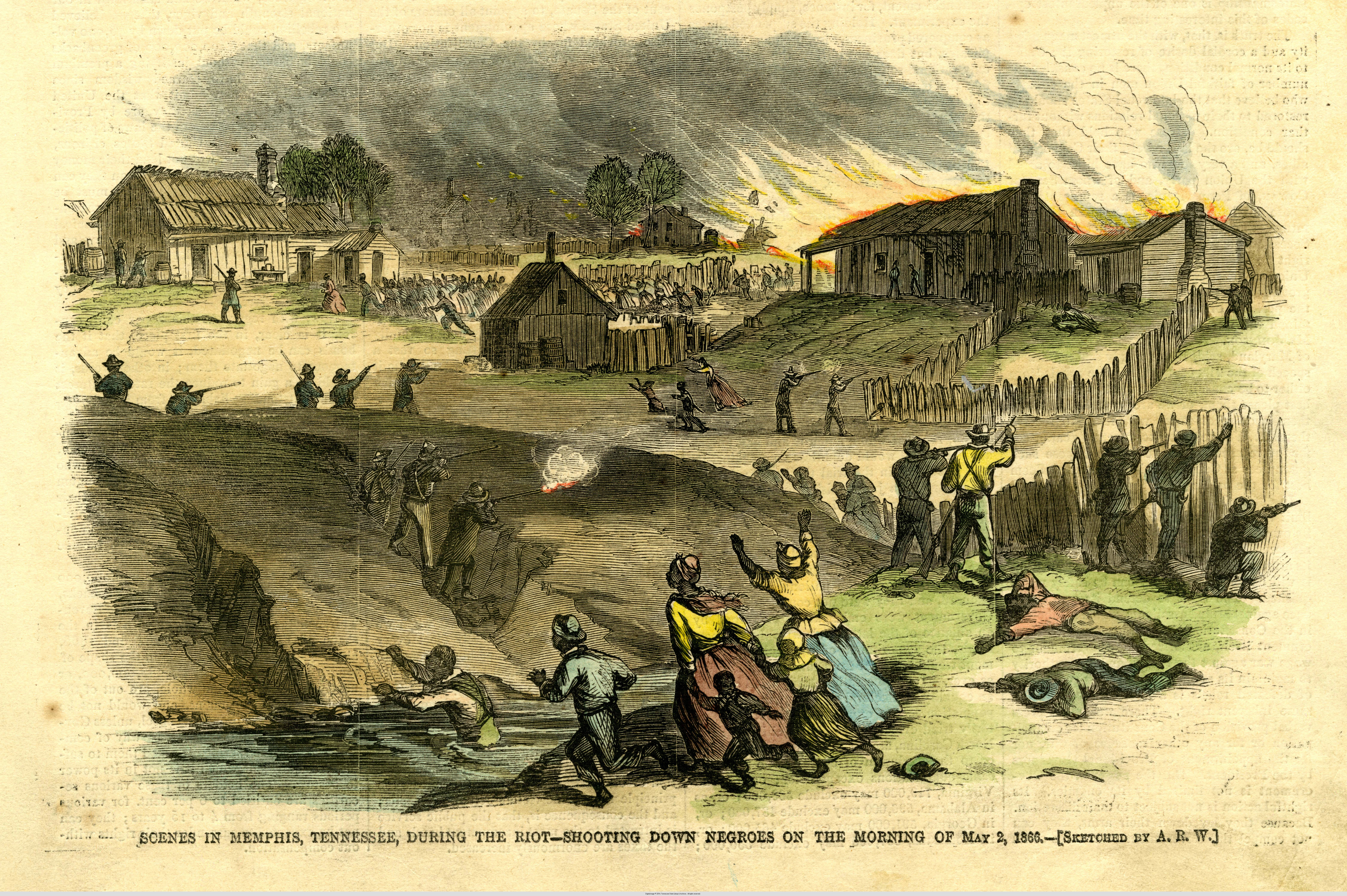
This is a depiction of the Memphis Massacre in Harper's Weekly (circa 1866).

=== Background ===
During the Civil War, many African Americans fled farms and plantations in the mid-south for the Union camps and shanty towns around Memphis. They began arriving in greater number after the Union victory in the First Battle of Memphis in 1862. The African American population in Memphis increased from 4,000 in 1860 to 16,000 in 1865. Combined with the growing number of Irish immigrants coming to settle in Tennessee after the Great Famine, this population growth created competition for the few jobs available. At the time, Memphis was one of the few safe places for African Americans in the Civil War south. After the war, free Black people could make their own way there, rather than returning to low-wage plantation work. The city was home to predominantly African American neighborhoods, such as Beale, Linden, Turley, St. Martin, and Causey Streets.

In 1866, South Memphis was the site of instances of politically and racially motivated violence that came be known as the Memphis Massacre. The Civil War had just ended, and Reconstruction was in full swing in the South. Whites, particularly poor Irish immigrants, feared that formerly enslaved Black people would take their jobs, and the simmering tensions were brought to a boil by newspapers. The Memphis police force had just cut back on their numbers. The tension was made worse when the Army decided to put Black soldiers in charge of patrolling the streets of Memphis. White police officers, most of whom were Irish, were angry and clashed with the soldiers. Soldiers would be arrested for minor crimes by the police and instances of police brutality rose.

=== Massacre ===
The day before the riot, rumors were flying among the white community that Black residents were planning a violent altercation. Most soldiers had been discharged and were waiting for their pay. While most of their weapons had been returned to the Army, some soldiers had access to private weapons. That afternoon, April 30, a fight broke out between white police officers and Black soldiers. The fight split up but rumors spread quickly and that night, drunk Black soldiers fired pistols in the sky.

The day of the riot, May 1, 1866, a group of Black people including women and children were having a street party. There was shouting and a firearm went off. Three police officers decided to intervene, although they were quickly outnumbered and retreated. They called for reinforcement and began chasing the Black people. One police officer shot himself in the leg while running, which was blamed on the Black soldiers. News of the injury spread fast and angered other police officers who began shooting and attacking. A police officer reported that two officers had been shot and killed. This drew more police and other white residents of Memphis, including some government officials. However, by that point, most of the Black residents had dispersed.

With no one to have an altercation with, the white people turned to burning down Black homes, schools, and churches. The mob of angry people forced some of their victims to stay in their homes while they burned down. This group continued into the morning, at which point Black people were fleeing for their lives. In the end, the mob burned around 50-90 homes and killed 46 Black people and injured 75, including five women raped.

=== Rape of Thompson and Smith ===
During the Memphis Massacre, Thompson was in her house with her roommate, Lucy Smith, when seven white men, including three police officers, broke into her house and demanded her to cook for them. They demanded her to make them eggs, ham, and biscuits. They then demanded a woman to sleep with; when Thompson refused, they drew their pistols and raped her. They also raped Smith, who was 16 at the time. The men then robbed her and Smith of around $300, ($6,597 in 2025). According to Smith's testimony, the men claimed they were partially motivated by the pictures of Joseph Hooker and other union officers, and that "they would not have hurt us so bad if it had not been for these pictures".

In the weeks after, Thompson was left sick and unable to work and Smith could not speak for a few days because the men had choked her so violently. They were attended by a Black doctor, who helped them recover.

== Congressional testimony ==
Thompson was among a group of 170 people who testified before the U.S. Congress during a committee hearing to document the terror, death, rape, arson, and theft they experienced during the Memphis Riots. In her testimony, Thompson spoke out about what had happened to her and Lucy in front of a Congressional panel. Her account of the brutal rape of her and her roommate drew panel members to tears. Thompson and Lucy's emotional accounts captivated many people about the horrors that happened in the Memphis race riot. Although this substantial evidence stacked against the rioters, they were released with no repercussions.

As a result of her testimony, she faced hardship and abuse regarding her gender identity as a transgender woman being widely known around the South. She later faced many false accusations that claimed she operated a brothel. In addition to being among the 170 people who testified in front of Congress during the Memphis Massacre, Thompson was the first transgender woman to testify as well. This led to numerous physician examinations which led to her being outed as a transgender woman. Southern Democrats weaponized her identity as a transgender woman to discredit her and other Black women's claims of rape by white men.

Frances Thompson is seen as a key figure in the LGBTQIA community for her testimony, which was the first known instance of a transgender person speaking before Congress. Thompson was also one of the first recorded African American women to speak about sexual assault by a white man; this later had a large emphasis in the feminist and civil rights movements in the 1950s-1960s.

Her testimony helped pass the Enforcement Act of 1871 through outlining the violations of the 14th and 15th Amendments that guaranteed the rights of African Americans and highlighted the widespread violence and intimidation that sought to prevent African Americans from exercising their rights. Her actions were significant both for feminism and civil rights.

== Arrest ==
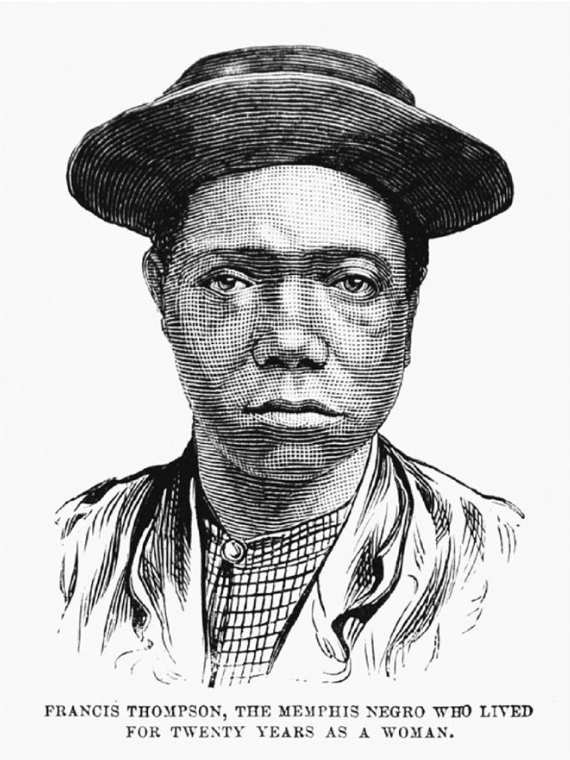
Frances Thompson

In 1876, ten years after Frances Thompson testified before the congressional committee investigating the riot in Memphis, Tennessee, she was arrested and sent to prison for cross-dressing. BlackPast.org says that her "biological gender was also exposed after she was forced to undergo numerous physician examinations" to determine her gender, declaring her a man, despite describing herself as "double-sex". When they discovered that she was "biologically male", this changed the entire case, and they would often refer to Frances as "Frank" or "Francis". Later, Frances Thompson would be interviewed about the examination and the case and asserted herself that she had been raised as a girl and that it should not matter to the public how she dresses.

Arrested for cross-dressing, Thompson was not able to pay the $55 ($1,663 in 2025) fine, so she was sent to prison where she served the entirety of her one-hundred-day sentence. She had cancer in her foot, and was not able to walk without support or crutches, but was sent to the chain gang nevertheless, where she was chained together with other inmates to perform various physical assignments. Additionally, while in prison, she was forced to dress as a male, despite identifying as a woman. There she was abused in prison by other inmates, including physical and sexual abuse. Discrimination played a large role in her arrest due to being a Black transgender woman living with a disease. Many people did not want to believe her, which is common among sexual assault survivors. People thought that since she was assigned male at birth that she was incapable of being raped and that therefore her testimony could not be trusted.

== Death ==
In 1876, shortly after her release from jail, she moved to North Memphis where she became sick and was taken to a hospital by some of her concerned community members due to her illness. She died later that same year due to dysentery, at the age of thirty-six.

== Legacy and impact ==
Thompson, growing up in a life of slavery, struggle, and disappointment managed to leave the world with a life of a lasting legacy and impact. Following the Memphis Massacre in 1866, Thompson made quick work to be heard. Not only did Thompson testify in front of Congress about the events of the Memphis massacre, but she was one of only five black women to testify about these events. Testifying put Thompson at risk, but she escaped violent retribution for her speech. Thompson's testimony notably played a pivotal role in winning public support for Black people during the "radical" Reconstruction of America after the Civil War.

Thompson not only impacted America as a black woman who testified in front of Congress, but was also the first-ever transgender woman to testify before the congressional committee. Thompson had spent the majority of her life as a transgender woman, who would advocate for her rights and bodily autonomy. 10 years after the Memphis massacre, in 1876, Thompson would later be arrested for cross-dressing but also maintained her rights as a woman. When asked about her gender after the arrest, Thompson would tell reporters that police had long been aware of her gender and that they only made an issue of it after premeditated plans. Thompson left jail and lived the short rest of her life as a transgender woman up until her death at the age of 36.

Thompson had become one of the first Black women, former slaves, and transgender women to testify in front of Congress. She also became an advocate for both bodily autonomy. Thompson's testimony would lead the government to enact legislation that protected the civil rights of newly emancipated African Americans.
