= Anthony Paul Dostie =

American civil rights advocate and dentist

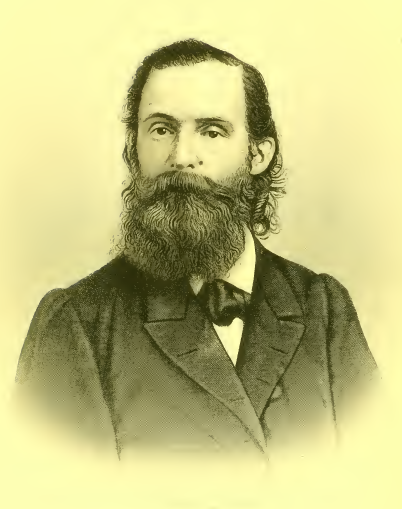
Anthony Paul Dostie

Anthony Paul Dostie (June 20, 1821 – August 5, 1866) was a dentist and civil rights advocate who was killed in the New Orleans massacre of 1866. Dostie was born in Saratoga County, New York.

A book about his life was published in 1868 as The Life of A.P. Dostie or The Conflict in New Orleans by his daughter Emily Hazen Reed. It is illustrated with an engraving of Dostie by Augustus Robin of New York.
