= Freedmen massacres =

United States anti-black racial pogroms (~1866–~1888)

- Date: 1865–1877
- Location: Southern United States (States of the former Confederacy)
- Type: Racial terror, voter suppression, mass murder, insurgency
- Outcome: An estimated 2,000+ documented lynchings and 30+ major massacres during the Reconstruction era; Overall death toll estimates by historians range up to 53,000 African Americans killed in post-war terror; Disenfranchisement of Black voters and the structural overthrow of Reconstruction governments; Systemic institutionalization of Jim Crow laws and white supremacy across the American South

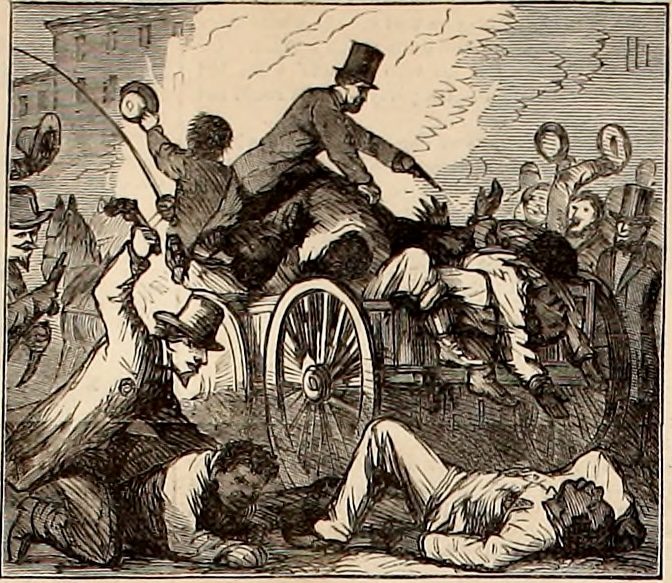
Thomas Nast illustration of the New Orleans massacre of 1866

The Freedmen massacres were a series of attacks on African-Americans which occurred in the states of the former Confederacy during Reconstruction, in the aftermath of the American Civil War. Many of these incidents were the result of a struggle over political power, especially after the voting rights of freedmen were protected through the Fifteenth Amendment to the United States Constitution. Robert Smalls estimated that overall 53,000 African-American were killed in post-war racial terrorism, an estimate increasingly considered plausible by historians.

With reference to emancipation, we are at the beginning of the war.

— David L. Swain, former governor of North Carolina, 1865. as quoted in Eric Foner's Reconstruction: America's Unfinished Revolution, 1863–1877

Anti-black violence during Reconstruction
Incident	Year	Month	State	County or parish	Notes
Memphis massacre	1866	05	Tennessee	Shelby	
New Orleans massacre	1866	07	Louisiana	Orleans	
Camilla massacre	1868	09	Georgia	Mitchell	
Opelousas massacre	1868	09	Louisiana	Opelousas	
1868 St. Bernard Parish Massacre	1868	10	Louisiana	St. Bernard	
Millican massacre	1868	07	Texas	Brazos	
Jackson County War	1869	n/a	Florida	Jackson	Ongoing for almost two years
Eutaw massacre	1870		Alabama		
Meridian race riot of 1871	1871	03	Mississippi	Lauderdale	
Colfax massacre	1873	04	Louisiana	Grant	
Election Massacre of 1874	1874	11	Alabama	Barbour	
Coushatta massacre	1874	08	Louisiana	Red River	
Vicksburg massacre	1874	12	Mississippi	Warren	Ongoing for almost one month
Battle of Liberty Place	1874	09	Louisiana	New Orleans	
Clinton Riot	1875	09	Mississippi	Hinds	
Hamburg massacre	1876	07	South Carolina	Aiken	
Ellenton massacre	1876	09	South Carolina	Aiken	

== North Carolina ==
- "Four murders, 30 whippings, and 16 other horrible outrages" (1871, Alamance County)

== See also ==
- Pulaski riot
- Kirk–Holden war
- Black suffrage in the United States
- Enforcement Acts
- Freedmen's Bureau
- Ku Klux Klan § First Klan: 1865–1871
- Red Shirts (United States)
- Lynching in the United States
- Reconstruction Amendments
- Nadir of American race relations
  - Wilmington massacre (1898)
  - Red Summer of 1919
  - Ocoee massacre (1920)
- Murders of Chaney, Goodman, and Schwerner (1964)
- Orangeburg massacre (1968)
- List of massacres in the United States
- Mass racial violence in the United States
- List of disasters in the United States by death toll
