= Millican massacre =

1868 massacre of Black freedmen in Texas

Coordinates: 30.4714°N 96.2041°W

- Part of Reconstruction era racial violence
- Location: Millican, Texas, Brazos County, Texas, United States
- Date: July 15–17, 1868
- Target: Black freedmen
- Attack type: Massacre, racial violence, freedmen massacre
- Deaths: 5–150 Black people killed; up to 300 killed or driven away
- Injuries: Unknown
- Victims: Black residents and freedmen in and near Millican
- Perpetrator: White residents of Brazos County

The Millican massacre was a freedmen massacre that took place from July 15 to July 17, 1868, in and near Millican, Brazos County, Texas, during Reconstruction. The violence followed rising tensions between white residents and formerly enslaved African Americans after the Civil War, including disputes over labor, political rights and armed self-defense.

Estimates of the death toll vary. The Equal Justice Initiative lists the massacre among Reconstruction-era racial terror attacks and estimates that 150 Black people were killed in Millican in July 1868. Texas A&M University has described the event as killing or driving away up to 300 Black residents and as "the worst incident of racial violence in Texas during Reconstruction."

== Background ==
Before the Civil War, Brazos County had a mixed agricultural economy that included small farms and larger plantations. In 1860, the county had 1,713 white residents and 1,063 enslaved Black residents. The arrival of the Houston and Texas Central Railway made Millican a transportation center, and during the Civil War it served as an important shipping point for the Confederacy.

Federal troops arrived in Millican in June 1865. During Reconstruction, Black residents and white landowners in Brazos County clashed over labor contracts, political power and social relations. Agents of the Freedmen's Bureau, sometimes supported by federal soldiers, attempted to mediate disputes. Black children attended school for the first time in Millican and at Wilson's Plantation, while interracial violence became more common in the county.

The Ku Klux Klan first appeared in Brazos County in June 1868, when masked men paraded through a Black neighborhood in Millican. The incident caused Black residents to fear retaliation and begin drilling and organizing for self-defense.

== Massacre ==
The violence began after a rumor spread that Miles Brown, a Black freedman, had been killed near the farm of Andrew Holliday. A Freedmen's Bureau report said George E. Brooks, a Black preacher, directed Harry Thomas to gather men to search for Brown's body. Thomas assembled about 30 men and marched through Millican in military formation. The group was later joined by about 20 more men near the Brazos River bottom.

Holliday sent word to town that armed Black men had surrounded his house and threatened to hang him. About 30 armed white residents then went toward Holliday's farm, accompanied by Deputy Sheriff Patillo and Mayor G. A. Wheat. The two groups met at a bend in the road, where shots were fired. The report said white witnesses claimed Black men fired first, while a wounded freedman said Holliday fired first. After the first shot, the report said, "a general firing commenced from the Whites," and the Black men scattered.

The fighting continued over several days. Contemporary reports often described the event as a "riot," but later historians and researchers have described it as a massacre because the victims were Black freedpeople and the violence helped destroy Black political and civil rights in the area.

The Freedmen's Bureau report identified Harry Thomas as the leader of the freedmen who were killed in the first confrontation. It also listed Hayes Hardy, King Holiday, Dan Zephyr and George E. Brooks among the dead or presumed dead, while noting other wounded or missing freedmen. Brooks, a preacher and community leader, was later found dead. The report described his killing as "the most outrageous character" and said white residents had long held "great antipathy" toward him, which the report attributed to prejudice rather than evidence.

== Death toll ==
The number of people killed remains disputed. A Freedmen's Bureau report from shortly after the massacre listed five Black men killed, one wounded and one wounded and missing. Other contemporary and later accounts gave higher numbers, and the massacre has since been remembered as one of the largest episodes of racial violence in Texas during Reconstruction. The Equal Justice Initiative estimates that 150 Black people were killed, while Texas A&M University says up to 300 Black residents were killed or driven away.

== Legacy ==
The massacre received attention in newspapers outside Brazos County at the time, but it later became little known outside local and scholarly discussions. Texas A&M University professor Amy Earhart and students at the university have worked to document the massacre through archival research, oral history and a digital humanities project.

A historical marker commemorating the massacre was later placed in Millican. KBTX reported in 2026 that the marker stands on FM 159 north of Webster Street.
