= Victor Lacroix =

Victor Lacroix (died 1866) was a Creole of color from New Orleans who served in the Union Army during the American Civil War and died in the New Orleans massacre of 1866. He was the son of wealthy property owner, tailor, and Creole of color François Lacroix.

Poems of tribute were published in the New Orleans Tribune including one with a stanza noting Lacroix. After his death a séance was held and the medium reported that Lacroix sought a continued push for civil rights.

Four years before his death, Lacroix married Sarah Brown, a white woman, in a religious ceremony at St. Alphonse Church. Civil law prohibited such a marriage until 1868, two years after his death. In a contestation of Lacroix's will, Brown gave testimony that she did not realize her husband was a man of color until after they were wed. Ultimately, a filing deadline was missed and her case was denied. She and her two young children with Lacroix were provided for by her father-in-law, François.
