= 3rd United States Colored Heavy Artillery Regiment =

Military unit, American Civil War

3rd Regiment Heavy Artillery U.S. Colored Troops
- Active: 1863–1866
- Country: United States
- Allegiance: United States Union
- Branch: Artillery; United States Colored Troops
- Size: Regiment
- Engagements: American Civil War

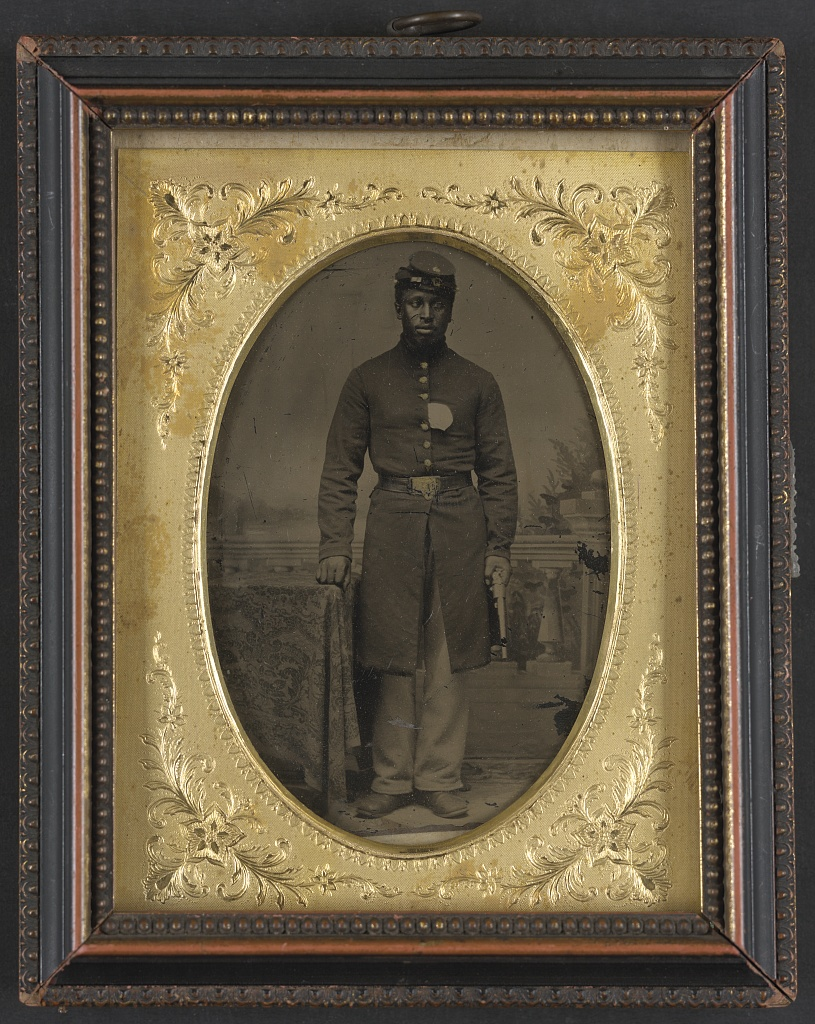
Sergeant Tom Strawn of Company B, 3rd U.S. Colored Troops USCT Heavy Artillery Regiment (Library of Congress)

The 3rd Regiment, United States Colored Heavy Artillery was a regiment of African-American troops recruited from Tennessee that served in the Union Army during the American Civil War.

== Colored troops artillery ==
In the Civil War, heavy artillery referred to gun crews based within fixed fortifications, rather than "light artillery" which was drawn by horses and deployed in the field during battles. Artillery regiments were divided into companies, called batteries, and each battery fielded up to 6 guns. The majority of US Colored Troops artillery units, such as the 3rd Regiment, were heavy artillery units based at forts.

== Unit history ==
The Regiment was first organized in June 1863 at Memphis and Fort Pickering, Tennessee, and was originally called the 1st Regiment Tennessee Heavy Artillery, African Descent. The name was changed to the 2nd Regiment Heavy Artillery U.S. Colored Troops on March 11, 1864, and then to the 3rd Regiment on April 26. The 3rd Regiment mainly served on garrison duty at Fort Pickering, which guarded the approach to Memphis along the Mississippi River. A magazine at the fort manned by the Regiment's Battery A exploded at on September 24, 1864, killing two and injuring four.

The regiment was mustered out of service on April 26, 1866. Many of the soldiers and their families lived in a slum area surrounding Fort Pickering. In May 1866, a confrontation between discharged Black soldiers and local police turned into a race riot when a white mob attacked the neighborhood where the soldiers lived. During these Memphis riots of 1866, 46 Black people were killed, including 13 Black veterans, many from the 3rd Heavy artillery.

== Commanding officers ==
US Colored Troops regiments in the Civil War were led by white officers.
Commanding officers of the 3rd Regiment Heavy Artillery U.S. Colored Troops:

- Col. Ignatz G. Kappner
- Lt. Col. Edward R. Wiley

== See also ==
- List of United States Colored Troops Civil War units
