= Augustus Robin =

New Orleans engraver

Augustus Robin (1822 – December 3, 1898) was an engraver and the "premier portraitist in New Orleans". His parents were French and he was born in New York. Robin moved to New Orleans in 1838. He worked there, in Philadelphia, and back in New York. In New York City, Robin worked for John Chester Buttre. He died in New York City and was interred at Green-Wood Cemetery on December 6, 1898.
