= Joseph Jones =

Joseph Jones may refer to:

== Academics ==
- Joseph Endom Jones (1850–1922), Baptist minister and professor
- Joseph Marion Jones (1908–1990), U.S. State Department official and academic
- Joseph Jay Jones (1908–1999), professor of English at University of Texas
- Joseph R. Jones, researcher on bullying in educational environments

== Arts and literature ==
- Joseph Stevens Jones (1809–1877), Boston actor, playwright and theater manager
- Joseph David Jones (1827–1870), Welsh composer and schoolmaster
- Joseph David-Jones (born 1993), American actor
- Jim Jones (rapper) (Joseph Jones, born 1976), American rapper from Harlem

== Business and industry ==
- Joseph Jones (ironmaster) (1837–1912), industrialist and mayor of Wolverhampton
- Joseph T. Jones (1842–1916), American oil producer
- Joseph Jones (trade unionist) (1891–1948), British coal miner

== Law and politics ==
- Joseph Jones (North Carolina politician), American 18th-century revolutionary
- Joseph Jones (Virginia politician) (1727–1805), U.S. statesman, delegate to the Continental Congress
- Joseph Russell Jones (1823–1909), American merchant and politician
- Joseph Vernon Jones (1834–1912), Wisconsin state legislator
- Joseph Merrick Jones (1902–1963), American lawyer
- Joseph E. Jones (1914–2003), Wisconsin state legislator
- J. Charles Jones (1937–2019), American civil rights leader, attorney and co-founder of SNCC

== Sports ==
- Joseph Jones (footballer) (1880–?), English footballer
- Joseph Jones (rugby) (1899–1960), rugby union and rugby league footballer of the 1920s and 1930s
- Joseph Jones (wrestler) (born 1957), American professional wrestler
- Joseph Jones (basketball) (born 1986), American basketball player
- Joseph Jones (American football) (born 1994), linebacker

== Others ==
- Joseph Bolitho Jones (1826–1900), English Convict and Western Australia's best-known bushranger

== See also ==
- Joe Jones (disambiguation)
- Joey Jones (disambiguation)
