= Swing Around the Circle =

1866 speaking campaign by US President Andrew Johnson

- Photograph of U.S. President Andrew Johnson at a banquet in his honor during the Swing Around the Circle speaking tour. Johnson appears seated in the center, with General Ulysses S. Grant to his left and Secretary of the Navy Gideon Welles to his right; the exact date has been questioned based on Ulysses S. Grant appearing to wear three-star insignia, although he was promoted to four-star General of the Army on 25 July 1866
- Date: August 27 - September 15, 1866; 160 years ago
- Type: Whistle-stop train tour
- Participants: Andrew Johnson, Ulysses Grant, Gideon Welles, William Seward, George Armstrong Custer

Swing Around the Circle is the nickname for a speaking campaign undertaken by U.S. President Andrew Johnson between August 27 and September 15, 1866, in which he tried to gain support for his obstructionist Reconstruction policies and for his preferred candidates (mostly Democrats) in the forthcoming midterm Congressional elections. The tour's nickname came from the route that the campaign took: "Washington, D.C., to New York, west to Chicago, south to St. Louis, and east through the Ohio River valley back to the nation's capital".

Johnson undertook the speaking tour in the face of increasing opposition in the Northern United States and in Washington to his lenient form of Reconstruction in the Southern United States, which had led the Southern states largely to revert to the social system that had predominated before the American Civil War. Although he believed he could regain the trust of moderate Northern Republicans by exploiting tensions between them and their Radical counterparts on the tour, Johnson only alienated them more. This caused a supporter of Johnson to say of the tour that it would have been better "had it never been made." Critics simultaneously derided the tour as boring and irrelevant and as a platform for showcasing Johnson's weaknesses: "ill-tempered, illiterate, semi-insane, and thoroughly undignified." The tour eventually became the centerpiece of the tenth article of impeachment against Johnson.

== Background ==
Andrew Johnson had first intended his approach to Reconstruction as a delivery of predecessor Abraham Lincoln's promise to benevolently "bind up the nation's wounds" after the war was won. However, as Congress began enacting legislation to guarantee the rights of former slaves, former slaveowner Johnson refocused on actions (including vetoes of civil rights legislation and mass pardoning of former Confederate officials) that resulted in severe oppression of freed slaves in the Southern states, as well as the return of high-ranking Confederate officials and pre-war aristocrats to power in state and federal government. The policies had infuriated the Radical Republicans in Congress and gradually alienated the moderates, who along with Democrats had been Johnson's base of congressional support, to the point that by 1866 the Congress had gathered enough antipathy towards the President to enact the first override of a Presidential veto in over twenty years, salvaging a bill that extended the life of the Freedmen's Bureau. Johnson also managed to alienate his own cabinet, three members of which resigned in disgust in 1866.

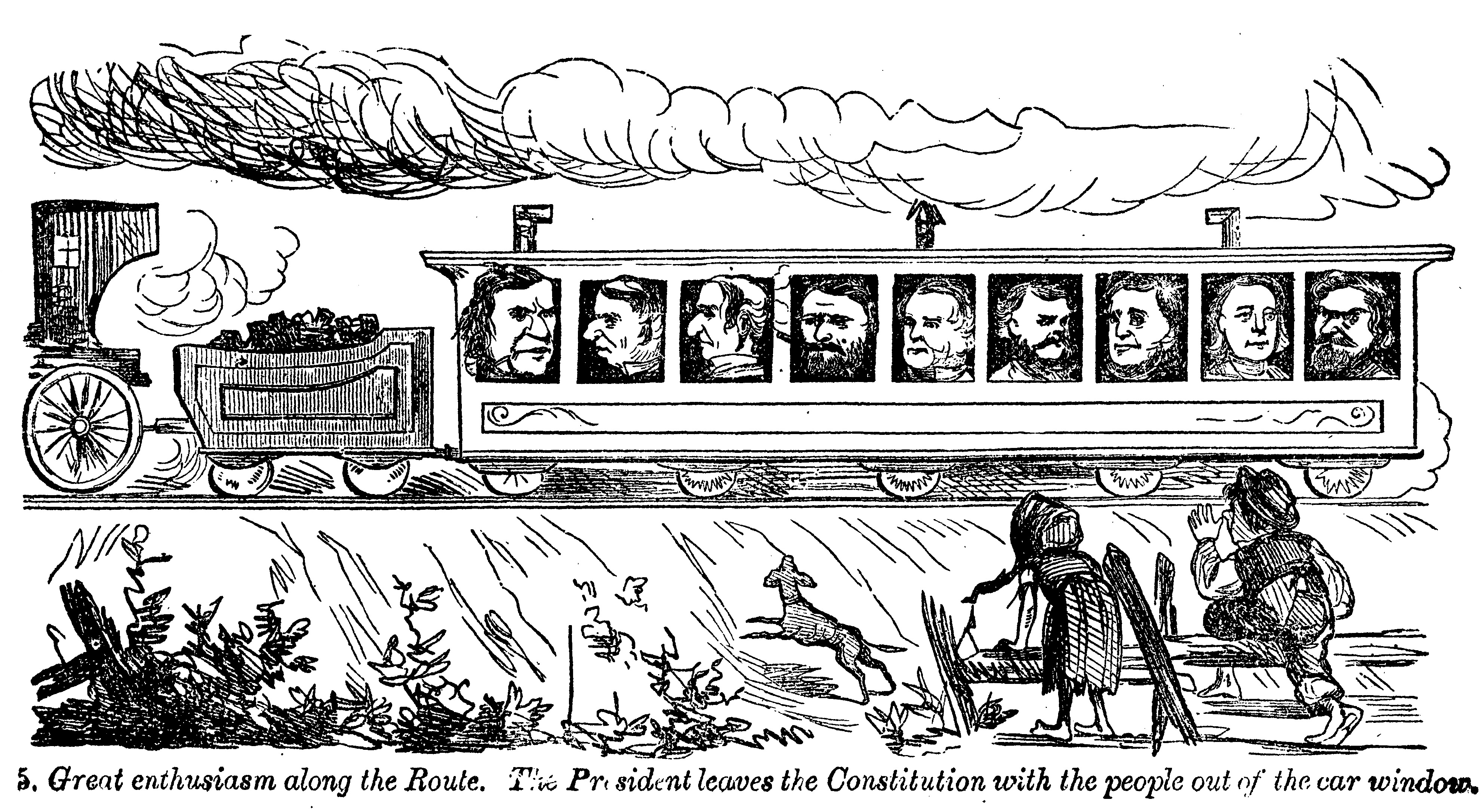
Illustration from Swingin' Round the Cirkle, or Andy's trip to the West by Petroleum V. Nasby: (1) Andrew Johnson, (2) ?, (3) William H. Seward(??), (4) Gen. Ulysses S. Grant, (5) Adm. David Farragut, (6) ?, (7) Gideon Welles(??), (8) ?, (9) ?

Thus the elections that year were viewed as a referendum on Johnson himself, who had not been elected president but had acceded to power upon Lincoln's murder. However, in Johnson's earlier political campaigns he had earned a reputation as a masterful stump speaker, and to that end he determined to undertake a political speaking tour (which at that time was unprecedented for a sitting president). His two dedicated supporters in the cabinet, Secretary of State William H. Seward and Navy Secretary Gideon Welles, joined him on the tour. In addition, to increase both his audience and his prestige, Johnson brought along heroes of the American Civil War such as David Farragut, George Custer, and Ulysses S. Grant (by then the most admired living man in the country) to stand next to him while he spoke. Also present were Generals James B. Steedman, George Crook, and Lovell Rousseau. According to historian James Ford Rhodes, "Grant's invitation came in the shape of an order as presumably did Farragut's."

One problem that would affect the tour was the difference between the impression that Johnson made on his hearers and the impression that his speeches made on those who merely read them afterward:

Mr. Johnson's manner in delivering public speeches was one which could not be translated into newspaper language. He had a calm, assured way of talking which gave the most startling remarks authority. His bearing was quiet and dignified, his voice low and sympathetic. He had one of the best voices for public speaking that I have ever heard. It was singularly penetrating; he could make it carry to the edge of the largest gathering without effort. Yet it was always a pleasant voice. I have been startled myself to read the same speech in the paper that I had heard the day before. One would think, from what was written, that a violent demagogue was brandishing his arms and shrieking at the top of his lungs.

Another problem was that semi-literate Johnson never prepared much for speeches; he was a free-wheeling stump speaker who put on a show for the audience on hand using a chain of grievances as the framework for his performance. However, the rapport that he often found with audiences in Tennessee and Washington, D.C. failed him on the tour: "the repetitions became grotesque, the variations hollow and mechanical".

== Tour ==
=== Initial success ===
In the 18 days of the tour, Johnson and his entourage made stops in Baltimore, Maryland; Philadelphia, Pennsylvania; New York City, West Point, Albany, Auburn, Niagara Falls, and Buffalo, New York; Cleveland and Toledo, Ohio; Detroit, Michigan; Chicago, Springfield, and Alton, Illinois; St. Louis, Missouri; Indianapolis, Indiana; Louisville, Kentucky; Cincinnati and Columbus, Ohio; and Pittsburgh and Harrisburg, Pennsylvania, as well as short stops in smaller towns between.

Because Presidents had traditionally not undertaken political campaigning in the past, Johnson's action was seen even before he began as undignified and beneath the office. Johnson's advisors, aware that the President could get carried away in his own sentiments, pleaded with him to give only carefully prepared speeches; Johnson, as he had often done on the campaign trail, instead prepared a rough outline around which he could spontaneously speak.

Initially, Johnson was enthusiastically received, particularly in Baltimore, Philadelphia, and New York. According to Johnson biographer Hans Trefousse, at each stop on the tour he had delivered

[...] substantially the same speech, in which he thanked his audience for its welcome, paid homage to the army and navy, and declared that the humble individual standing before them had not changed. His views were the same he had held during the war, and he still favored the preservation of the Union of the states. Generally recounting his rise from the tailor's bench to the presidency, he compared himself to Jesus Christ and explained that like the Savior, he, too, liked to pardon repentant sinners. But Congress, and especially Thaddeus Stevens and the radicals, still wanted to break up the Union, an effort he was trying to prevent.

The press nonetheless gave him overwhelmingly positive coverage throughout the first leg of the tour (although the circumstances made his customary introduction—"Fellow citizens, it is not for the purpose of making speeches that I now appear before you"—a particular laugh line). However, when Johnson entered the Radical Republican strongholds of the Midwest, he began facing much more hostile crowds, some drawn by reports of his prior speeches and others organized by Republican leadership in those towns. Overall, Unionists and Radical Republicans did not respond well to the President's performances. For example, according to the writer from the Missouri Democrat in the September 10 issue:

[Johnson's tone of voice was] sneering, sarcastic, and malignant whenever he referred to the Freedmen's Bureau, to Congress ... or to impartial suffrage; defiant and revolutionary when he talked of the vote; boastful and triumphant when he spoke of having "turned loose" over 40,000 of captured rebels; intensely and over poweringly egotistic at all times. His favorite beginning for a sentence was "Yes," sounded like something about half way between "Yeas," and "yahs," in a drawling manner and loud, harsh tone, and no words can express the sheer, dogmatic, and insufferably self-satisfied meaning which he threw into it. He spoke very deliberately, apparently weighing the effect of every word.

=== Disaster ===
Johnson's stop in Cleveland on September 3 marked the turning point in the tour. Because the audience was as large as it had been at previous stops, nothing seemed out of the ordinary; however, the crowd included mobs of hecklers, many of them plants by the Radical Republicans, who goaded Johnson into engaging them in mid-speech; when one of them yelled "Hang Jeff Davis!" in Cleveland, Johnson angrily replied, "Why don't you hang Thad Stevens and Wendell Phillips?" According to a history of Cleveland, "The city was filled with people; flags and bunting were profuse, and a brilliant reception awaited the distinguished party at the Kennard House. The President's speech, however, from the hotel balcony, was frequently interrupted by the assembled crowd, and his criticisms of Congress were met by jeers and hooting. Epithets were bandied back and forth between the crowd and the speaker. Uncomplimentary references to his political deeds were shouted out, to which he retorted by hints at 'Northern traitors' and a sweeping denunciation of those before him. The meeting was boisterous and disgraceful, and neither the President nor the crowd was appeased by it."

When he left the balcony from which he had spoken, reporters heard supporters reminding Johnson to maintain his dignity; Johnson's reply of "I don't care about my dignity" was carried in newspapers across the nation, abruptly ending the tour's favorable press.

Subsequent to this and other vituperative appearances in southern Michigan, the Illinois governor Richard J. Oglesby refused to attend Johnson's September 7 Chicago stop, as did the Chicago city council. Johnson nonetheless fared well in Chicago, presenting only a short and pre-written speech. However, his temper got the better of him once more in St. Louis on September 9. Provoked by a heckler, Johnson accused Radical Republicans of deliberately inciting the deadly New Orleans Riot that summer; again compared himself to Jesus, and the Republicans to his betrayers; and defending himself against unmade accusations of tyranny. The following day in Indianapolis, the crowd was so hostile and loud that Johnson was unable to speak at all; even after he retreated, violence and gunfire broke out in the streets between Johnson supporters and opponents, resulting in one man's death.

At other points in Kentucky, Ohio, and Pennsylvania, spectators drowned out Johnson with calls for Grant, who refused to speak, and for "Three cheers for Congress!"

After the honeymoon period early in his tour, Johnson found the Radicals in his audiences increasingly vocal. The give-and-take discussion he envisioned before leaving the White House proved impossible when on warm September evenings huge crowds gathered under hotel balconies under conditions of high tension and excitement. Taking advantage of the anonymity granted by the hour and the crowd, Radical sympathizers unmercifully heckled the President...Repeatedly Johnson let himself be carried away by the occasion. His Cleveland and St. Louis speeches approach the ultimate in audience adaptation as the situation—balcony, gas lights, torches, noisy crowd drew him into long and contentious speeches. His topics were forced upon him by friendly and unfriendly calls from the crowd. Warming to his subject and faced by an audience willing and anxious to talk back, he could not admit defeat and leave his audience without a full defense of his policies.

— Gregg Phifer, "Not for the purpose of making a speech:" Andrew Johnson's Swing Around the Circle (1954)

=== Tragedy ===
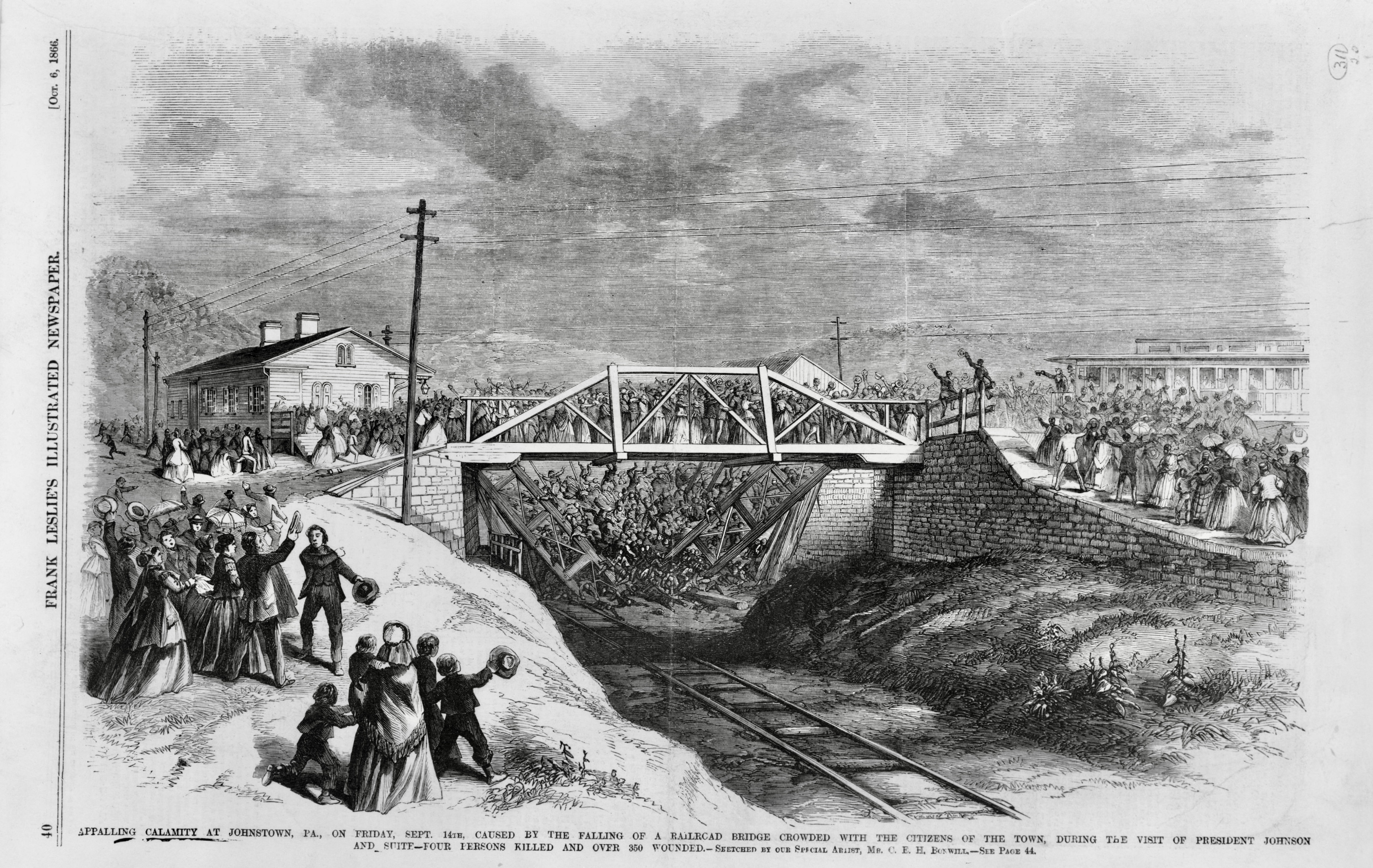
"Appalling calamity at Johnstown, Pa., on Friday, Sept. 14th, caused by the falling of a railroad bridge crowded with the citizens of the town, during the visit of President Johnson" (Frank Leslie's Illustrated Newspaper, Oct. 6, 1866)

Finally, on September 14 in Johnstown, Pennsylvania, a temporary platform built beside the railroad tracks for the president's appearance gave way, sending hundreds into a drained canal 20 feet below, killing thirteen. Though Johnson attempted to halt the train and use it for triage for the injured, it could not wait due to conflicting train traffic. A few members of the presidential party left the train to assist the victims, but Johnson and the rest of the party continued onto Harrisburg. To appearances, Johnson had callously abandoned the scene of massive casualties. Johnson gave $500 ($8,318 in 2016 dollars) to assist the victims.

== Reaction ==
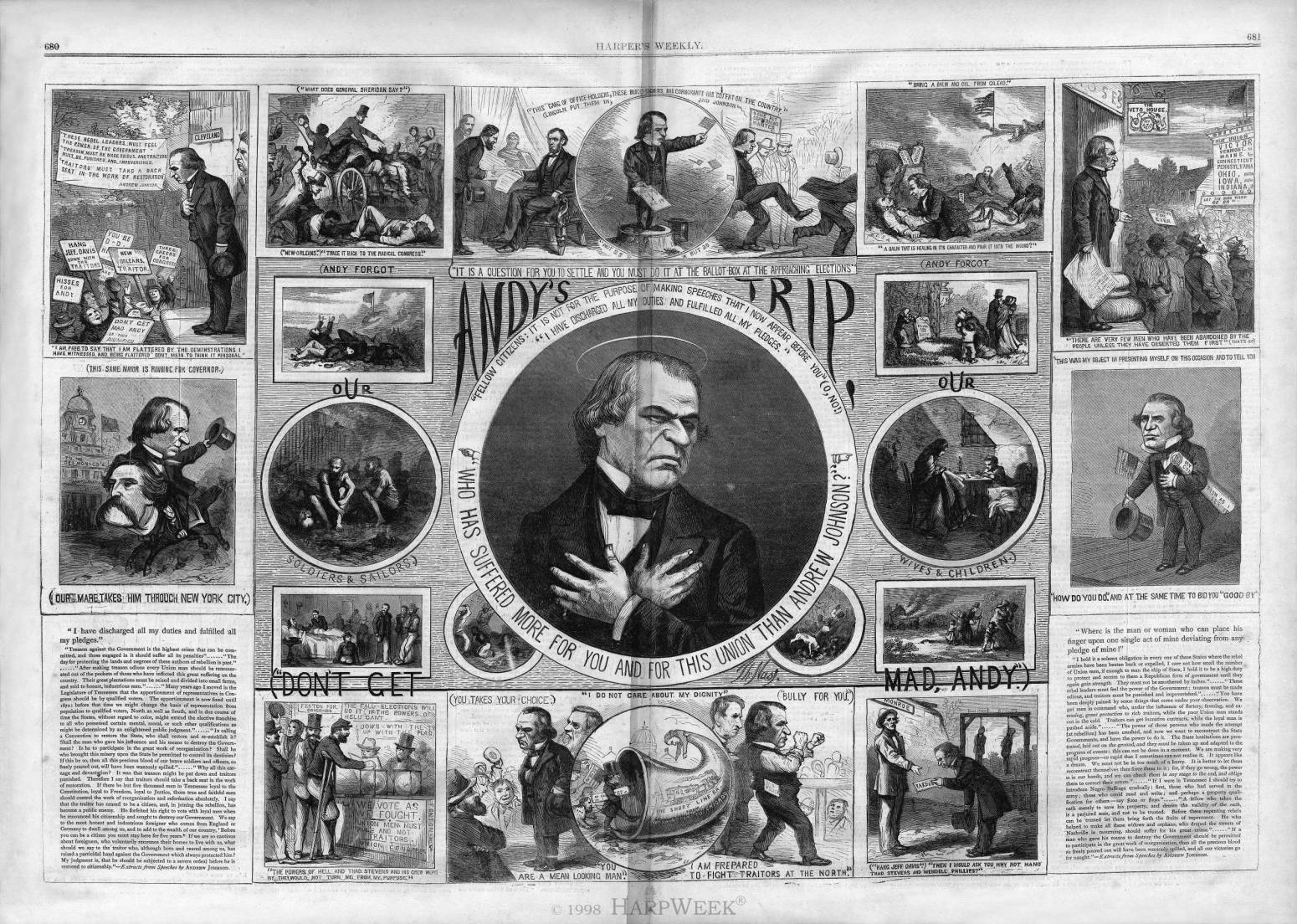
"Andy's Trip," a lampooning of Johnson's "Swing Around the Circle" campaign tour by cartoonist Thomas Nast

The press excoriated Johnson badly for his disastrous appearances and speeches. The New York Herald, previously the most supportive newspaper for Johnson in the entire country, stated that "It is mortifying to see a man occupying the lofty position of President of the United States descend from that position and join issue with those who are draggling their garments in the muddy gutters of political vituperation." The president was also the target of the two most important satirical journalists of the era—humorist David Ross Locke (writing in his persona as the backward southerner Petroleum Vesuvius Nasby) and cartoonist Thomas Nast, who created three large illustrations lampooning Johnson and the Swing that became legendary.

Johnson's Republican opponents took quick advantage of their good political fortune. Thaddeus Stevens gave a speech referring to the Swing as "the remarkable circus that traveled through the country" that "cut outside the circle and entered into street brawls with common blackguards." Charles Sumner, meanwhile, gave a stump speech of his own, encouraging his audiences to vote for Republicans in the fall elections because "the President must be taught that usurpation and apostasy cannot prevail." Johnson's supporters, too, gave negative reactions to the tour, with former Georgia Governor Herschel V. Johnson writing that the President had "[sacrificed] the moral power of his position, and done great damage to the cause of Constitutional Reorganization." James Doolittle, a Senator from Wisconsin, lamented that the tour had "cost Johnson one million northern voters."

Radical Republicans also began spreading rumors that Johnson had been drunk at several appearances. Because Johnson had been drunk at his own vice-presidential inauguration the year before, reporters and political opponents took his inebriation as fact and declared him a "vulgar, drunken demagogue who was disgracing the presidency."

== Aftermath ==
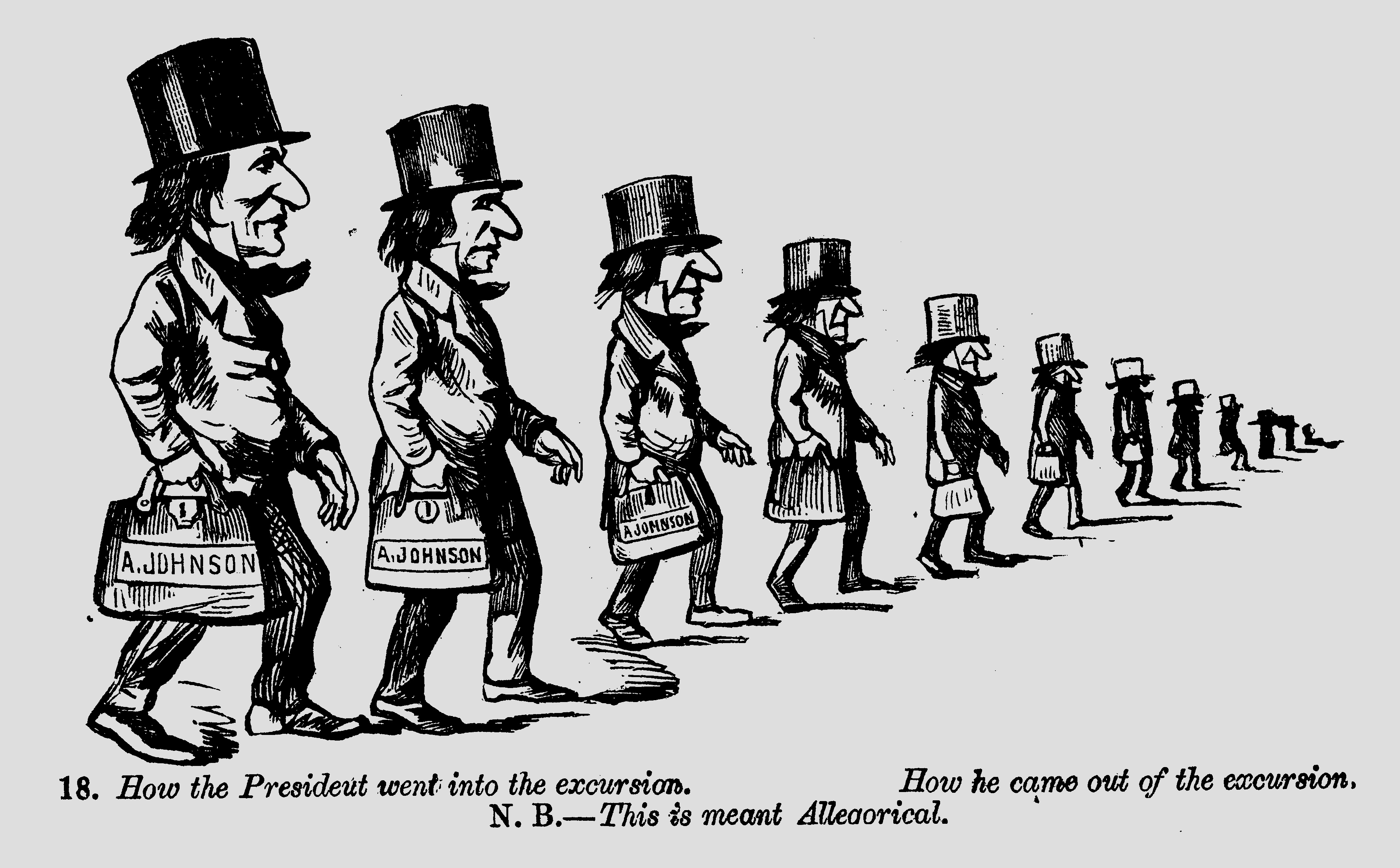
A cartoon by David Ross Locke (pen name Petroleum V. Nasby) depicting Johnson's loss of political strength as a result of his Swing Around the Circle speaking tour

By the time he returned to Washington from the speaking tour, Johnson had even less support in the North than he had started with. His only remaining allies in Congress were Southern Democrats; since these were mostly former rebels, Johnson's reputation was diminished yet further by association. The Republican party would go on to a landslide victory in the congressional elections, and the new Congress would wrest control of Reconstruction from the White House with the Reconstruction Acts of 1867.

Johnson openly defied Congress and fought them bitterly for the control of the nation's domestic policy. However, the Republicans' vastly increased congressional voting bloc not only afforded them the political power to keep Johnson at bay, it gave the party sufficient votes to attempt impeachment of Johnson, first unsuccessfully in 1867 and again successfully in 1868. The Swing Around the Circle's impact was apparent even in the articles of impeachment, with the tenth of eleven articles charging that the President "did...make and declare, with a loud voice certain intemperate, inflammatory, and scandalous harangues, and therein utter loud threats and bitter menaces, as well against Congress as the laws of the United States duly enacted thereby, amid the cries, jeers and laughter of the multitudes then assembled in hearing." The article was specifically seen as being in response to speeches delivered in Washington on August 18, Cleveland on September 3, and St. Louis on September 8, 1866. During the impeachment trial, a number of reporters and other individuals were called on April 3 and 4, during the prosecution's presentation, to testify about speeches Johnson had made, including one in Washington, D.C., on August 18, 1866 (shortly before the commencement of the Swing Around the Circle) and in Cleveland, Ohio, on September 3, 1866 (during the Swing Around the Circle). The impeachment managers neglected to bring the tenth article to a vote in the Senate when it became clear that it had insufficient support to result in a conviction.

The Republicans captured the White House in 1868 and maintained control of it until 1885, although Congress would continue to be the dominant force in government until the end of the 19th century. Thus, in effect, the Swing Around the Circle began a long series of political defeats that crippled Johnson, the Democratic Party and the presidency for several years.

== Itinerary ==
While ongoing it was known as the President's speaking tour, political tour, or electioneering tour. Indented items were brief whistle stops.

- Baltimore, Maryland – August 23
  - Havre de Grace, Maryland
  - Perrymansville, Maryland
  - Wilmington, Delaware
- Philadelphia, Pennsylvania – Continental Hotel – August 25 – "public officials refused the President an official welcome" – George Meade, head of the local military district, greeted the President
- New York City
- West Point
- Albany
- Auburn
- Niagara Falls
- Little Falls, New York – August 30(?)
- Buffalo, New York – met with Millard Fillmore
  - Ashtabula, Ohio – Ashtabula "refused the president a hearing...They laughed and talked, cheered for Grant and Farragut, and plainly showed that wanted nothing" out of Johnson.
  - Painesville, Ohio
- Cleveland – September 3 – spoke from the balcony of Kennard House; per a 1954 history of the swing, "His Cleveland audience...persisted in talking back. When the President remarked that he was there 'for the purpose of exchanging views, and ascertaining, if he could, who was wrong,' he got the answer: 'You are!' One of his favorite rhetorical questions: 'Who is he—what language does he speak—what religion does he profess that can come and place his finger upon one pledge I ever violated or one principle I ever proved false to?' provoked replies like 'New Orleans!' and 'Why don't you hang Jeff Davis?' Before long the President became angry and accused Congress of 'trying to break up the government.' Hisses and cries of 'A lie!' replied to this accusation, and one voice suggested, 'Don't get mad!'"
- Toledo, Ohio
- Detroit
- Chicago – Attended the laying of the cornerstone to a monument to Stephen Douglas; the Chicago Tribune accused him of "electioneering on behalf of rebels at the funeral for a patriot...He is, beyond all comparison, the least reputable and most brazen man that ever rose to the presidency by accident or design."
- Springfield – Mary Todd Lincoln, who despised Johnson, was offended by his visit to Lincoln's tomb, stating, "The President encountered much that would humiliate any other than himself, possessing such inordinate vanity and presumption as he does."
- Alton, Illinois
- St. Louis, Missouri – September 8 – In a private letter to his father in October 1866, one F. W. Drury of Alton, Illinois wrote: "His speech, his drunken driveling slobbering harangue at the Southern Hotel at St. Louis was the straw that broke the camels back it was the most disgusting tirade that ever emanated from any man—it would have disgraced Ben Peake, or General Pomeroy. He was drunk, drunk!"
- Indianapolis – "After a long introduction by General Sullivan Meredith, the president tried to speak, but the unruly crowd, shouting 'Shut up,' would not let him finish.
- Jeffersonville, Indiana
- Louisville, Kentucky - September 11
- Cincinnati
- Columbus, Ohio
- Pittsburgh – "public officials refused the President an official welcome"
- Altoona, Pennsylvania – According to the Chicago Tribune, which started calling the tour "jerking round the circle," at this stop Johnson said that "Reconstruction and harmony were what the nation needed; but when the work was nearly completed, we found a conflict between the Executive and the Legislative departments, and when he, the representative of the people, had attempted to restore the Union, he was declared a tyrant and a usurper. He defended his vetoes and declared he would always be found defending the people's rights.' This is clearly a new reading of the Constitution."
  - Johnstown, Pennsylvania – whistle stop? – September 14 – Johnstown, Pennsylvania platform collapse
- Harrisburg, Pennsylvania
- Baltimore (again) – Characteristic of Johnson on the tour was him saying, "I do not wish to take too much of your time" or "I'm not here to make a speech," and then making a 70-minute speech; in Baltimore he spoke so long that "his special train was delayed and Washington crowds had a long and unexpected wait at the station."

I have great confidence in the American people, all except Members of Congress, Unionists and Niggers; they are all traitors, and I mean to fight them with the help of General Grant

— Satirist David Ross Locke, as Petroleum V. Nasby, recapitulating Johnson's speeches

== See also ==
- Presidency of Andrew Johnson
- Reconstruction Era
