= Joey Jones (disambiguation) =

Joey Jones (1955–2025) is a Welsh former footballer.

Joey Jones may also refer to:

- Joey Jones (American football) (born 1962), American college football coach at the University of South Alabama
- Joey Jones (footballer, born 1994) (born 1994), English professional footballer
- Joey Jones (journalist), British journalist

== See also ==
- Joe Jones (disambiguation)
- Joseph Jones (disambiguation)
