= Joe Jones =

Joe Jones may refer to:

== Art and entertainment ==
- Joe Jones (artist) (1909–1963), American painter, muralist, and lithographer
- Jo Jones (1911–1985), American swing era jazz drummer
- Philly Joe Jones (1923–1985), American modern jazz drummer
- Joe Jones (singer) (1926–2005), American rhythm and blues singer and composer
- Joe Jones (Fluxus musician) (1934–1993), American avant-garde musician associated with Fluxus
- Boogaloo Joe Jones (born 1940), American jazz guitarist who first recorded as Joe Jones

== Sports ==
- Joe Jones (footballer) (1887–1941), Welsh international footballer who also played for Stoke, Crystal Palace and Coventry
- Joe Jones (rugby) (1916–1974), Welsh rugby union and rugby league footballer of the 1930s and 1940s
- Joe Jones (baseball) (1941–2023), American professional baseball coach and manager
- Joe Jones (cyclist) (born 1944), Canadian Olympic cyclist
- Joe Jones (defensive end) (born 1948), American football player for the NFL's Cleveland Browns
- Joe Jones (tight end) (born 1962), American football player for the NFL's Indianapolis Colts
- Joe Jones (basketball) (born 1965), current head men's basketball coach at Boston University
- Joe Jones (rugby union) (born 1995), Welsh rugby union player

== See also ==
- Joey Jones (disambiguation)
- Joseph Jones (disambiguation)
