= Kennard House =

Historic hotel in Cleveland, Ohio

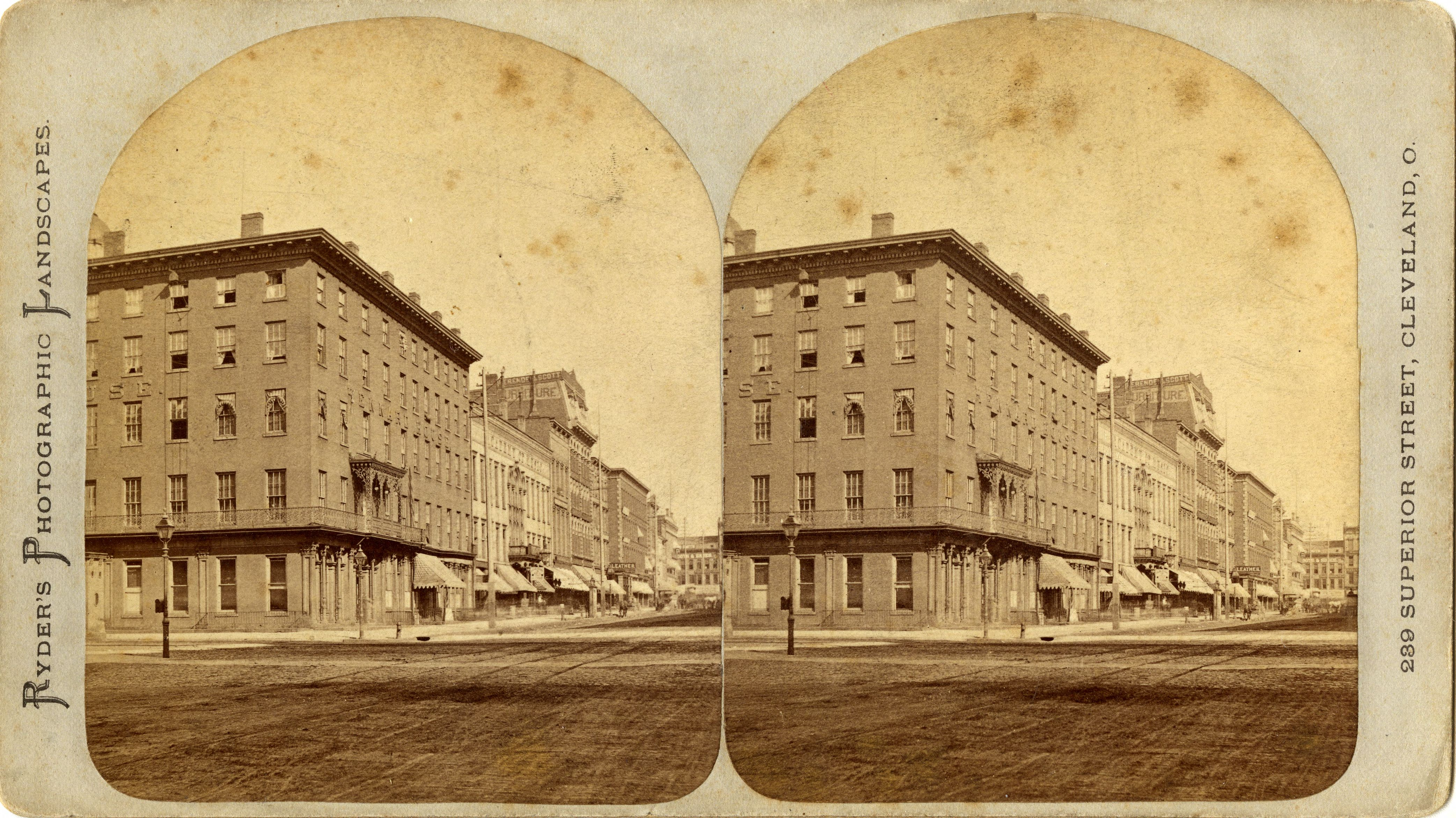
- Kennard House, Bank Street (Cleveland Public Library Digital Collections)
- Interactive map of the Kennard House area

General information
- Coordinates: 41.5°N 81.6985°W

Kennard House was a major hotel of Cleveland, Ohio, United States, in the late 19th and early 20th centuries. Originally known as Angier House, the building ended its days as the Lincoln Hotel.

== History ==
In 1852 J. C. Vaughn and Ahaz Merchant erected a large, brick, five-story hotel at the corner of St. Clair and Bank Streets, on a site formerly occupied by a log schoolhouse built in 1817. Roswell P. Angier, of Worcester, Massachusetts secured a ten-year lease on the hotel and called it the Angier House. The hotel was formally opened on April 17, 1854.

On February 11, 1864, the building was purchased by T. W. Kennard of the Atlantic and Great Western Railroad. After an extensive renovation, the newly renamed Kennard House opened to patrons on June 14, 1866. According to a history published in the 1930s, a newspaper described the hotel at the time of its reopening as Kennard House having "120 rooms, all furnished and decorated in the most sumptuous style. The ground floor is occupied by a gents furnishing store, a barbershop, a reading and commercial room, and many other accommodations. It has an elaborately decorated ceiling and a polished marble floor. In center of the hall stands a basin 18 feet in diameter...About 200 people can be seated in the dining room. The ladies' ordinary on the third floor is truly a model of comfort and luxury. It will be used as a private breakfast room and will serve 30 guests."

The Kennard House barroom was "famous" and especially popular with sportsmen. One of the most outstanding features of the hotel was the Fountain Room with a "beautiful Alhambra fountain, with a playful cupid in the center, Moorish columns supported Cupid's bower, and mirrored panels about the room reflected the exquisite fountain and the portraits of Spanish beauties which lent color and atmosphere to the room." A man named Edward Jones, said to be the "oldest colored barber" in Cleveland at the time of his death in 1906, had shaved U.S. presidents Abraham Lincoln, Andrew Johnson, and James A. Garfield as part of his work at the hotel. Johnson's politically catastrophic Swing Around the Circle speech in Cleveland in 1866 was made from the balcony of Kennard House.

In the early 20th century it became a stopover for traveling salesmen, and later became a residential apartment building. In the early 1920s, a large part of the building was converted into a clothing factory. By 1932, amidst the economic devastation of the Great Depression, the hotel's future was on decidedly wobbly footing. The local paper reported:

The hotel, once elegant center for the beauty and chivalry of this section, finally has yielded to fate. New and better hotels were built to entice trade away from the Kennard. About 10 years ago they removed from the lobby the famous tinkling fountain and the faded Spanish maidens who gazed from the walls. An electric sign on the corner prices rooms at $1 and up. Beside it is a special sign, painted on canvas, which tells part of the story: Special notice. Hotel rates reduced to meet present conditions. Daily rates are 75¢, $1, $1.25, and $1.50. Special very low weekly rates. Elegant rooms with every comfort, service and convenience. A third sign brings the story up to date. It simply says, "Closed", and explains that guests and the management have been transferred to the Hawley House.

Some part of the building was reopened by World War II; in 1942, the building's name has been changed to Lincoln Hotel and "one-third of its clientele is made up of resident guests; the rest are transients."
