= Johnstown, Pennsylvania platform collapse =

1866 disaster in the United States

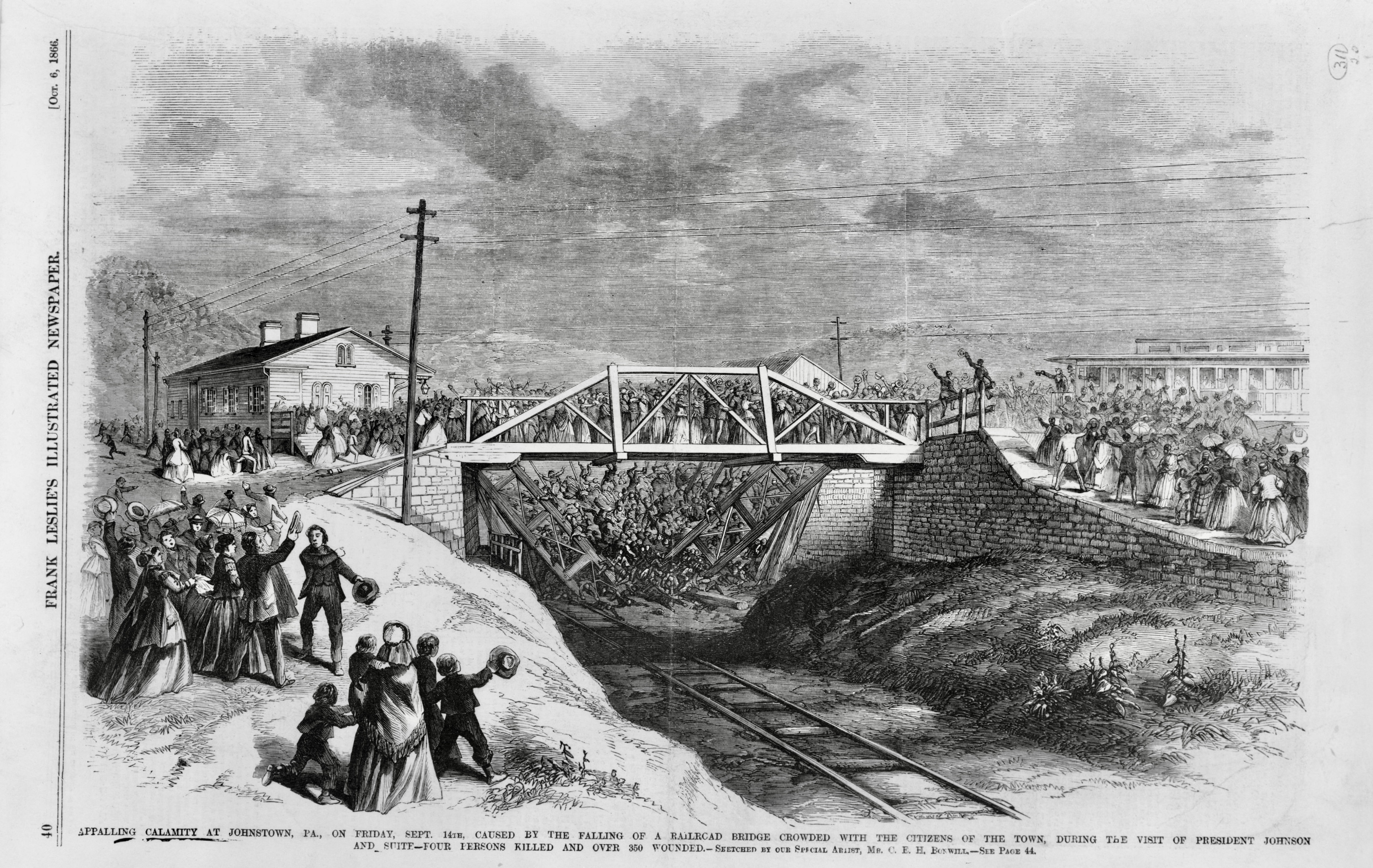
- "Appalling calamity at Johnstown, Pa., on Friday, Sept. 14th, caused by the falling of a railroad bridge crowded with the citizens of the town, during the visit of President Johnson" (Frank Leslie's Illustrated Newspaper, Oct. 6, 1866)
- Date: September 14, 1866
- Location: Johnstown, Pennsylvania, U.S.
- Type: platform collapse

The Johnstown, Pennsylvania platform collapse occurred on September 14, 1866 during President Andrew Johnson's Swing Around the Circle electioneering tour through the eastern and midwestern United States.

== Collapse ==
A temporary platform was built over the drained Pennsylvania Canal along the Pennsylvania Railroad route past the Cambria Steel Company, so that the residents of the town could greet the presidential train. By 11 a.m. that Thursday morning, some 2,000 people had gathered. Under the weight of 400-some people surging forward to see war heroes Ulysses S. Grant and David Farragut, the platform collapsed, dropping the crowd 20 ft (6.1 m) into the channel bed. According to a 1907 local history by Henry W. Storey, six people were killed and 387 people were injured. The New York Times in 1866, and 2021 Johnstown Magazine report stated that 13 were killed.

In addition to the initial drop, said to be 20 to 23 feet, "a second part of the scaffold collapsed onto the first as rescuers were attempting to assist the injured from the first collapse." Among the severely injured were the town's doctors, and some 300 people were estimated to have limb fractures and other substantial injuries.

== Responses ==
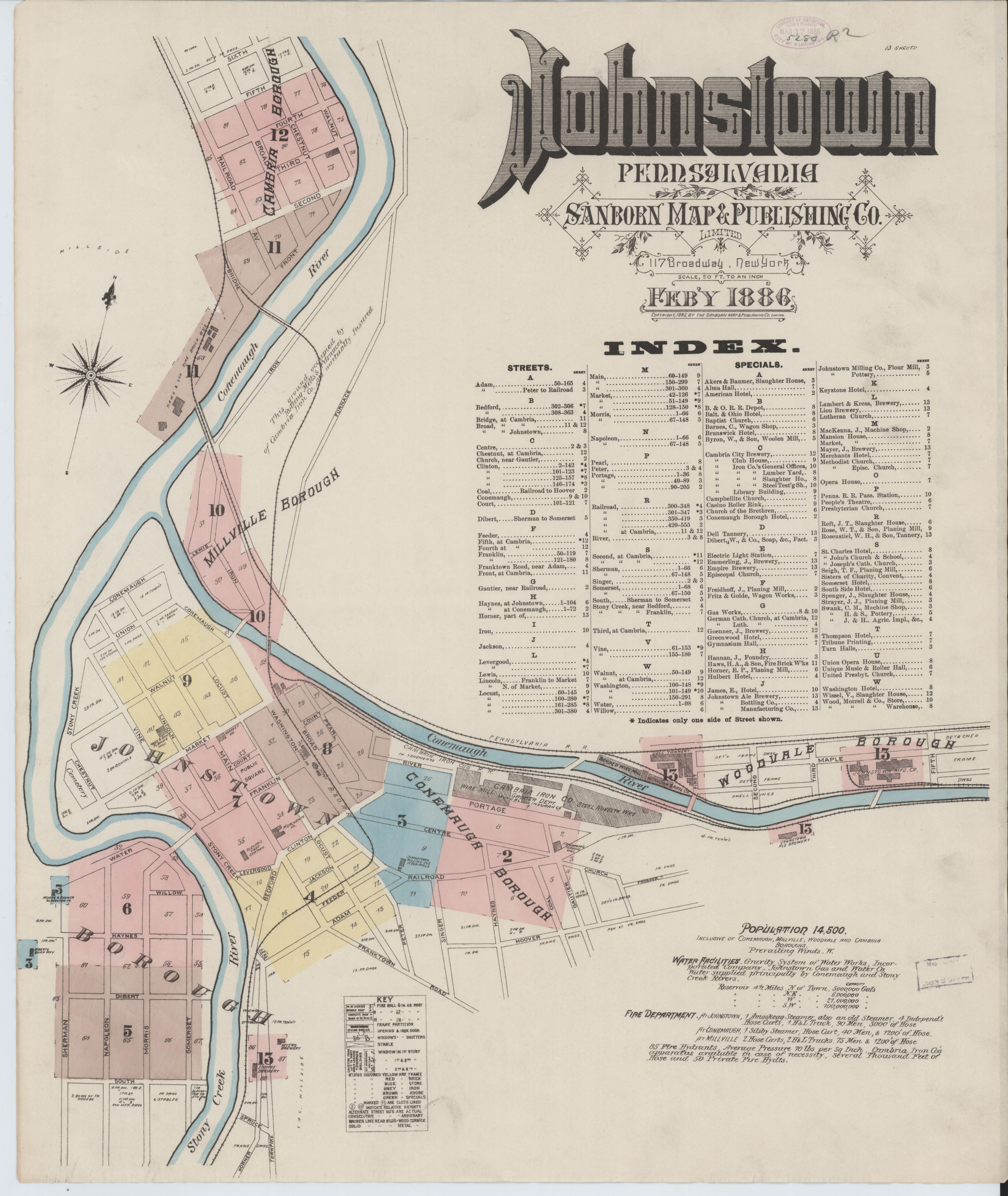
1891 Sanborn Fire Insurance Map of Johnstown, showing location of depot and tracks at that time

The train engineer insisted that the presidential train had a clear track for a limited period of prearranged time, so, leaving one aide behind to assist, Johnson's train "barely halted before heading for the Pennsylvania capital," a departure that did no favors for his already unpopular presidency. One local Republican commented that Johnson had "manifested anything but a humane feeling" by departing so quickly. Grant and George Custer were visibly horrified by the disaster, and "the 1866 tragedy weighed heavily on [Grant], and he often referred to it throughout his remaining days." Johnson donated US$500 (equivalent to $10,994 in 2025) to the relief efforts; Gen. John W. Geary donated US$200 (equivalent to $4,398 in 2025).

== See also ==
- Johnstown station
- Presidency of Andrew Johnson
