= David Ross Locke =

American journalist (1833–1888)

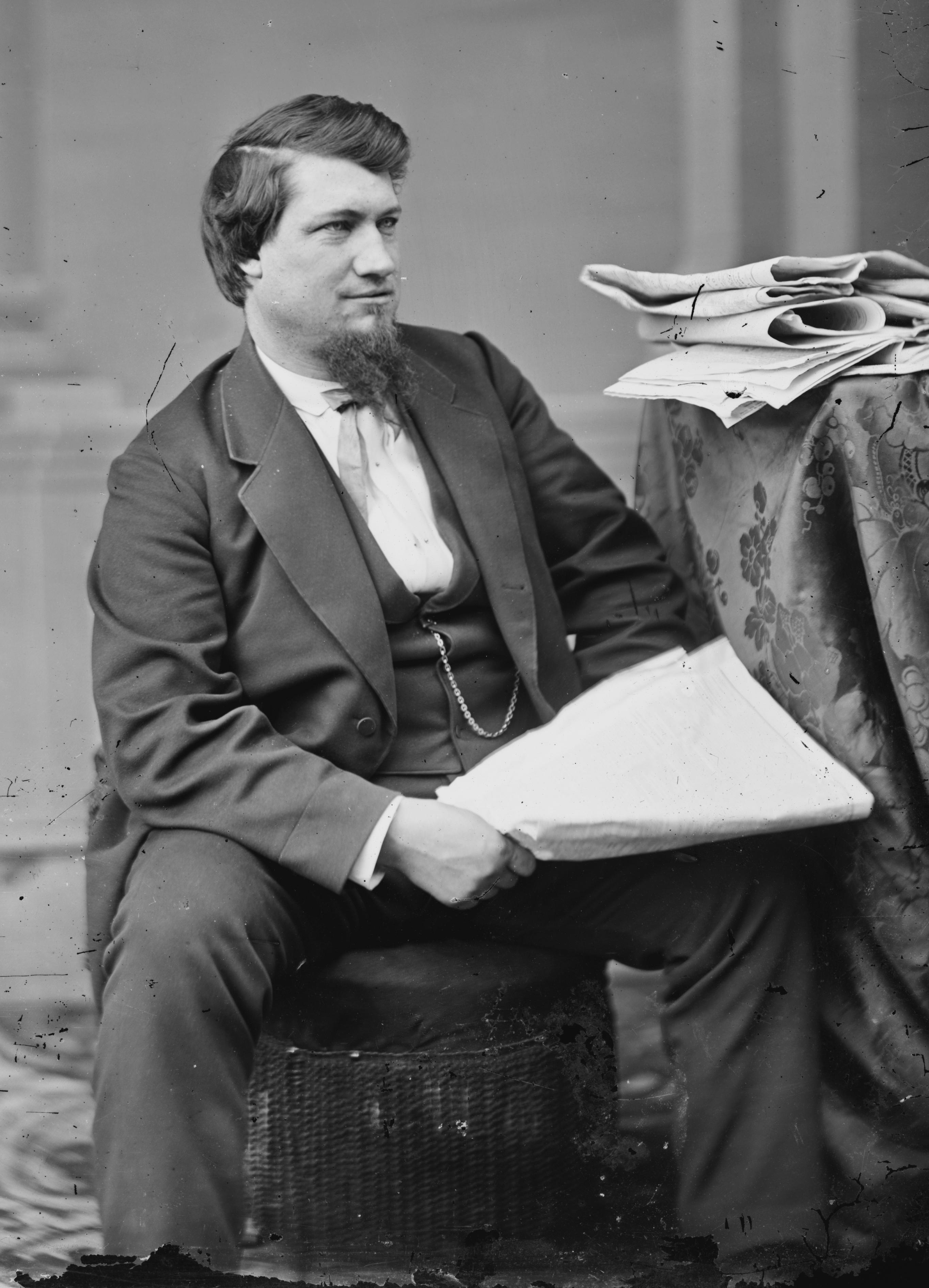
- Born: September 20, 1833; Vestal, New York, U.S.
- Died: February 15, 1888 (aged 54); Toledo, Ohio, U.S.
- Other name: Petroleum V. Nasby
- Occupation: Journalist

David Ross Locke (also known by his pseudonym Petroleum V. Nasby) (September 20, 1833 – February 15, 1888) was an American journalist and early political commentator during and after the American Civil War.

== Life and career ==
=== Early life ===
Locke was born in Vestal, New York, the son of Nathaniel Reed Locke and Hester Locke.

=== Career ===
He was apprenticed at age 12 to the Democrat in Cortland County, New York. Following a seven-year apprenticeship, he "tramped around" (meaning he was an itinerant printer) until a protracted stay with the Pittsburgh Chronicle. Around 1855, Locke started, with others, the Plymouth (Ohio) Herald.

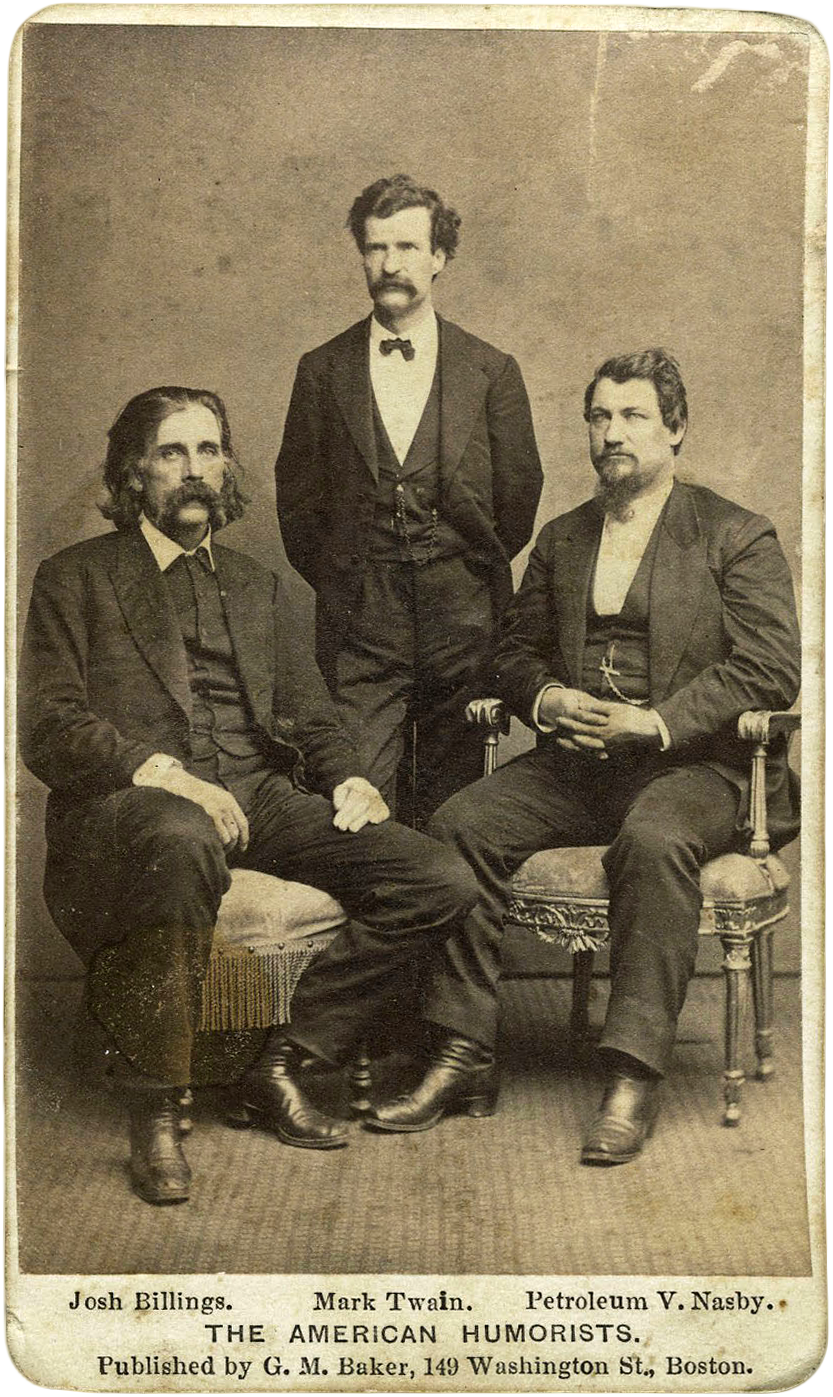
American humorists Josh Billings, Mark Twain and "Petroleum V. Nasby"

On March 20, 1856, he became the editor of the Bucyrus Journal. By 1861, he had purchased and was the editor of The Jeffersonian in Findlay, Ohio, where he began writing his Nasby letters. From October 15, 1865, he edited and wrote for the Toledo Blade in Toledo, Ohio, which he purchased in 1867.

== Nasby Letters ==
Locke's most famous works, the "Nasby Letters", were written in the character of, and over the signature of, "Rev. Petroleum V(esuvius) Nasby", a Copperhead and Democrat. Joseph Jay Jones described them as "the Civil War written in sulfuric acid."

Locke's fictional alter ego, Nasby, loudly champions the cause of the Confederate States of America from Secession onward, but does little to actively help it. After being conscripted into the Union Army he deserts to the Confederates, joining the fictional "Pelican Brigade". However, he finds life in the Confederate Army "tite nippin" and soon deserts again. By the end of the Civil War, he is back in civilian life.

The Nasby Letters, although written in the semi-literate spelling used by other humorists of the time, were a sophisticated work of ironic fiction. They were consciously intended to rally support for the Union cause; "Nasby" himself was portrayed as a thoroughly detestable character – a supreme opportunist, bigoted, work-shy, often half-drunk, and willing to say or do anything to get a Postmaster's job. (Locke's own father had served as Postmaster of Virgil, New York.)

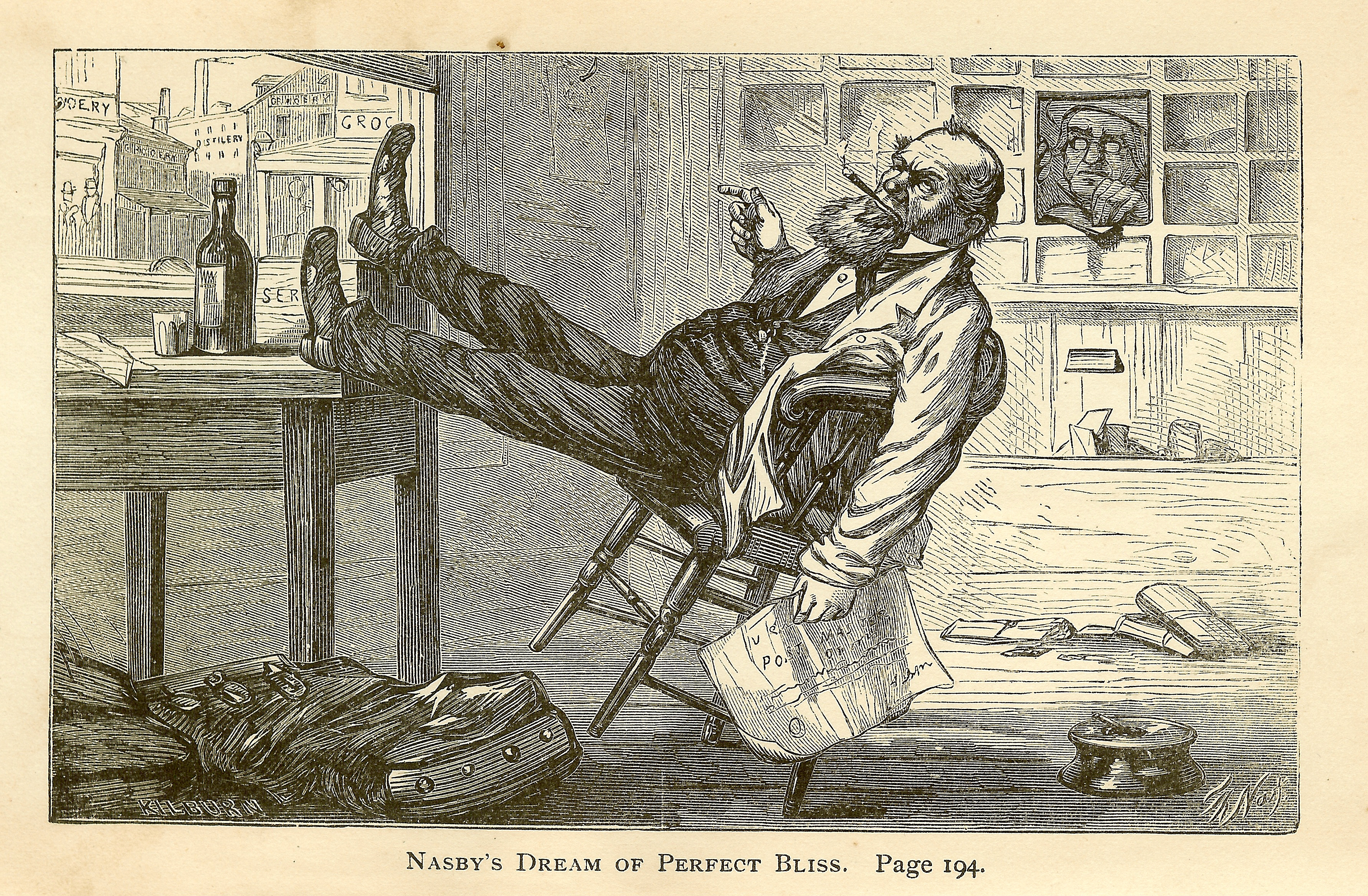
Petroleum V. Nasby's "Dream of Perfect Bliss" (a "Post Orfis" appointment) by Thomas Nast

At the time the Letters were written, postmaster positions were political plums, offering a guaranteed federal salary for relatively undemanding work. Until the glorious day when he received a "Post Orfis" from Andrew Johnson, Nasby worked, when he worked, most frequently as a preacher. His favorite biblical texts, unsurprisingly, were the ones that were used by Southern ministers to "prove" that slavery was ordained by the Bible.

Abraham Lincoln loved the Nasby Letters, quoting them frequently. Lincoln is reported to have said, "I intend to tell him if he will communicate his talent to me, I will swap places with him!". Lincoln even attempted to "initiate" the Radical Republican U.S. Senator Charles Sumner into Nasby's writing: "[L]aying aside official business for twenty minutes one day, [Lincoln] 'proceeded to read aloud, evidently enjoying it very much'" until the humorless Sumner begged off and left.

After the Civil War, Nasby wrote about Reconstruction. He settled in several different places, most notably "Confedrit X Roads, wich [sic] is in the Stait of Kentucky", a fictional town full of idle, whiskey-loving, scrounging ex-Confederates, and a few hard-working, decent folk, who by an amazing coincidence were all strong Republicans. He traveled frequently, sometimes not entirely voluntarily (Nasby's habit of borrowing money he never repaid, and running up tabs at the local saloon often made him unpopular) and continued to comment on the issues of the day.

Locke discontinued the Nasby Letters a few years before his death, since the times had changed and Nasby was no longer topical. While the semi-literate spelling in which they are written has often discouraged modern readers, it can also be seen as a point of characterizing "Nasby".

Several collections of the Letters came out in book form, some illustrated by Thomas Nast, who was a friend and political ally of Locke.

After he and Mark Twain saw an early Remington typewriter in 1874, Nasby invested in a company that controlled its sale.

== Death ==
Locke died on February 15, 1888, in Toledo.

== Works ==
- The Nasby papers: letters and sermons containing the views on the topics of the day of Petroleum V. Nasby (1864)
- Divers views, opinions, and prophecies of yoors trooly Petroleum V. Nasby (1865)
- Swingin' Round the Cirkle (1866)
- Swingin' Round the Cirkle, or Andy's trip to the West, together with a life of its hero (1866)
- Life of Androo Johnson (1866)
- Ekkoes from Kentucky (1867)
- The impendin crisis uv the Dimocracy, bein a breef and concise statement uv the past experience, present condishun and fucher hopes uv the Dimokratic party; incloodin the most prominent reesons why evry Dimokrat who loves his party shood vote for Seemore and Blare, and agin Grant and Colfax (1868)
- The struggles (social, financial and political) of Petroleum V. Nasby ... embracing his trials and troubles, ups and downs, rejoicings and wailings, likewise his views of men and things; together with the lectures "Cussed be Canaan," "The struggles of a conservative with the woman question," and "In search of a man of sin" (1872)
- The Moral History of America’s Life-Struggle (1874), illustrated by Thomas Nast.
- Eastern fruit on western dishes; The morals of Abou Ben Adhem (1875)
- Inflation at the cross roads being a history of the rise and fall of the Onlimited Trust and Confidence Company of Confedrit X roads, in a series of five letters (1875)
- A Paper City (1878)
- The Democratic John Bunyan being eleven dreams (1880)
- Hannah Jane(1881), a sentimental poem
- Nasby in exile: or, six months of travel in England, Ireland, Scotland, France, Germany, Switzerland and Belgium, with many things not of travel (1882)
- The demagogue, a political novel (1890)
- The Nasby letters. Being the original Nasby letters (1893)
- Petroleum V. Nasby on silver. (1896)
- Civil War Letters of Petroleum V. Nasby, compiled with an introduction by Harvey S. Ford (1962)

== See also ==
- Seba Smith
