= Joseph Merrick Jones =

American lawyer

Joseph Merrick Jones (August 20, 1902 – March 11, 1963) was an American lawyer from New Orleans, Louisiana. He served as Assistant Secretary for Public Affairs in the U.S. State Department at the close of World War II, and was for many years the president of the Board of Tulane University.

Jones graduated from Tulane and was admitted to the bar. He built a successful law practice in New Orleans as the senior partner of Jones, Flanders & Waechter. In 1937 the firm reorganized and eventually became Jones, Walker, Waechter, Poitevent, Carrère & Denègre L.L.P.

In 1942, the law practice was set aside temporarily as a number of associates joined the armed services. Jones was too old to enlist, but went to work in the state department. His gift for analysis and abilities as a speech writer let to his appointment as Assistant Secretary in 1946. He became an active supporter of the Marshall Plan, writing parts of speeches for Dean Acheson, George Marshall, and Harry S. Truman. Jones left federal service in 1948 and returned to Louisiana and the practice of law.

He was a fellow of Yale University's Department of Political Science, an editor of Fortune, and a special consultant to the United Nations.

In 1947 Jones had joined the board of Administrators of the Tulane Educational Fund. He became its president and served there for the rest of his life. In early 1963 he announced that Tulane would admit black students, beginning in the spring semester. He and his wife were killed when fire swept their home in Metairie, Louisiana soon after. Arson was suspected but never proven.
