= Joey Jones (journalist) =

British journalist

Joey Jones is a British chef and journalist who was Deputy Political Editor of Sky News.

He was educated at Jesus College, Oxford where he read History and English. He previously reported for BBC Radio Devon and Euronews.

In 2015, he left Sky News in order to become a Press Advisor in the Technological industry In May 2016, Jones was appointed as the official spokesman for Conservative MP Theresa May. In September 2016, he joined Weber Shandwick and became their new head of public affairs, replacing David Skelton.
