= Joseph Marion Jones =

Joseph Marion Jones (October 29, 1908 – August 9, 1990) served in the United States Department of State in the late 1940s.

As Special Assistant to the Assistant Secretary for Public Affairs he was responsible for drafting Undersecretary of State Dean Acheson's speech before the Delta Council on May 8, 1947.

Jones published his memoirs in 1955, entitling them "The Fifteen Weeks: February 21 - June 5 1947". These chronicled his part in the development of the Truman Doctrine and the Marshall Plan.
