= Joseph R. Jones =

American author and academic

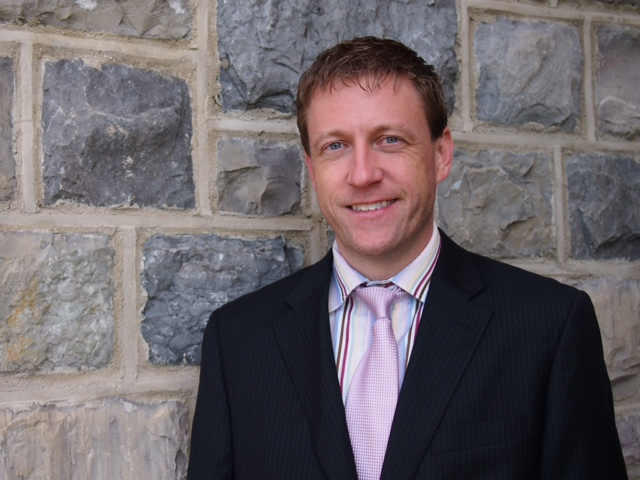
Joseph R. Jones

Joseph R. Jones is an American author and academic known for his research on bullying in educational environments. He is the Dean of the School of Education at Gordon State College in Barnesville, Georgia.

Jones has been interviewed by media outlets about homophobia and bullying in schools and has published numerous works on the topic.

Jones' has co-constructed a K-12 anti-bullying program with an academic colleague that has been implemented in some school districts.

In 2014, Jones received the Hero Award from Auburn University and the National Anti-Bullying Summit. He is the recipient of the 2017 "Stonewall Service Award" from CCCC/NCTE. In 2017, His fifth book, Feather Boas, Black Hoodies, and John Deere Hats: Discussions of Diversity in K-12 and Higher Education, was released. In 2020, the Georgia Council of Teachers of English awarded Jones with the "Teacher of the Year Award."

Jones' work examines how bullying impacts educational environments. Jones has coined two terms in his academic community: "contextual oppositions" and "unnormalizing education". Jones proposes that bullying and homophobia exist because of social normalization and that schools must begin "unnormalizing education to dismantle the hegemonic structures that exist within schools and society."

Jones earned his PhD from The University of Rochester after teaching high school English for several years. He has taught classes in qualitative research, advanced qualitative research, and curriculum development as well as courses in English education. His book, My Second First Year: Leaving Academia for a High School Classroom was released in 2019.

== Works ==
- Making Safe Places Unsafe: A Discussion of Homophobia with Teachers
- Bullying in Schools: A Professional Development for Educators
- (Un)Normalizing Education: Addressing Homophobia in Higher Education and K-12 Schools
- Under the Bleachers: Teachers' Reflections of What They Didn't Learn in College (ed.)
