= Joseph Jay Jones =

American academic and writer (1908–1999)

- Born: June 29, 1908; Peru, Nebraska, U.S.
- Died: February 12, 1999 (aged 90)
- Occupations: Academic, writer

Academic background
- Education: Nebraska State Teachers College at Peru; University of Nebraska (BS); Stanford University (MA, PhD)

Joseph Jay Jones (June 29, 1908 – February 12, 1999) was an American academic and writer with a special interest in English literature from outside the United States.

== History ==
Jones born in Peru, Nebraska and studied at Nebraska State Teachers' College, now Peru State College, and studied for a BSc at University of Nebraska before earning an MA and PhD at Stanford University. He taught for one year at Colorado State College before commencing what was to become a 40-year career in the Faculty of English at the University of Texas.

A major achievement was compilation of American Literary Manuscripts, detailing where essential source documents were held. Another was his private donation to the faculty library of what is now Joseph Jones Caribbean Plays collection.

He published a great many articles and reviews in popular and academic journals and was Supervising editor of around 60 volumes in the World Authors series for Twayne Publishers of Boston and New York between 1965 and 1980.

A personal interest was Waller Creek, which flows through the University, and on the rehabilitation of which he devoted much of his spare time, documented in his most popular publication Life on Waller Creek.

His partner and supporter in these endeavors was his wife Johanna, with whom he published three influential books on literature of other English-speaking countries, a field he had made his specialty.

== Memberships ==
He was a particularly active staff member, serving on Faculty Council and other committees such as

Committee on Fulbright Scholarships
Sophomore English Committee
Texas Union Board

and was an active member of organizations such as

American Association of University Professors
Modern Language Association
National Council of Teachers of English
Conference of College Teachers of English
Texas Association of College Teachers

He served as visiting professor in South Africa and New Zealand as well as elsewhere in the United States.

== Publications ==
(this is by no means an exhaustive list)

- American Literary Manuscripts pub. University of Texas Press, 1960
- Life on Waller Creek pub. AAR/Tantalus Publications, Austin Texas, 1982.
- Canadian Fiction w/ Johanna Jones, Twayne Publishers, Boston 1981
- Australian Fiction w/ Johanna Jones, Twayne Publishers, Boston 1983
- New Zealand Fiction w/ Johanna Jones, Twayne Publishers, Boston 1983

== Recognition ==
- Warshaw Award of the Western Humanities Research Association 1952
- Fulbright Scholarship to New Zealand in 1953
- Jones was made Emeritus Professor by the University of Texas on his retirement in 1975

== Sources ==
- "Joseph Jay Jones".
- "Joseph Jones Caribbean Plays Collection".

== Archives ==
Joseph Jones Collection at the Harry Ransom Center
