= Reconstruction era =

Period after American Civil War (1865–1877)

- 1865–1877
Civil War era	Gilded Age
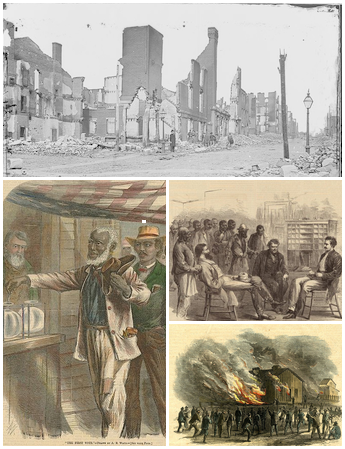
- From left to right and top to the bottom: The ruins of Richmond, Virginia; newly-freed Black Americans voting for the first time in 1867; office of the Freedmen's Bureau in Memphis, Tennessee; Memphis riots of 1866
- Location: United States (Southern States)
- Including: Third Party System
- President(s): Abraham Lincoln; Andrew Johnson; Ulysses S. Grant; Rutherford B. Hayes
- Key events: Freedmen's Bureau; Assassination of Abraham Lincoln; Formation of the KKK; Reconstruction Acts; Impeachment of Andrew Johnson; Enforcement Acts; Reconstruction Amendments; Compromise of 1877

The Reconstruction era, often simply called Reconstruction, was a period in United States history that followed the American Civil War (1861–1865) and was dominated by the legal, social, and political challenges of the abolition of slavery and federal control over, and reintegration of, the former Confederate States into the United States. Three amendments were added to the United States Constitution to grant citizenship and equal civil rights to the newly freed slaves. To circumvent these, former Confederate states imposed poll taxes and literacy tests and sought to intimidate and control the Black population and discourage or prevent them from voting.

Throughout the war, the Union was confronted with the issue of how to administer captured areas and handle slaves escaping to Union lines. The United States Army played a vital role in establishing a free labor economy in the South, protecting freedmen's rights and creating educational and religious institutions. Despite its reluctance to interfere with slavery, Congress passed the Confiscation Acts to seize Confederates' slaves, providing a precedent for President Abraham Lincoln to issue the Emancipation Proclamation. Congress established a Freedmen's Bureau to provide much-needed food and shelter to the newly freed slaves. As it became clear the Union would win, Congress debated the process for readmission of seceded states. Radical and moderate Republicans disagreed over the nature of secession, conditions for readmission, and desirability of social reforms. Lincoln favored the "ten percent plan" and vetoed the Wade–Davis Bill which proposed strict conditions for readmission. Lincoln was assassinated in 1865, just as fighting was drawing to a close. He was replaced by Andrew Johnson, who vetoed Radical Republican bills, pardoned Confederate leaders, and allowed Southern states to enact draconian Black Codes that restricted the rights of freedmen. His actions outraged many Northerners and stoked fears the Southern elite would regain power. Radical Republicans swept to power in the 1866 midterm elections, gaining majorities in both houses of Congress.

In 1867–68, the Radical Republicans enacted the Reconstruction Acts over Johnson's vetoes, setting the terms by which former Confederate states could be readmitted to the Union. Constitutional conventions held throughout the South gave Black men the right to vote. New state governments were established by a coalition of freedmen, supportive white Southerners, and Northern transplants. They were opposed by "Redeemers" who sought to restore white supremacy and reestablish Democratic Party control of Southern governments and society. Violent groups, including the Ku Klux Klan, White League, and Red Shirts, engaged in paramilitary insurgency and terrorism to disrupt Reconstruction governments and terrorize Republicans. Congressional anger at Johnson's vetoes of Radical Republican legislation led to his impeachment by the House of Representatives, but he was not convicted by the Senate and therefore was not removed from office.

Under President Ulysses S. Grant, Radical Republicans enacted additional legislation to enforce civil rights, such as the Ku Klux Klan Act and Civil Rights Act of 1875. However, resistance to Reconstruction by Southern whites and its high cost contributed to its losing support in the North. The 1876 presidential election was marked by Black voter suppression in the South, and the result was close and contested. An Electoral Commission resulted in the Compromise of 1877 which awarded the election to Republican Rutherford B. Hayes on the understanding that federal troops would cease to play an active role in regional politics. Hayes accordingly removed the last federal troops from the South, which historians generally mark as the end of Reconstruction. Efforts to enforce federal civil rights in the South ended in 1890 with the failure of the Lodge Bill.

Historians disagree about the legacy of Reconstruction. Criticism focuses on the failure to prevent violence, corruption, starvation and disease. Some consider the Union's policy toward freed slaves as inadequate and toward former slaveholders as too lenient. However, Reconstruction is credited with restoring the federal Union, limiting reprisals against the South, and establishing a legal framework for racial equality via constitutional rights to national birthright citizenship, due process, equal protection of the laws, and male suffrage regardless of race.

== Dating ==
The Reconstruction era had historically been dated from the end of the Civil War in 1865 until 1877, though other periodization schemes have been proposed more recently. In the 20th century, most scholars began their review in 1865, with the end of formal hostilities between the North and South. However, in his landmark 1988 monograph Reconstruction, Eric Foner proposes 1863, starting with the Emancipation Proclamation, Port Royal Experiment, and earnest debate of Reconstruction policies during the war. By 2017, among scholars it was widely understood that Reconstruction started in either "1863 with the Emancipation Proclamation or 1865 with the end of the war".

The Reconstruction Era National Historical Park proposed 1861 as a starting date, interpreting Reconstruction as beginning "as soon as the Union captured territory in the Confederacy". According to Downs and Masur, "Reconstruction began when the first US soldiers arrived in slaveholding territory, and enslaved people escaped". Soon afterwards, early discourse and experimentation began regarding Reconstruction policies. The policies provided opportunities to enslaved Gullah populations in the Sea Islands who became free overnight on November 7, 1861, after the Battle of Port Royal when slaveholders fled. After the battle, Reconstruction policies were implemented under the Port Royal Experiment which were education, landownership, and labor reform. This transition to a free society was called "Rehearsal for Reconstruction".

The conventional end of Reconstruction is 1877, with the reduction of the role of federal troops in regional politics. Later dates have been suggested. Fritzhugh Brundage proposes that Reconstruction ended in 1890, when Republicans failed to pass the Lodge Bill to secure voting rights for Black Americans in the South. Heather Cox Richardson argues for a periodization from 1865 until 1920, when the election of President Warren G. Harding marked the end of a national sentiment in favor of using government to promote equality. Manisha Sinha periodizes Reconstruction from 1860—when Lincoln won office as a president opposed to slavery—until 1920, when America ratified the Nineteenth Amendment to the United States Constitution affirming the right of women to vote, which Sinha calls "the last Reconstruction amendment" because it drew upon a Reconstruction belief that government could protect civil and political rights.

== Background ==
In the American Civil War, eleven Southern states (all of which permitted slavery) seceded from the United States following the election of Lincoln to the presidency and formed the Confederate States of America. Though Lincoln initially declared secession "legally void" and declined to negotiate with Confederate delegates to Washington, following the Confederate assault on the Union garrison at Fort Sumter, Lincoln declared that "an extraordinary occasion" existed in the South and raised an army to quell "combinations too powerful to be suppressed by the ordinary course of judicial proceedings." Over the next four years, 237 named battles were fought between the Union and Confederate armies, resulting in the dissolution of the Confederate States in 1865. During the war, Lincoln issued the Emancipation Proclamation which declares that "all persons held as slaves" within the Confederate territory "are, and henceforward shall be free."

=== Abolition of slavery and social reform ===
The Civil War had immense social implications for the United States. Emancipation had altered the legal status of 3.5 million persons, threatened the end of the plantation economy of the South, and provoked questions regarding the legal and social inequality of the races. The end of the war was accompanied by a large migration of newly freed people to the cities, where they were relegated to the lowest paying jobs, such as unskilled and service labor. Men worked as rail workers, rolling and lumber mills workers, and hotel workers. Black women were largely confined to domestic work employed as cooks, maids, and child nurses, or in hotels and laundries. The large population of slave artisans during the prewar period did not translate into a large number of free artisans during Reconstruction. The dislocations had a severe negative impact on the Black population, with a large amount of sickness and death.

During the war, Lincoln experimented with land reform by giving land to African-Americans in South Carolina. Having lost their enormous investment in slaves, plantation owners had minimal capital to pay freedmen to bring in crops. As a result, a system of sharecropping was developed in which landowners broke up large plantations and rented small lots to the freedmen and their families. Thus, the main structure of the Southern economy changed from an elite minority of landed gentry slaveholders into a tenant farming agriculture system.

Historian David W. Blight identifies three visions of the social implications of Reconstruction:

- the reconciliationist vision, which focused on coping with the death and devastation the war had brought;
- the white supremacist vision, which demanded strict segregation of the races and the preservation of political and cultural domination of Blacks by Whites, opposed any right to vote by Blacks, and accepted intimidation and violence; and
- the emancipationist vision, which emphasized full freedom, citizenship, male suffrage, and constitutional equality for African Americans.

=== Economic devastation ===
The Civil War had a devastating economic and material impact on the South, where most combat occurred. The enormous cost of the Confederate war effort took a high toll on the region's economic infrastructure. The direct costs in human capital, government expenditures, and physical destruction totaled $3.3 billion. By early 1865, the Confederate dollar had nearly zero value, and the Southern banking system was in collapse by the war's end. Where scarce Union dollars could not be obtained, residents resorted to a barter system.

The Confederate States in 1861 had 297 towns and cities, with a total population of 835,000 people; of these, 162—with 681,000 people—were at some point occupied by Union forces. Eleven cities were destroyed or severely damaged by military action, including Atlanta, Charleston, Columbia, and Richmond, though the rate of damage in smaller towns was much lower. Farms were in disrepair, and the prewar stock of horses, mules, and cattle was much depleted. Forty percent of Southern livestock had been killed. The South's farms were not highly mechanized, but the value of farm implements and machinery according to the 1860 Census was $81 million and had been reduced 40% by 1870. The transportation infrastructure lay in ruins, with little railroad or riverboat service available to move crops and animals to market. Railroad mileage was located mostly in rural areas; over two-thirds of the South's rails, bridges, rail yards, repair shops, and rolling stock were in areas reached by Union armies, which systematically destroyed what they could. Even in untouched areas, the lack of maintenance and repair, the absence of new equipment, the heavy over-use, and the deliberate relocation of equipment by the Confederates from remote areas to the war zone ensured the system would be ruined at war's end. Restoring the infrastructure—especially the railroad system—became a high priority for Reconstruction state governments.

Over a quarter of Southern White men of military age—the backbone of the White workforce—died during the war, leaving their families destitute, and per capita income for White Southerners declined from $125 in 1857 to a low of $80 in 1879. By the end of the 19th century and well into the 20th century, the South was locked into a system of poverty. How much of this failure was caused by the war and by previous reliance on slavery remains the subject of debate among economists and historians. In both the North and South, modernization and industrialization were the focus of the post-war recovery, built on the growth of cities, railroads, factories, and banks and led by Radical Republicans and former Whigs.

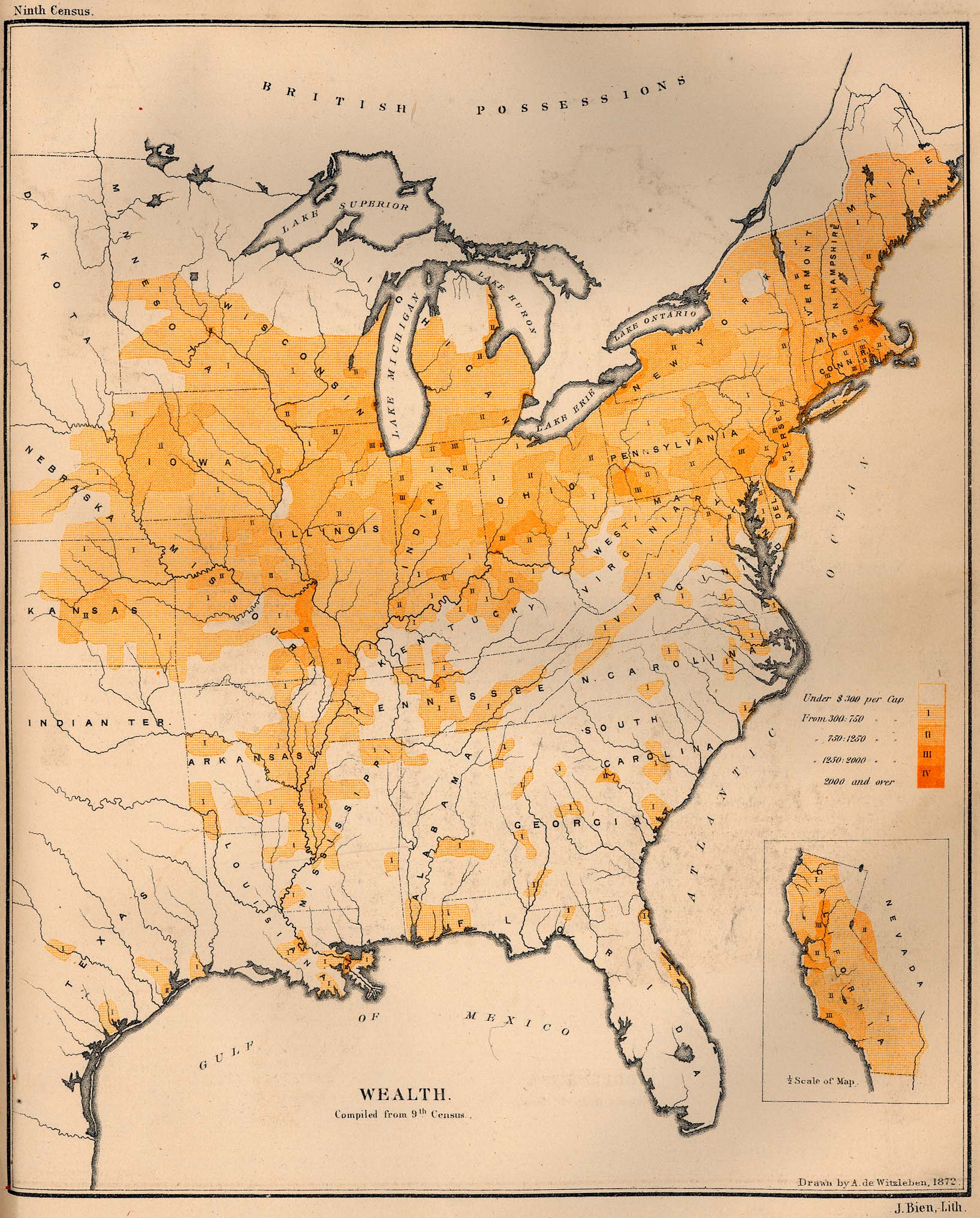
The distribution of wealth per capita in 1872, illustrating the disparity between North and South in that period

=== Legal reconstruction ===
From its origins, questions existed as to the legal significance of the Civil War, whether secession had actually occurred, and what measures, if any, were necessary to restore the governments of the Confederate States. For example, throughout the conflict the United States government recognized the legitimacy of a unionist government in Virginia led by Francis Harrison Pierpont out of Wheeling. (This recognition was rendered moot when the Pierpont government separated the northwestern counties of the state and sought admission as West Virginia.) As additional territory came under Union control, reconstructed governments were established in Tennessee, Arkansas, and Louisiana.

The first plan for legal reconstruction was introduced by Lincoln in his Proclamation of Amnesty and Reconstruction, the so-called "ten percent plan" under which a loyal Unionist state government would be established when ten percent of its 1860 voters pledged an oath of allegiance to the Union, with a complete pardon for those who pledged such an oath. By 1864, Louisiana, Tennessee, and Arkansas had established fully functioning Unionist governments under this plan. However, Congress passed the Wade–Davis Bill in opposition, which instead proposed that a majority of voters must pledge that they had never supported the Confederate government and disenfranchised all those who had. Lincoln vetoed the Wade–Davis Bill, but it established a lasting conflict between the presidential and congressional visions of reconstruction.

== Timeline ==
- August 6, 1861: The Confiscation Act of 1861 becomes law.
- March 3, 1862: Lincoln appoints Andrew Johnson of Tennessee as the first military governor of a Southern state.
- July 17, 1862: The Confiscation Act of 1862 becomes law, providing the legal basis for the Emancipation Proclamation.
- January 1, 1863: Lincoln issues the Emancipation Proclamation, freeing all persons held in slavery in Confederate territory.
- December 8, 1863: Lincoln announces his "ten percent plan" for the recognizing unionist governments in Union-controlled Confederate territory.
- January 16, 1865: General William Tecumseh Sherman issues Special Field Orders No. 15.
- February 3, 1865: Lincoln meets to discuss reconciliation with Southern representatives at the Hampton Roads Conference.
- March 3, 1865: The Freedmen's Bureau Act becomes law.
- April 9, 1865: General Robert E. Lee surrenders the Army of Northern Virginia to Ulysses S. Grant, effectively ending hostilities on land.
- April 14, 1865: Lincoln is assassinated by John Wilkes Booth. Andrew Johnson becomes President.
- December 6, 1865: The Thirteenth Amendment to the United States Constitution is ratified.
- March 27, 1866: Johnson vetoes the Civil Rights Act of 1866.
- May 1 to 3, 1866: Riots in Memphis, Tennessee kill 48, primarily freed African Americans, and injure 75.
- July 24, 1866: Tennessee is the first state reestablished or readmitted to the Union.
- July 30, 1866: At least 38 people are killed and 146 wounded in New Orleans at a racially integrated constitutional convention.
- August 27 through September 15, 1866: President Johnson launches a national speaking tour to rally support for his policies.
- October 9 through November 6, 1866: Congressional elections return large majorities for the radicals, ending presidential reconstruction under Johnson.
- March 4, 1867: Congress passes the first Reconstruction Act, establishing requirements for the readmission of additional states, over Johnson's veto.
- July 19, 1867: Congress passes the third Reconstruction Act, creating a system of military government throughout the South.
- August 12, 1867: Johnson suspends Secretary of War Edwin Stanton from office over his military reconstruction policies.
- March 2 and 3, 1868: Congress impeaches President Johnson on eleven articles of impeachment for violating the Tenure of Office Act.
- May 26, 1868: The Senate narrowly votes against convicting Johnson.
- July 9, 1868: The Fourteenth Amendment to the United States Constitution is ratified.
- February 3, 1870: The Fifteenth Amendment to the United States Constitution is ratified.
- May 31, 1870: The Enforcement Act of 1870 becomes law.
- February 24, 1871: Representatives from Georgia, the final Confederate state to be readmitted, are seated in Congress.
- February 28, 1871: The Second Enforcement Act becomes law.
- April 20, 1871: The Ku Klux Klan Act becomes law.
- May 22, 1872: The Amnesty Act becomes law.
- March 1, 1875: The Civil Rights Act of 1875 becomes law.
- November 6, 1876: The presidential election between Hayes and Tilden results in an electoral dispute over Florida, South Carolina, and Louisiana. Hayes' highly disputed victory in 1877 coincides with the removal of federal troops from the South.

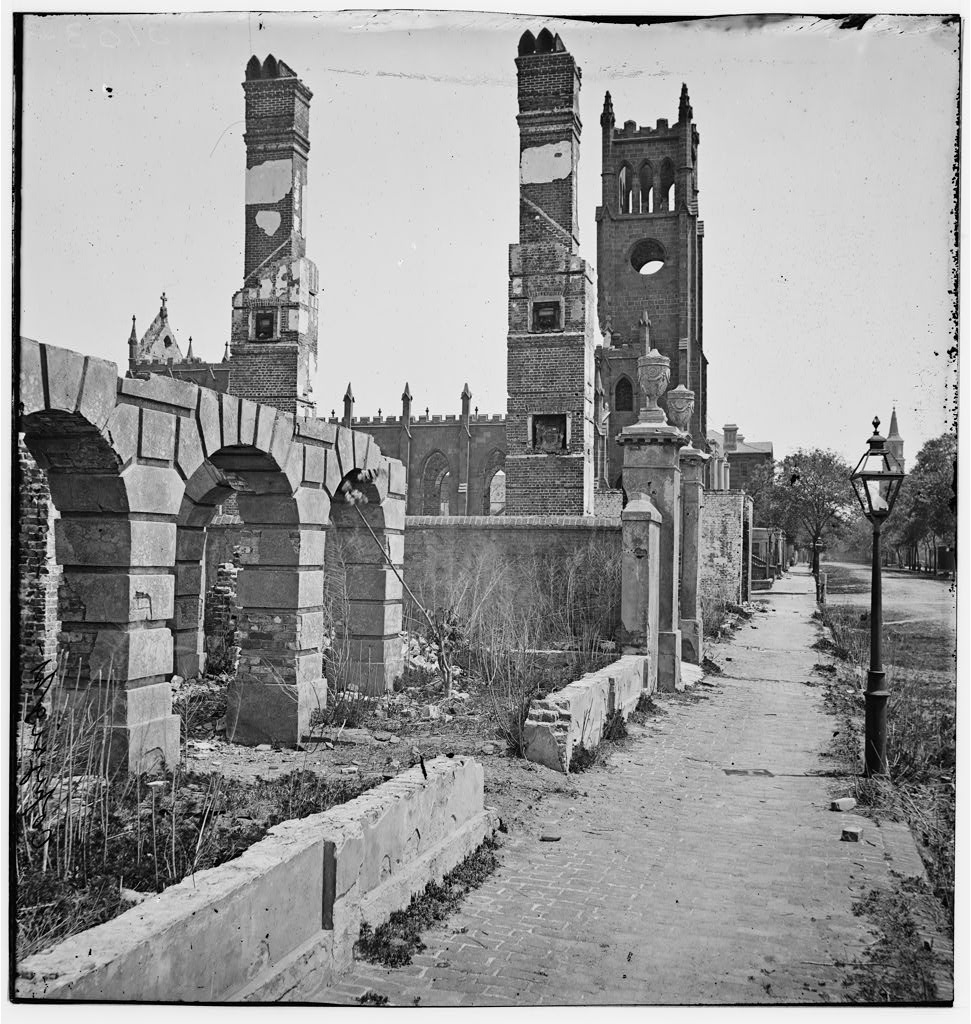
The Southern economy had been ruined by the war. Charleston, South Carolina: Broad Street, 1865

== Restoring the South to the Union ==
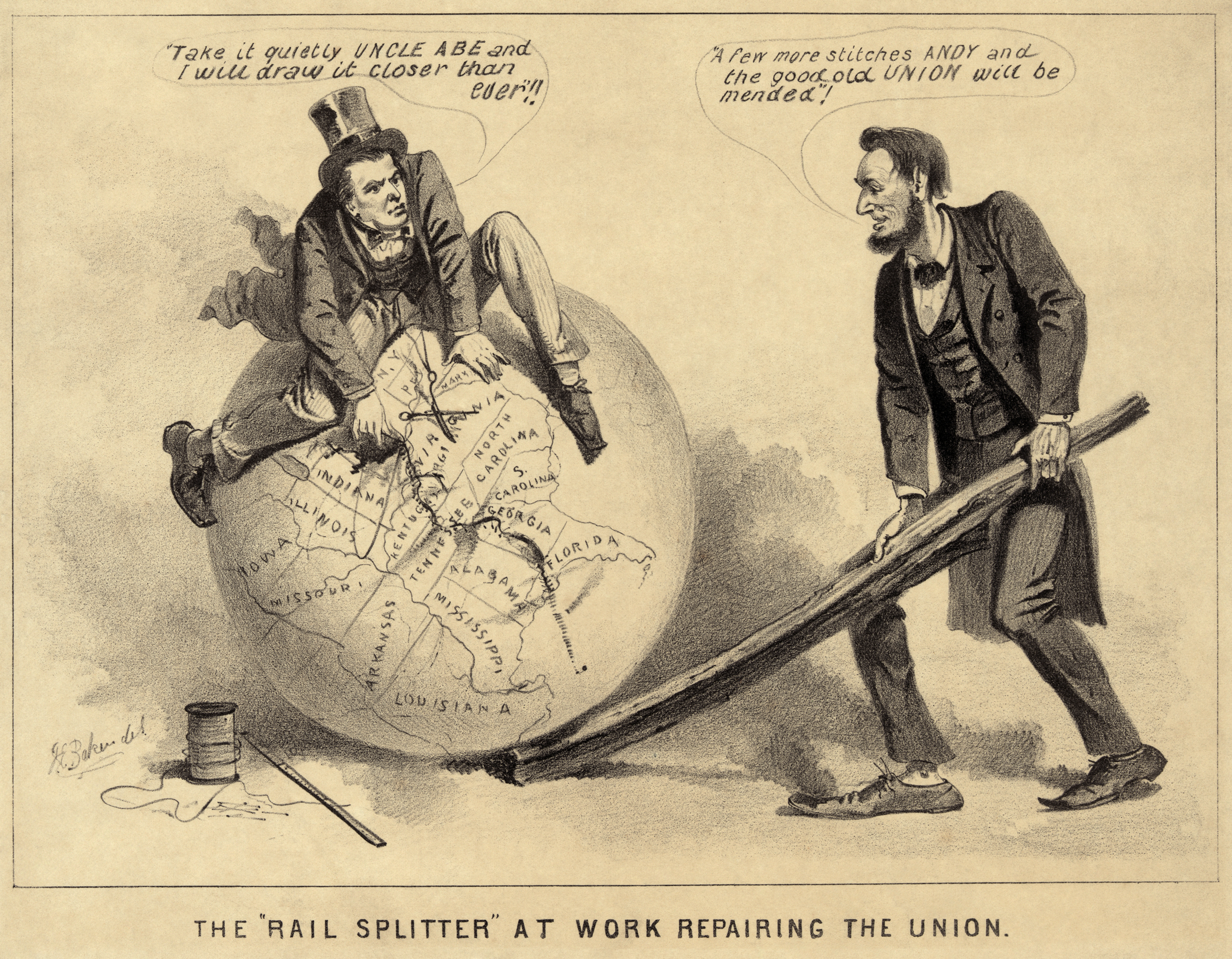
A political cartoon of Andrew Johnson and Abraham Lincoln, 1865, entitled "The Rail Splitter At Work Repairing the Union". The caption reads (Johnson): "Take it quietly Uncle Abe and I will draw it closer than ever." (Lincoln): "A few more stitches Andy and the good old Union will be mended."

During the Civil War, the Radical Republican leaders argued that slavery and the Slave Power had to be permanently destroyed. Moderates said this could be easily accomplished as soon as the Confederate States Army surrendered and the Southern states repealed secession and accepted the Thirteenth Amendment—most of which happened by December 1865.

Lincoln broke with the Radicals in 1864. The Wade–Davis Bill was designed to permanently disfranchise the Confederate element in the South. The bill asked the government to grant African American men the right to vote and that anyone who willingly gave weapons to the fight against the United States should be denied the right to vote. The bill required voters, 51% of White males, to take the Ironclad Oath swearing that they had never supported the Confederacy or been one of its soldiers. This oath also entailed having them to swear a loyalty to the Constitution and the Union before they could have state constitutional meetings. Lincoln blocked it. Pursuing a policy of "malice toward none" announced in his second inaugural address, Lincoln asked voters only to support the Union in the future, regardless of the past.

=== 1865 ===
Upon President Lincoln's assassination in April 1865, Vice President Andrew Johnson became president. Radicals considered Johnson to be an ally, but upon becoming president he rejected the Radical program of Reconstruction. He was on good terms with ex-Confederates in the South and ex-Copperheads in the North. He appointed his own governors and tried to close the Reconstruction process by the end of 1865. Representative Thaddeus Stevens vehemently opposed Johnson's plans for an abrupt end to Reconstruction, insisting that Reconstruction must "revolutionize Southern institutions, habits, and manners .... The foundations of their institutions ... must be broken up and relaid, or all our blood and treasure have been spent in vain." Johnson broke decisively with the Republicans in Congress when he vetoed the Civil Rights Act on March 27, 1866. While Democrats celebrated, the Republicans rallied, passed the bill again, and overrode Johnson's repeat veto. Full-scale political warfare now existed between Johnson (now allied with the Democrats) and the Radical Republicans.

Since the war had ended, Congress rejected Johnson's argument that he had the war power to decide what to do. Congress decided it had the primary authority to decide how Reconstruction should proceed, because the Constitution states the United States had to guarantee each state a republican form of government. The Radicals insisted that meant Congress decided how Reconstruction should be achieved. The issues were multiple: Who should decide, Congress or the president? How should republicanism operate in the South? What was the status of the former Confederate states? What was the citizenship status of the leaders of the Confederacy? What was the citizenship and suffrage status of freedmen?

After the war ended, Johnson gave back most of the land to the former White slave owners.

=== 1866 ===
By 1866, the faction of Radical Republicans led by Stevens and Senator Charles Sumner were convinced that Johnson's Southern appointees were disloyal to the Union, hostile to loyal Unionists, and enemies of the freedmen. Radicals used as evidence outbreaks of mob violence against Black people, such as the Memphis riots of 1866 and the New Orleans Massacre of 1866. Radical Republicans demanded a prompt and strong federal response to protect freedmen and curb Southern racism.

Stevens and his followers viewed secession as having left the states in a status like new territories. Sumner argued that secession had destroyed statehood but the Constitution still extended its authority and its protection over individuals, as in existing U.S. territories. The Republicans sought to prevent Johnson's Southern politicians from "restoring the historical subordination of Negroes". Since slavery was abolished, the Three-fifths Compromise no longer applied to counting the population of Blacks. After the 1870 Census, the South would gain numerous representatives in Congress, based on the full population of freedmen. (Note: All Blacks would be counted in 1870, whether or not they were citizens.) One Illinois Republican expressed a common fear that if the South were allowed to simply restore its previous established powers, that the "reward of treason will be an increased representation".

The elections of 1866 decisively changed the balance of power, giving the Republicans two-thirds majorities in both houses of Congress and enough votes to overcome Johnson's vetoes. They moved to impeach Johnson because of his constant attempts to thwart Radical Reconstruction measures, by using the Tenure of Office Act. Johnson was acquitted by one vote, but he lost the influence to shape Reconstruction policy.

=== 1867 ===
In 1867, Congress passed the Reconstruction Acts of 1867 which outlined the terms in which the rebel states would be readmitted to the Union. Under these acts Congress established military districts in the South and used Army personnel to administer the region until new governments loyal to the Union—that accepted the Fourteenth Amendment and the right of freedmen to vote—could be established. Congress temporarily suspended the ability to vote of approximately 10,000 to 15,000 former Confederate officials and senior officers, while constitutional amendments gave full citizenship to all African Americans and suffrage to the adult men.

With the power to vote, freedmen began participating in politics. While many enslaved people were illiterate, educated Blacks (including fugitive slaves) moved from the North to aid them, and natural leaders also stepped forward. They elected White and Black men to represent them in constitutional conventions. A Republican coalition of freedmen, Southerners supportive of the Union (derisively called "scalawags" by White Democrats), and Northerners who had migrated to the South (derisively called "carpetbaggers")—some of whom were returning natives but were mostly Union veterans—organized to create constitutional conventions. They created new state constitutions to set new directions for Southern states.

=== Suffrage ===
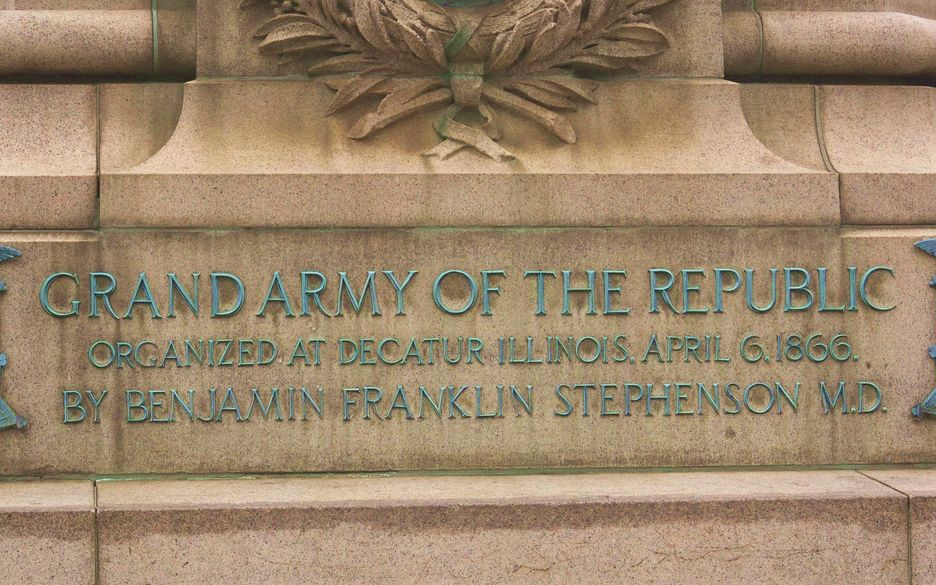
Monument in honor of the Grand Army of the Republic, organized after the war

Congress had to consider how to restore to full status and representation within the Union those Southern states that had declared their independence from the United States and had withdrawn their representation. Suffrage for former Confederates was one of two main concerns. A decision needed to be made whether to allow just some or all former Confederates to vote (and to hold office). The moderates in Congress wanted virtually all of them to vote, but the Radicals resisted. They repeatedly imposed the Ironclad Oath, which would effectively have allowed no former Confederates to vote. Historian Harold Hyman says that in 1866 congressmen "described the oath as the last bulwark against the return of ex-rebels to power, the barrier behind which Southern Unionists and Negroes protected themselves".

Congressman Stevens proposed unsuccessfully that all former Confederates lose the right to vote for five years. The compromise that was reached disenfranchised as many as 10,000 to 15,000 Confederate civil and military leaders. Radical politicians took up the task at the state level. In Tennessee alone, over 80,000 former Confederates were disenfranchised.

Second, and closely related, was the issue of whether the 4 million freedmen were to be received as citizens: Would they be able to vote? If they were to be fully counted as citizens, some sort of representation for apportionment of seats in Congress had to be determined. Before the war, the population of slaves had been counted as three-fifths of a corresponding number of free Whites. By having 4 million freedmen counted as full citizens, the South would gain additional seats in Congress. If Blacks were denied the vote and the right to hold office, then only Whites would represent them. Many, including most White Southerners, Northern Democrats, and some Northern Republicans, opposed voting rights for African-Americans. The small fraction of Republican voters opposed to Black suffrage contributed to the defeats of several suffrage measures voted on in most Northern states. Some Northern states that had referendums on the subject limited the ability of their own small populations of Blacks to vote.

Lincoln had supported a middle position: to allow some Black men to vote, especially U.S. Army veterans. Johnson also believed that such service should be rewarded with citizenship. Lincoln proposed giving the vote to "the very intelligent, and especially those who have fought gallantly in our ranks". In 1864 Johnson said: "The better class of them will go to work and sustain themselves, and that class ought to be allowed to vote, on the ground that a loyal Negro is more worthy than a disloyal White man." As president in 1865, Johnson wrote to Mississippi Governor William L. Sharkey (whom he had appointed), recommending: "If you could extend the elective franchise to all persons of color who can read the Constitution in English and write their names, and to all persons of color who own real estate valued at least two hundred and fifty dollars, and pay taxes thereon, you would completely disarm the adversary [Radicals in Congress], and set an example the other states will follow."

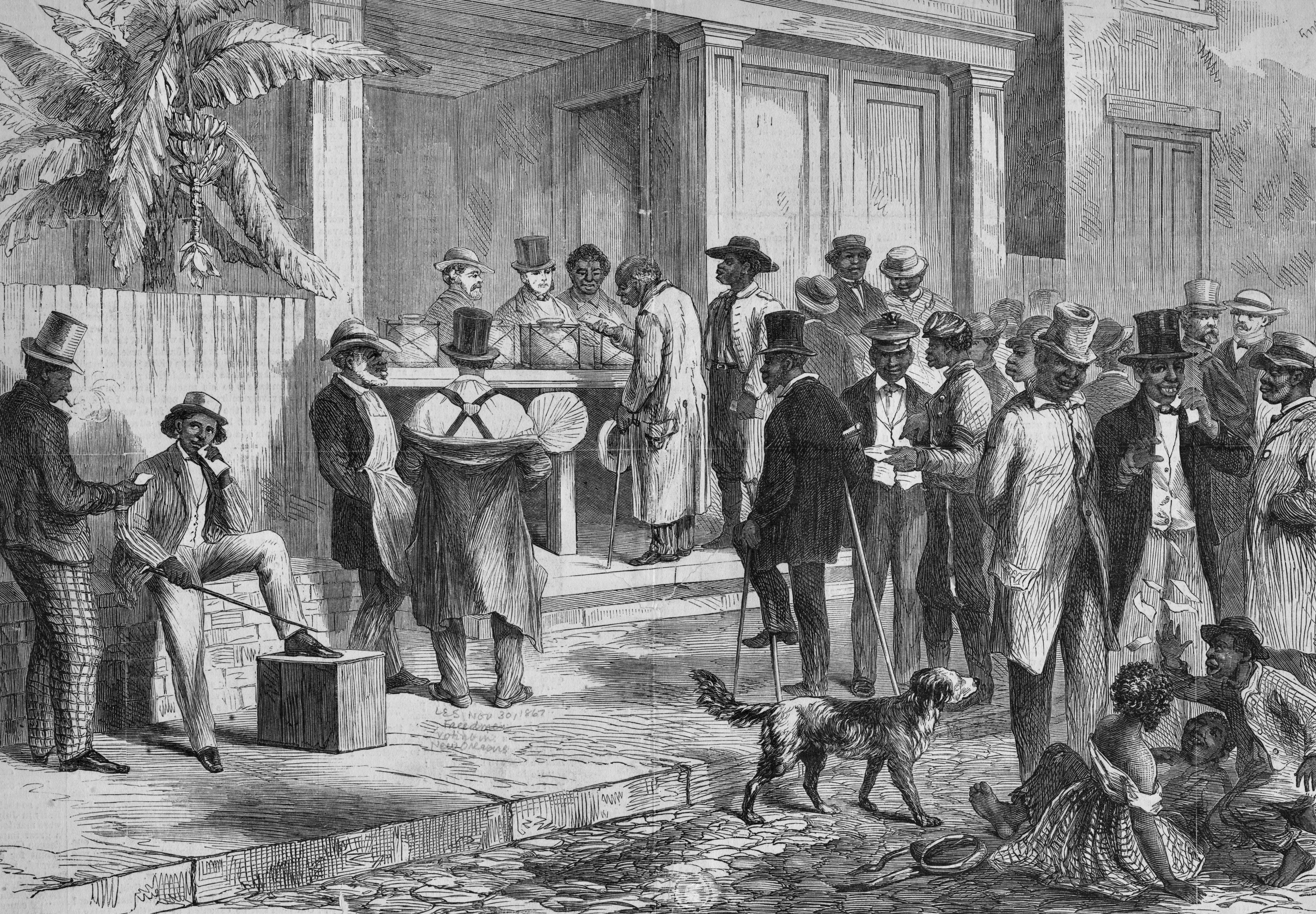
Freedmen voting in New Orleans, 1867

Sumner and Stevens were initially hesitant to enfranchise the largely illiterate freedmen. Sumner preferred at first impartial requirements that would have imposed literacy restrictions on Blacks and Whites. He believed that he would not succeed in passing legislation to disenfranchise illiterate Whites who already had the vote. In the South, many poor Whites were illiterate as there was almost no public education before the war. In 1880, for example, the White illiteracy rate was about 25% in Tennessee, Kentucky, Alabama, South Carolina, and Georgia, and as high as 33% in North Carolina. This compares with the 9% national rate, and a Black rate of illiteracy that was over 70% in the South. By 1900, however, with emphasis within the Black community on education, the majority of Blacks had achieved literacy.

Sumner soon concluded that "there was no substantial protection for the freedman except in the franchise". This was necessary, he stated, "(1) For his own protection; (2) For the protection of the white Unionist; and (3) For the peace of the country. We put the musket in his hands because it was necessary; for the same reason we must give him the franchise." The support for voting rights was a compromise between moderate and Radical Republicans.

The Republicans believed that the best way for men to get political experience was to be able to vote and to participate in the political system. They passed laws allowing all male freedmen to vote. In 1867, Black men voted for the first time. Over the course of Reconstruction, more than 1,500 African Americans held public office in the South; some of them were men who had escaped to the North and gained educations, and returned to the South. They did not hold office in numbers representative of their proportion in the population but often elected Whites to represent them. The question of women's suffrage was also debated but was rejected leading to the creation of the National Woman Suffrage Association and the American Woman Suffrage Association. Women eventually gained the right to vote with the Nineteenth Amendment to the United States Constitution in 1920.

From 1890 to 1908, Southern states passed new state constitutions and laws that disenfranchised most Blacks and tens of thousands of poor Whites with voter registration and electoral rules. When establishing new requirements such as subjectively administered literacy tests, in some states, they used "grandfather clauses" to enable illiterate Whites to vote.

=== Southern Treaty Commission ===
The Five Civilized Tribes that had been relocated to Indian Territory (now part of Oklahoma) held Black slaves and signed treaties supporting the Confederacy. During the war, a war among pro-Union and anti-Union Native Americans had raged. Congress passed a statute that gave the president the authority to suspend the appropriations of any tribe if the tribe is "in a state of actual hostility to the government of the United States ... and, by proclamation, to declare all treaties with such tribe to be abrogated by such tribe".

As a component of Reconstruction, the Interior Department ordered a meeting of representatives from all Indian tribes who had affiliated with the Confederacy. The council, the Southern Treaty Commission, was first held in Fort Smith, Arkansas, in September 1865 and was attended by hundreds of Native Americans representing dozens of tribes. Over the next several years the commission negotiated treaties with tribes that resulted in additional re-locations to Indian Territory and the de facto creation (initially by treaty) of an unorganized Oklahoma Territory.

== Lincoln administration ==
=== Preliminary events ===
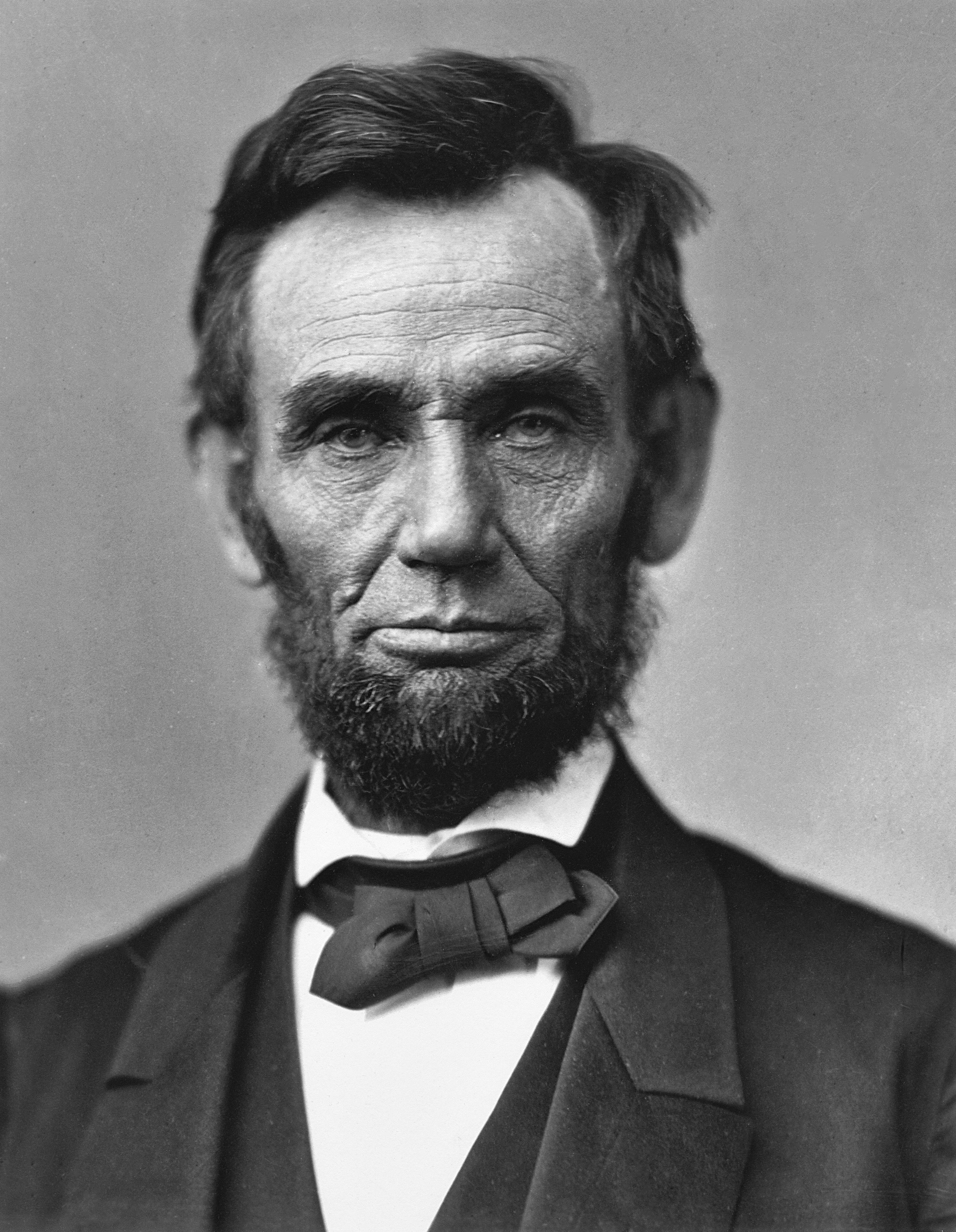
Abraham Lincoln, 16th President of the United States (1861–1865)

President Lincoln signed two Confiscation Acts into law, the first on August 6, 1861, and the second on July 17, 1862, safeguarding fugitive slaves who crossed from the Confederacy across Union lines and giving them indirect emancipation if their masters continued insurrection against the United States. The laws allowed the confiscation of lands for colonization from those who aided and supported the rebellion. However, these laws had limited effect as they were poorly funded by Congress and poorly enforced by Attorney General Edward Bates.

In August 1861, Major General John C. Frémont, Union commander of the Western Department, declared martial law in Missouri, confiscated Confederate property, and emancipated their slaves. Lincoln immediately ordered Frémont to rescind his emancipation declaration, stating: "I think there is great danger that ... the liberating slaves of traitorous owners, will alarm our Southern Union friends, and turn them against us—perhaps ruin our fair prospect for Kentucky." After Frémont refused to rescind the emancipation order, Lincoln terminated him from active duty on November 2, 1861. Lincoln was concerned that the border states would secede from the Union if slaves were given their freedom. On May 26, 1862, Union Major General David Hunter emancipated slaves in South Carolina, Georgia, and Florida, declaring all "persons ... heretofore held as slaves ... forever free". Lincoln, embarrassed by the order, rescinded Hunter's declaration and canceled the emancipation.

On April 16, 1862, Lincoln signed a bill into law outlawing slavery in Washington, D.C., and freeing the estimated 3,500 slaves in the city. On June 19, 1862, he signed legislation outlawing slavery in all U.S. territories. On July 17, 1862, under the authority of the Confiscation Acts and an amended Force Bill of 1795, he authorized the recruitment of freed slaves into the U.S. Army and seizure of any Confederate property for military purposes.

=== Gradual emancipation and compensation ===
In an effort to keep border states in the Union, as early as 1861 Lincoln designed gradual compensated emancipation programs paid for by government bonds. Lincoln desired Delaware, Maryland, Kentucky, and Missouri to "adopt a system of gradual emancipation which should work the extinction of slavery in twenty years". On March 26, 1862, Lincoln met with Senator Sumner and recommended that a special joint session of Congress be convened to discuss giving financial aid to any border states who initiated a gradual emancipation plan. In April 1862, the joint session of Congress met; however, the border states were not interested and did not make any response to Lincoln or any congressional emancipation proposal. Lincoln advocated compensated emancipation during the Hampton Roads Conference.

=== Colonization ===
In August 1862, Lincoln met with African American leaders and urged them to colonize some place in Central America. Lincoln planned to free the Southern slaves in the Emancipation Proclamation, and he was concerned that freedmen would not be well treated in the United States by Whites in both the North and South. Although Lincoln gave assurances that the United States government would support and protect any colonies that were established for former slaves, the leaders declined the offer of colonization. Many free Blacks had been opposed to colonization plans in the past because they wanted to remain in the United States. Lincoln persisted in his colonization plan in the belief that emancipation and colonization were both part of the same program. By April 1863, Lincoln was successful in sending Black colonists to Haiti as well as 453 to Chiriqui in Central America; however, none of the colonies were able to remain self-sufficient. Frederick Douglass, a prominent 19th-century American civil rights activist, criticized Lincoln by stating that he was "showing all his inconsistencies, his pride of race and blood, his contempt for Negroes and his canting hypocrisy". African Americans, according to Douglass, wanted citizenship and civil rights rather than colonies. Historians are unsure if Lincoln gave up on the idea of African American colonization at the end of 1863 or if he actually planned to continue this policy up until 1865.

=== Installation of military governors ===
Starting in March 1862, in an effort to forestall Reconstruction by the Radicals in Congress, Lincoln installed military governors in certain rebellious states under Union military control. Although the states would not be recognized by the Radicals until an undetermined time, installation of military governors kept the administration of Reconstruction under presidential control, rather than that of the increasingly unsympathetic Radical Congress. On March 3, 1862, Lincoln installed a loyalist Democrat, Senator Andrew Johnson, as military governor with the rank of brigadier general in his home state of Tennessee. In May 1862, Lincoln appointed Edward Stanly military governor of the coastal region of North Carolina with the rank of brigadier general. Stanly resigned almost a year later when he angered Lincoln by closing two schools for Black children in New Bern. After Lincoln installed Brigadier General George Foster Shepley as military governor of Louisiana in May 1862, Shepley sent two anti-slavery representatives, Benjamin Flanders and Michael Hahn, elected in December 1862, to the House, which capitulated and voted to seat them. In July 1862, Lincoln installed Colonel John S. Phelps as military governor of Arkansas, though the United States Senate did not confirm the appointment.

=== Emancipation Proclamation ===
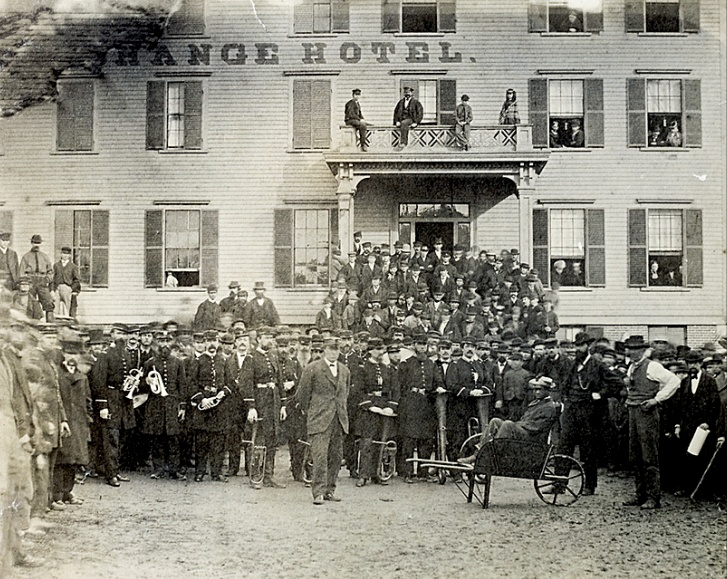
Celebration of the Emancipation Proclamation in Massachusetts, 1862

In July 1862, Lincoln became convinced that "a military necessity" would give him authority under the Constitution to strike at slavery in order to win the Civil War for the Union. The Confiscation Acts were having only a minimal effect to end slavery. On July 22, he wrote a first draft of the Emancipation Proclamation that freed the slaves in states in rebellion. After he showed his Cabinet the document, slight alterations were made in the wording. Lincoln decided that the defeat of the Confederate invasion of the North at the Battle of Antietam was a sufficient battlefield victory to enable him, on September 22, to release the preliminary Emancipation Proclamation, which gave the rebels 100 days to return to the Union or the actual proclamation would be issued.

On January 1, 1863, Lincoln issued the final Emancipation Proclamation, naming ten states in which slaves would be "forever free". The proclamation does not name the states of Tennessee (because it was under Union control) or Kentucky, Missouri, Maryland, and Delaware (because, though slave states, they had not seceded) and specifically excludes numerous counties in some other states. Eventually, as the U.S. Army advanced into the Confederacy, millions of slaves were set free. Many of these freedmen joined the U.S. Army, as the Emancipation Proclamation authorized them to do, and fought in battles against the Confederate forces. Yet hundreds of thousands of freed slaves died during emancipation from illnesses that devastated army regiments. Freed slaves suffered from smallpox, yellow fever, and malnutrition.

=== Ten percent plan ===
Lincoln was determined to effect a speedy restoration of the Confederate states to the Union after the Civil War. In 1863, he proposed a moderate plan for the Reconstruction of the captured Confederate state of Louisiana. The plan granted amnesty to rebels who took an oath of loyalty to the Union. Black freedmen workers were tied to labor on plantations for one year at a pay rate of $10 per month. Ten percent of the state's electorate had to take the loyalty oath in order for the state to be readmitted into the U.S. Congress. The state was required to abolish slavery in its new state constitution. Identical Reconstruction plans would be adopted in Arkansas and Tennessee. By December 1864, the Lincoln plan of Reconstruction had been enacted in Louisiana, and the legislature sent two senators and five representatives to take their seats in Washington. However, Congress refused to count any of the votes from Louisiana, Arkansas, and Tennessee, in essence rejecting Lincoln's moderate Reconstruction plan. Douglass denounced Lincoln's plan as undemocratic since state admission and loyalty only depended on a minority vote.

=== Legalization of slave marriages ===
Before 1864, slave marriages had not been recognized legally; emancipation did not affect them. When freed, many sought official marriages. Before emancipation, slaves could not enter into contracts, including the marriage contract. Not all free people formalized their unions. Some continued to have common-law marriages or community-recognized relationships. The acknowledgement of marriage by the state increased the state's recognition of freed people as legal actors and eventually helped make the case for parental rights for freed people against the practice of apprenticeship of Black children. These children were legally taken away from their families under the guise of "providing them with guardianship and 'good' homes until they reached the age of consent at twenty-one" under acts such as the Georgia 1866 Apprentice Act. Such children were generally used as sources of unpaid labor.

=== Freedmen's Bureau ===
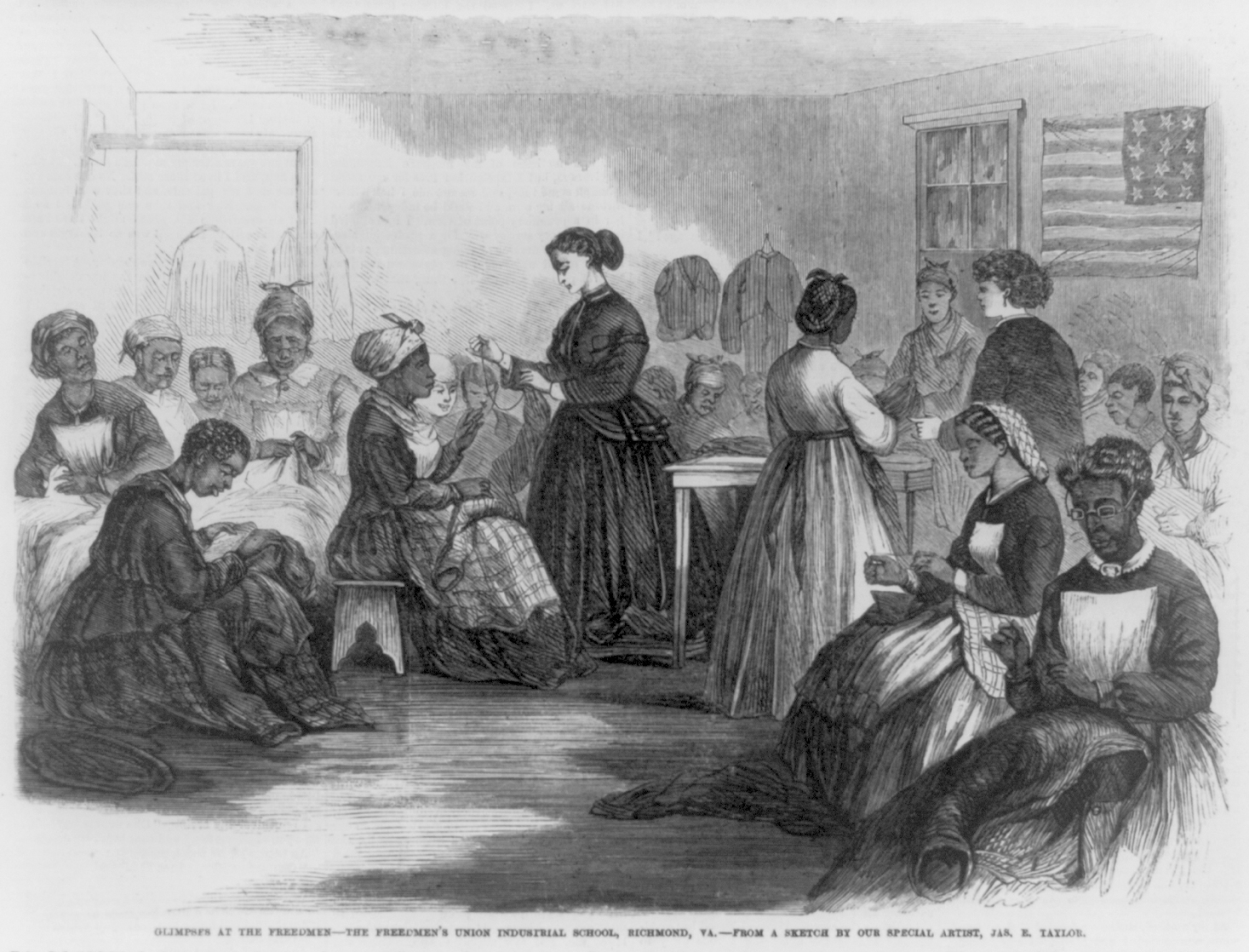
Northern teachers traveled into the South to provide education and training for the newly freed population.

On March 3, 1865, the Freedmen's Bureau Bill became law, sponsored by the Republicans to aid freedmen and White refugees. A federal bureau was created to provide food, clothing, fuel, and advice on negotiating labor contracts. It attempted to oversee new relations between freedmen and their former masters in a free labor market. The act, without deference to a person's color, authorized the bureau to lease confiscated land for a period of three years and to sell it in portions of up to 40 acres (16 ha) per buyer. The bureau was to expire one year after the termination of the war. Lincoln was assassinated before he could appoint a commissioner of the bureau.

With the help of the bureau, the recently freed slaves began voting, forming political parties, and assuming the control of labor in many areas. The bureau helped to start a change of power in the South that drew national attention from the Republicans in the North to the Democrats in the South. Even with the benefits that it gave to the freedmen, the Freedmen's Bureau was unable to operate effectively in certain areas. Terrorizing freedmen for trying to vote, hold a political office, or own land, the Ku Klux Klan was the nemesis of the Freedmen's Bureau.

=== Bans on color discrimination ===
Other legislation was signed that broadened equality and rights for African Americans. Lincoln outlawed discrimination on account of color, in carrying U.S. mail, in riding on public street cars in Washington, D.C., and in pay for soldiers.

=== February 1865 peace conference ===
Lincoln and Secretary of State William H. Seward met with three Southern representatives to discuss the peaceful Reconstruction of the Union and the Confederacy on February 3, 1865, in Hampton Roads, Virginia. The Southern delegation included Confederate Vice President Alexander H. Stephens, John Archibald Campbell, and Robert M. T. Hunter. The Southerners proposed the Union recognition of the Confederacy, a joint Union–Confederate attack on Mexico to oust Emperor Maximilian I, and an alternative subordinate status of servitude for Blacks rather than slavery. Lincoln flatly rejected recognition of the Confederacy and said that the slaves covered by his Emancipation Proclamation would not be re-enslaved. He said that the Union states were about to pass the Thirteenth Amendment, outlawing slavery. Lincoln urged the governor of Georgia to remove Confederate troops and "ratify this constitutional amendment prospectively, so as to take effect—say in five years .... Slavery is doomed." Lincoln also urged compensated emancipation for the slaves as he thought the North should be willing to share the costs of freedom. Although the meeting was cordial, the parties did not settle on agreements.

=== Historical legacy debated ===
Lincoln continued to advocate his Louisiana Plan as a model for all states up until his assassination on April 15, 1865. The plan successfully started the Reconstruction process of ratifying the Thirteenth Amendment. Lincoln is typically portrayed as taking the moderate position and fighting the Radical positions. There is considerable debate on how well Lincoln, had he lived, would have handled Congress during the Reconstruction process that took place after the Civil War ended. One historical camp argues that Lincoln's flexibility, pragmatism, and superior political skills with Congress would have solved Reconstruction with far less difficulty. The other camp believes that the Radicals would have attempted to impeach Lincoln, just as they did Johnson in 1868.

== Johnson administration ==
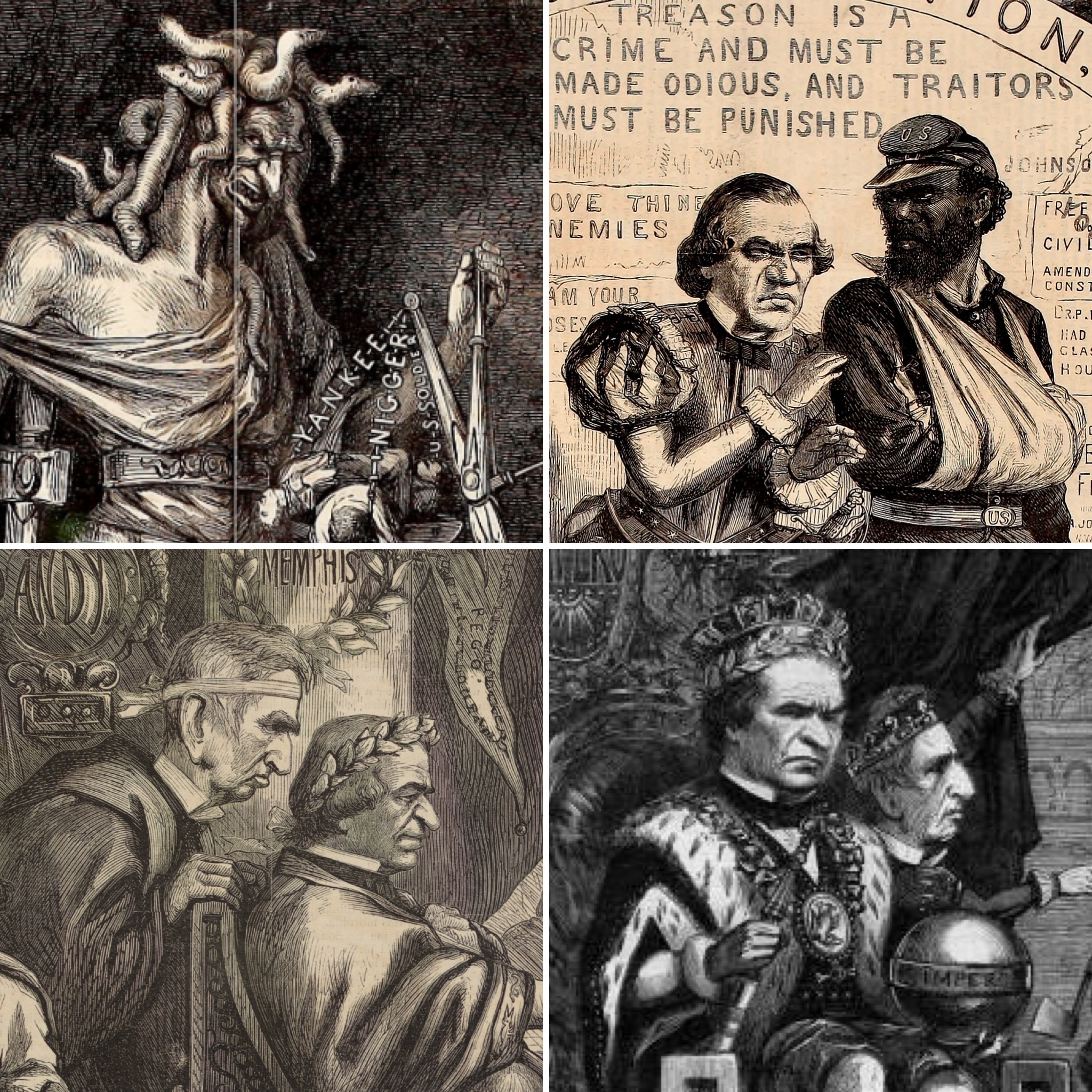
Harper's Weekly cartoonist Thomas Nast regularly skewered Andrew Johnson's reconstruction policies as dangerous and destructive; clockwise from top left: Johnson as a Medusa-headed Lady Justice in Southern Justice, Johnson as Iago to a wounded soldier of the U.S. Colored Troops as Othello, King Andy with "prime minister" Seward, and Johnson as Emperor Nero with Seward in Amphitheatrum Johnsonianum

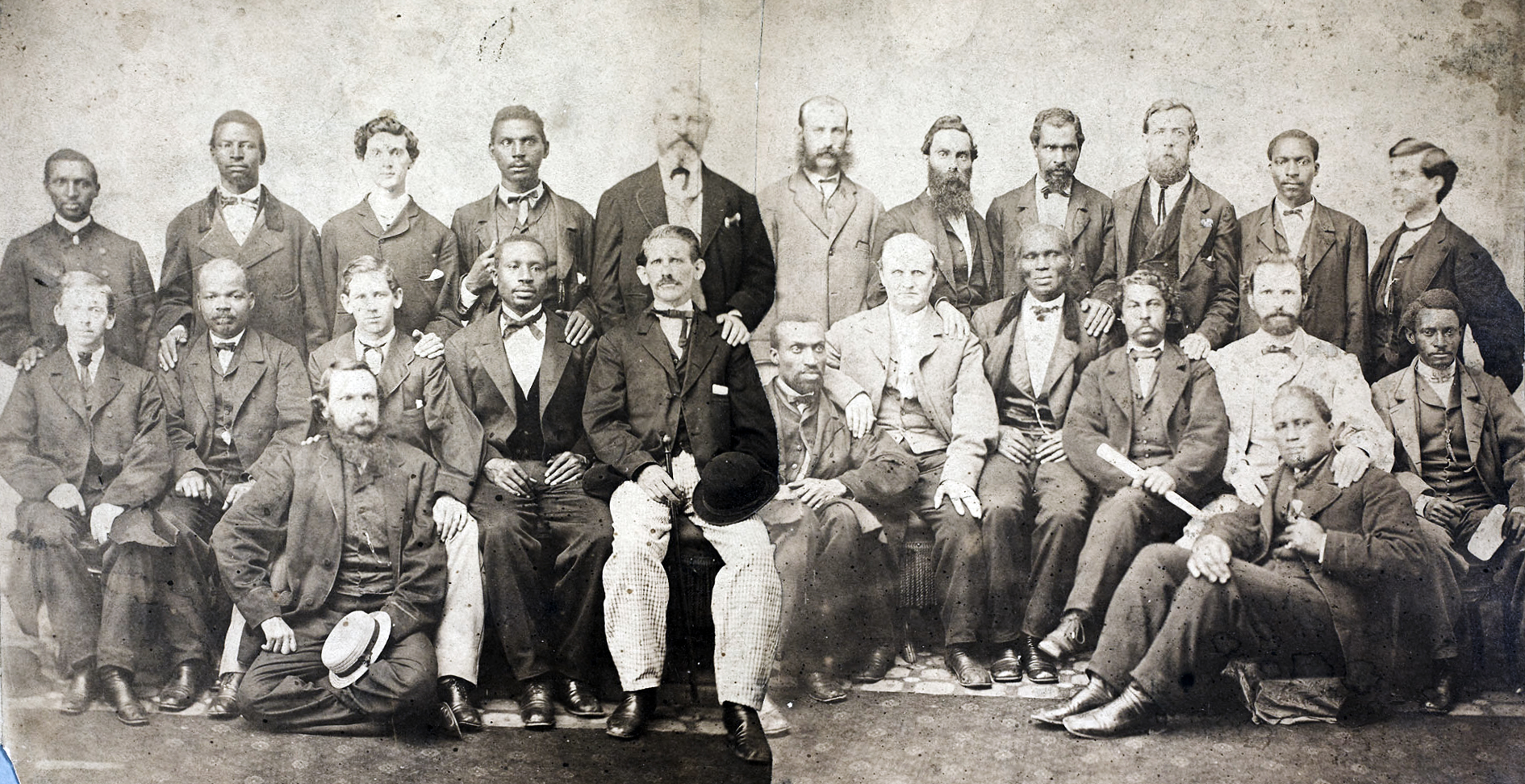
A photograph of the 24 members of the petit jury impaneled in May 1867 by the United States Circuit Court for Virginia in Richmond for the treason trial of former Confederate president Jefferson Davis. Ultimately, the trial did not take place.

Northern anger over the assassination of Lincoln and the immense human cost of the war led to demands for punitive policies. As vice president, Johnson had taken a hard line and spoke of hanging Confederates, but when he succeeded Lincoln as president, Johnson took a much softer position, pardoning many Confederate leaders and other former Confederates. Former Confederate President Jefferson Davis was held in prison for two years, but other Confederate leaders were not. Though a jury was temporarily empaneled, there were no trials on charges of treason. Three people—Captain Henry Wirz, the commandant of the prison camp in Andersonville, Georgia, and guerilla leaders Champ Ferguson and Henry C. Magruder—were executed for war crimes. Johnson's racist view of Reconstruction did not include the involvement of blacks in government, and he refused to heed Northern concerns when Southern state legislatures implemented Black Codes that set the status of the freedmen much lower than that of white people.

Smith argues "Johnson attempted to carry forward what he considered to be Lincoln's plans for Reconstruction." McKitrick says that in 1865 Johnson had strong support in the Republican Party, saying: "It was naturally from the great moderate sector of Unionist opinion in the North that Johnson could draw his greatest comfort." Ray Allen Billington says: "One faction, the moderate Republicans under the leadership of Presidents Abraham Lincoln and Andrew Johnson, favored a mild policy toward the South." David A. Lincove, citing Lincoln biographers James G. Randall and Richard N. Current, argues:

It is likely that had he lived, Lincoln would have followed a policy similar to Johnson's, that he would have clashed with congressional Radicals, that he would have produced a better result for the freedmen than occurred, and that his political skills would have helped him avoid Johnson's mistakes.

Historians generally agree that Johnson was an inept politician who lost all his advantages by unskilled maneuvering. He broke with Congress in early 1866 and then became defiant and tried to block enforcement of Reconstruction laws passed by the U.S. Congress. He was in constant conflict constitutionally with the Radicals in Congress over the status of freedmen and whites in the defeated South. Although resigned to the abolition of slavery, many former Confederates were unwilling to accept both social changes and political domination by former slaves. In the words of Benjamin Franklin Perry, Johnson's choice as the provisional governor of South Carolina: "First, the Negro is to be invested with all political power, and then the antagonism of interest between capital and labor is to work out the result."

However, the fears of the planter elite and other leading white citizens were partly assuaged by the actions of Johnson, who ensured that a wholesale land redistribution from the planters to the freedmen did not occur. Johnson ordered that confiscated or abandoned lands administered by the Freedmen's Bureau would not be redistributed to the freedmen but would be returned to pardoned owners. Land was returned that would have been forfeited under the Confiscation Acts passed by Congress in 1861 and 1862. Johnson repudiated Sherman's Special Field Order Number 15, the source of the "40 acres and a mule" promise of reparations for former slaves.

=== Freedmen and the enactment of Black Codes ===
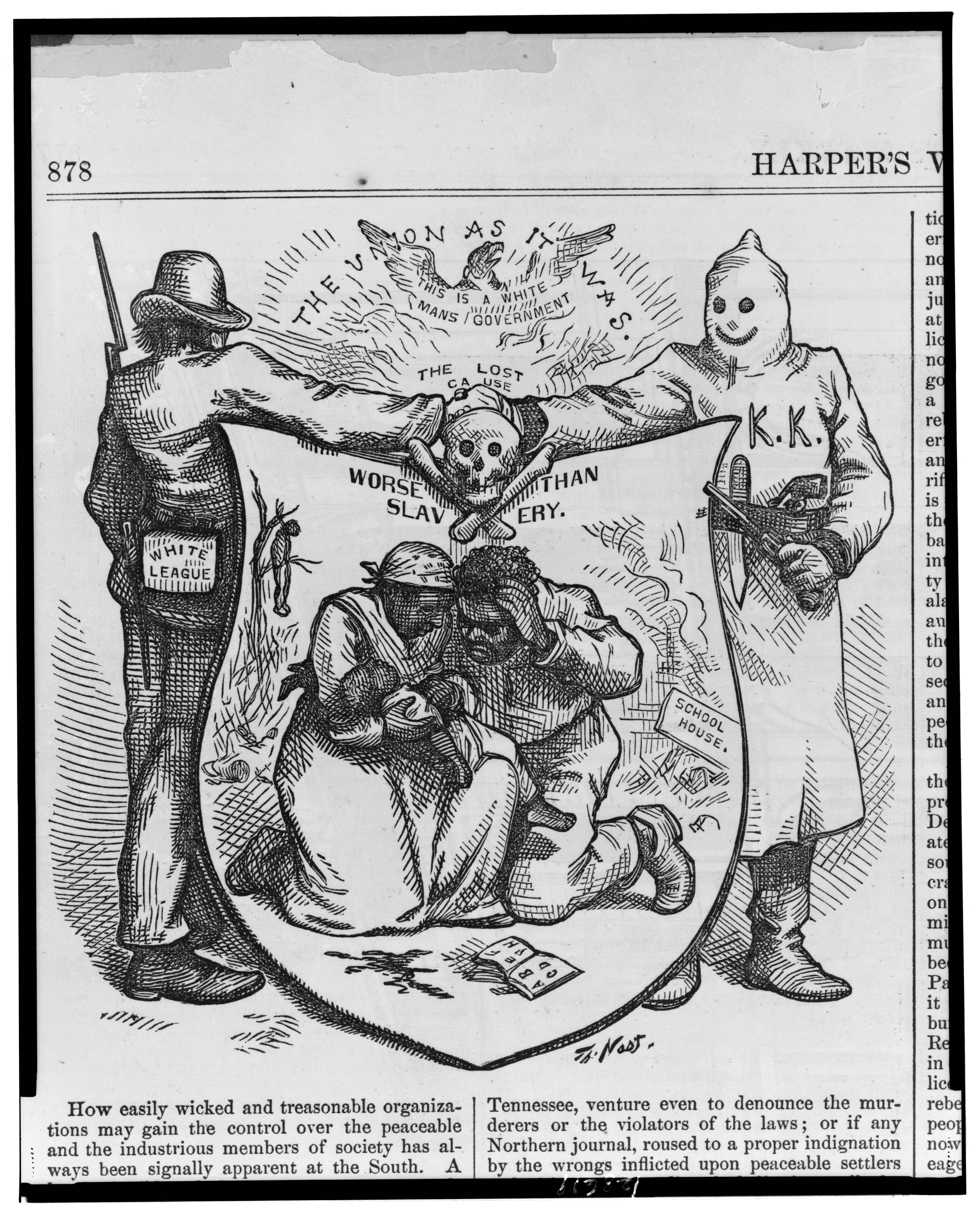
An October 24th, 1874 Harper's Magazine editorial cartoon by Thomas Nast denouncing KKK and White League murders of innocent Blacks

Southern state governments quickly enacted the restrictive "Black Codes". However, they were abolished in 1866 and seldom had effect, because the Freedmen's Bureau (not the local courts) handled the legal affairs of freedmen.

The Black Codes indicated the plans of the Southern whites for the former slaves. The freedmen would have more rights than did free Blacks before the war, but they would still have only second-class civil rights, no voting rights, and no citizenship. They could not own firearms, serve on a jury in a lawsuit involving whites, or move about without employment. The Black Codes outraged Northern opinion. They were overthrown by the Civil Rights Act of 1866 that gave the freedmen more legal equality (although still without the right to vote).

The freedmen, with the strong backing of the Freedmen's Bureau, rejected gang labor work patterns that had been used in slavery. Instead of gang labor, freed people preferred family-based labor groups. They forced planters to bargain for their labor. Such bargaining soon led to the establishment of the system of sharecropping, which gave the freedmen greater economic independence and social autonomy than gang labor. However, because they lacked capital and the planters continued to own the means of production (tools, draft animals, and land), the freedmen were forced into producing cash crops (mainly cotton) for the land owners and merchants, and they entered into a crop-lien system. Widespread poverty, disruption to an agricultural economy too dependent on cotton, and the falling price of cotton led within decades to the routine indebtedness of the majority of the freedmen, and the poverty of many planters.

Northern officials gave varying reports on conditions for the freedmen in the South. One harsh assessment came from Carl Schurz, who reports on the situation in the states along the Gulf Coast. His report documents dozens of extrajudicial killings and claims that hundreds or thousands more African Americans were killed:

The number of murders and assaults perpetrated upon Negroes is very great; we can form only an approximative estimate of what is going on in those parts of the South which are not closely garrisoned, and from which no regular reports are received, by what occurs under the very eyes of our military authorities. As to my personal experience, I will only mention that during my two days sojourn at Atlanta, one Negro was stabbed with fatal effect on the street, and three were poisoned, one of whom died. While I was at Montgomery, one Negro was cut across the throat evidently with intent to kill, and another was shot, but both escaped with their lives. Several papers attached to this report give an account of the number of capital cases that occurred at certain places during a certain period of time. It is a sad fact that the perpetration of those acts is not confined to that class of people which might be called the rabble.

The report includes sworn testimony from soldiers and officials of the Freedmen's Bureau. In Selma, Alabama, Major J. P. Houston noted that whites who killed 12 African Americans in his district never came to trial. Many more killings never became official cases. Captain Poillon describes white patrols in southwestern Alabama:

who board some of the boats; after the boats leave they hang, shoot, or drown the victims they may find on them, and all those found on the roads or coming down the rivers are almost invariably murdered. The bewildered and terrified freedmen know not what to do—to leave is death; to remain is to suffer the increased burden imposed upon them by the cruel taskmaster, whose only interest is their labor, wrung from them by every device an inhuman ingenuity can devise; hence the lash and murder is resorted to intimidate those whom fear of an awful death alone cause to remain, while patrols, Negro dogs and spies, disguised as Yankees, keep constant guard over these unfortunate people.

Much of the violence that was perpetrated against African Americans was shaped by gender prejudices regarding African Americans. Black women were in a particularly vulnerable situation. To convict a white man of sexually assaulting Black women in this period was exceedingly difficult. The South's judicial system had been wholly refigured to make one of its primary purposes the coercion of African Americans to comply with the social customs and labor demands of whites. Trials were discouraged and attorneys for Black misdemeanor defendants were difficult to find. The goal of county courts was a fast, uncomplicated trial with a resulting conviction. Most Blacks were unable to pay their fines or bail, and "the most common penalty was nine months to a year in a slave mine or lumber camp". The South's judicial system was rigged to generate fees and claim bounties, not to ensure public protection. Black women were socially perceived as sexually avaricious and since they were portrayed as having little virtue, society held that they could not be raped. One report indicates two freed women, Frances Thompson and Lucy Smith, described their violent sexual assault during the Memphis Riots of 1866. However, Black women were vulnerable even in times of relative normalcy. Sexual assaults on African-American women were so pervasive, particularly on the part of their white employers, that Black men sought to reduce the contact between white males and Black females by having the women in their family avoid doing work that was closely overseen by whites. Black men were construed as being extremely sexually aggressive and their supposed or rumored threats to white women were often used as a pretext for lynching and castrations.

=== Moderate responses ===
During fall 1865, out of response to the Black Codes and worrisome signs of Southern recalcitrance, the Radical Republicans blocked the readmission of the former rebellious states to the Congress. Johnson, however, was content with allowing former Confederate states into the Union as long as their state governments adopted the Thirteenth Amendment abolishing slavery. By December 6, 1865, the amendment was ratified, and Johnson considered Reconstruction over. According to James Schouler writing in 1913, Johnson was following the moderate Lincoln presidential Reconstruction policy to get the states readmitted as soon as possible.

Congress, controlled by the Radicals, had other plans. The Radicals were led by Charles Sumner in the Senate and Thaddeus Stevens in the House of Representatives. Congress, on December 4, 1865, rejected Johnson's moderate presidential Reconstruction, and organized the Joint Committee on Reconstruction, a 15-member panel to devise Reconstruction requirements for the Southern states to be restored to the Union.

In January 1866, Congress renewed the Freedmen's Bureau; however, Johnson vetoed the Freedmen's Bureau Bill in February 1866. Although Johnson had sympathy for the plight of the freedmen, he was against federal assistance. An attempt to override the veto failed on February 20, 1866. This veto shocked the congressional Radicals. In response, both the Senate and House passed a joint resolution not to allow any senator or representative seat admittance until Congress decided when Reconstruction was finished.

Senator Lyman Trumbull of Illinois, leader of the moderate Republicans, took affront to the Black Codes. He proposed the first Civil Rights Act, because the abolition of slavery was empty if:

laws are to be enacted and enforced depriving persons of African descent of privileges which are essential to freemen .... A law that does not allow a colored person to go from one county to another, and one that does not allow him to hold property, to teach, to preach, are certainly laws in violation of the rights of a freeman .... The purpose of this bill is to destroy all these discriminations.

The key to the bill was the opening section:

All persons born in the United States ... are hereby declared to be citizens of the United States; and such citizens of every race and color, without regard to any previous condition of slavery ... shall have the same right in every State ... to make and enforce contracts, to sue, be parties, and give evidence, to inherit, purchase, lease, sell, hold, and convey real and personal property, and to full and equal benefit of all laws and proceedings for the security of person and property, as is enjoyed by white citizens, and shall be subject to like punishment, pains, and penalties and to none other, any law, statute, ordinance, regulation, or custom to the Contrary notwithstanding.

The bill did not give freedmen the right to vote. Congress quickly passed the Civil Rights Bill; the Senate on February 2 voted 33–12; the House on March 13 voted 111–38.

=== Johnson's vetoes ===
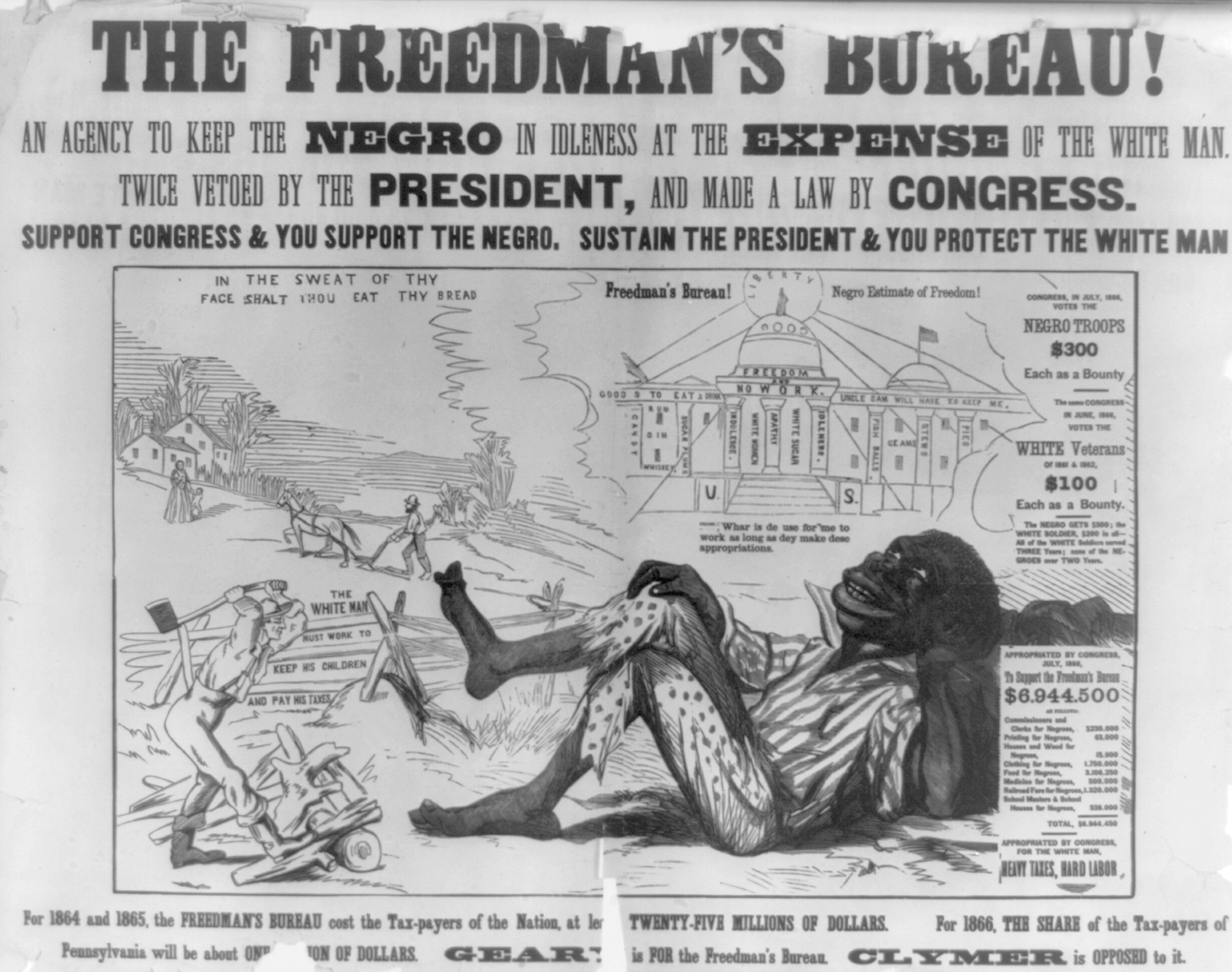
The debate over Reconstruction and the Freedmen's Bureau was nationwide. This 1866 Pennsylvania election poster alleged that the bureau kept the Negro in idleness at the expense of the hardworking white taxpayer. A racist caricature of an African American is depicted.

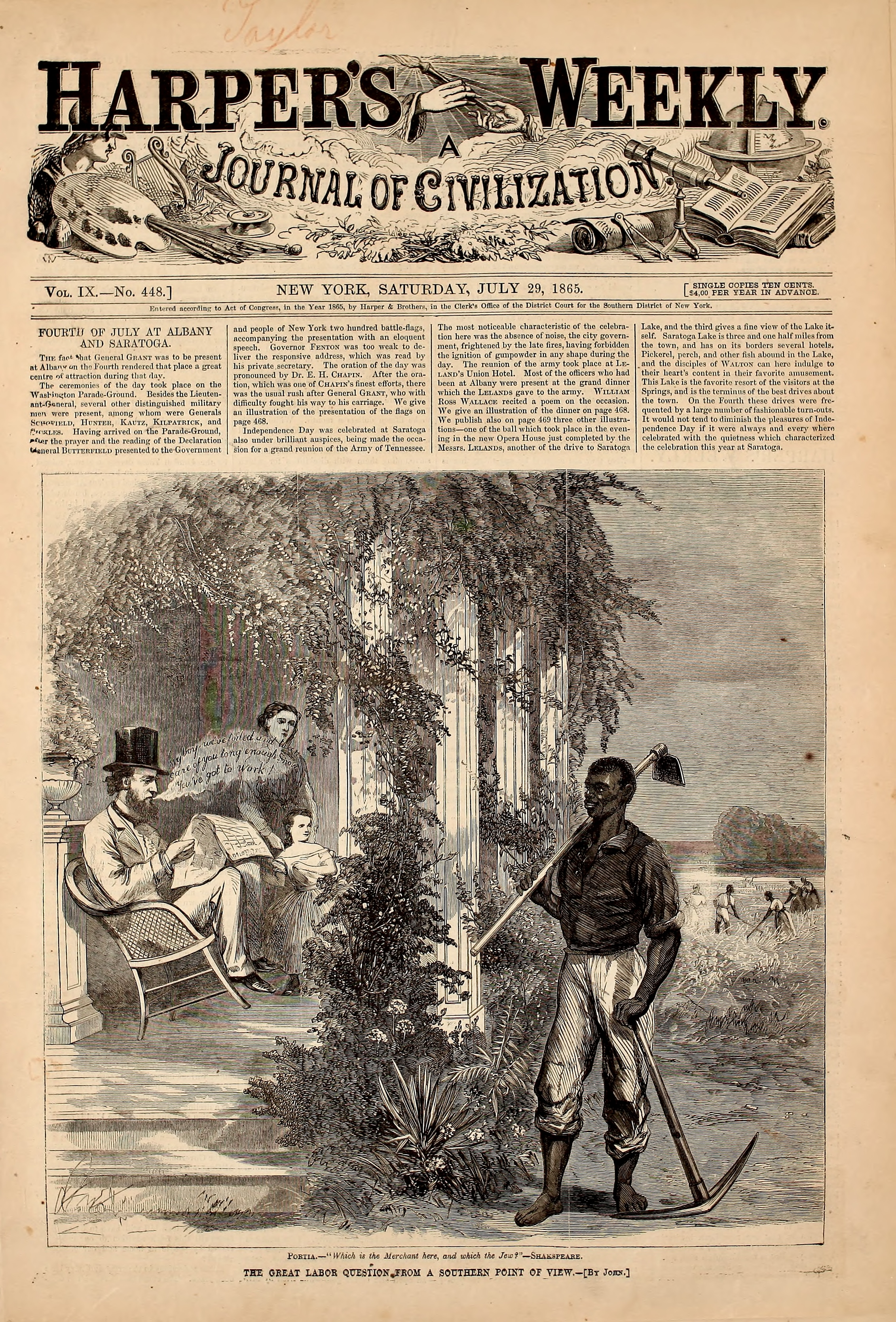
Harper's Weekly cover of July 29, 1865; the text in the planter's speech balloon reads "My boy, we've toiled and taken care of you long enough. Now you've got to work!"

Although strongly urged by moderates in Congress to sign the Civil Rights bill, Johnson broke decisively with them by vetoing it on March 27. His veto message objected to the measure because it conferred citizenship on the freedmen at a time when 11 out of 36 states were unrepresented and attempted to fix by federal law "a perfect equality of the white and black races in every state of the Union". Johnson said it was an invasion by federal authority of the rights of the states; it had no warrant in the Constitution and was contrary to all precedents. It was a "stride toward centralization and the concentration of all legislative power in the national government".

The Democratic Party, proclaiming itself the party of white men, North and South, supported Johnson. However, the Republicans in Congress overrode his veto (the Senate by the close vote of 33–15, and the House by 122–41), and the civil rights bill became law. Congress also passed a watered-down Freedmen's Bureau bill; Johnson vetoed it as he had done to the previous bill. Once again, however, Congress had enough support and overrode Johnson's veto.

The last moderate proposal was the Fourteenth Amendment, whose principal drafter was Representative John Bingham. It was designed to put the key provisions of the Civil Rights Act into the Constitution, but it went much further. It extended citizenship to everyone born in the United States (except Indians on reservations), penalized states that did not give the vote to freedmen, and most important, created new federal civil rights that could be protected by federal courts. It guaranteed the federal war debt would be paid (and promised the Confederate debt would never be paid). Johnson used his influence to block the amendment in the states since three-fourths of the states were required for ratification (the amendment was later ratified). The moderate effort to compromise with Johnson had failed, and a political fight broke out between the Republicans (both Radical and moderate) on one side, and on the other side, Johnson and his allies in the Democratic Party in the North, and the groupings (which used different names) in each Southern state.

== Congressional moves ==
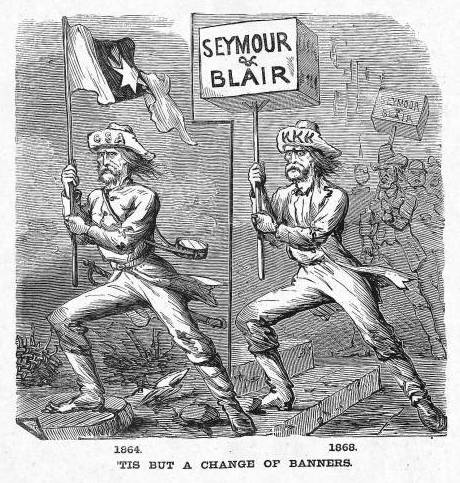
1868 Republican cartoon identifies Democratic candidates Seymour and Blair (right) with KKK violence and with Confederate soldiers (left).

Concerned by multiple reports of abuse of black freedmen by Southern white officials and plantation owners, Republicans in Congress took control of Reconstruction policies after the election of 1866. Johnson ignored the policy mandate, and he openly encouraged Southern states to deny ratification of the Fourteenth Amendment (except for Tennessee, all former Confederate states did refuse to ratify, as did the border states of Delaware, Maryland, and Kentucky). Radical Republicans in Congress, led by Stevens and Sumner, opened the way to suffrage for male freedmen. They were generally in control, although they had to compromise with the moderate Republicans (the Democrats in Congress had almost no power). Historians refer to this period as "Radical Reconstruction" or "congressional Reconstruction". The business spokesmen in the North generally opposed Radical proposals. Analysis of 34 major business newspapers showed that 12 discussed politics, and only one, Iron Age, supported radicalism. The other 11 opposed a "harsh" Reconstruction policy, favored the speedy return of the Southern states to congressional representation, opposed legislation designed to protect the freedmen, and deplored the impeachment of Johnson.

The South's White leaders, who held power in the immediate post-bellum era before the vote was granted to the freedmen, renounced secession and slavery, but not White supremacy. People who had previously held power were angered in 1867 when new elections were held. New Republican lawmakers were elected by a coalition of White Unionists, freedmen and Northerners who had settled in the South. Some leaders in the South tried to accommodate new conditions.

=== Constitutional amendments ===
Three constitutional amendments, known as the Reconstruction amendments, were adopted. The Thirteenth Amendment abolishing slavery was ratified in 1865. The Fourteenth Amendment was proposed in 1866 and ratified in 1868, guaranteeing United States citizenship to all persons born or naturalized in the United States and granting them federal civil rights. The Fifteenth Amendment, proposed in 1869 and passed in 1870, decrees that the right to vote could not be denied because of "race, color, or previous condition of servitude". Left unaffected was that states would still determine voter registration and electoral laws. The amendments were directed at ending slavery and providing full citizenship to freedmen. Many northern congressmen believed that providing Black men with the right to vote would be the most rapid means of political education and training. Some viewed it as a panacea to resolve freedman's strife while relieving northerners of their responsibility of defending them.

Many Blacks took an active part in voting and political life, and built churches and community organizations. Following Reconstruction, White Democrats and insurgent groups used force to regain power in the state legislatures and pass laws that effectively disenfranchised most Blacks and many poor Whites in the South. From 1890 to 1910, Southern states passed new state constitutions that completed the disenfranchisement of Blacks. U.S. Supreme Court rulings on these provisions upheld many of these new Southern state constitutions and laws, and most Blacks were prevented from voting in the South until the 1960s. Full federal enforcement of the Fourteenth and Fifteenth Amendments did not reoccur until after passage of legislation in the mid-1960s as a result of the civil rights movement.

=== Statutes ===
The Reconstruction Acts, as originally passed, were initially called "An act to provide for the more efficient Government of the Rebel States". The legislation was enacted by the 39th Congress, on March 2, 1867. It was vetoed by Johnson, and the veto was overridden by a two-thirds majority in both the House and the Senate the same day. Congress also clarified the scope of the federal writ of habeas corpus, to allow federal courts to vacate unlawful state court convictions or sentences, in 1867.

=== Military districts ===
Map of the five Reconstruction military districts First Military District Second Military District Third Military District Fourth Military District Fifth Military District

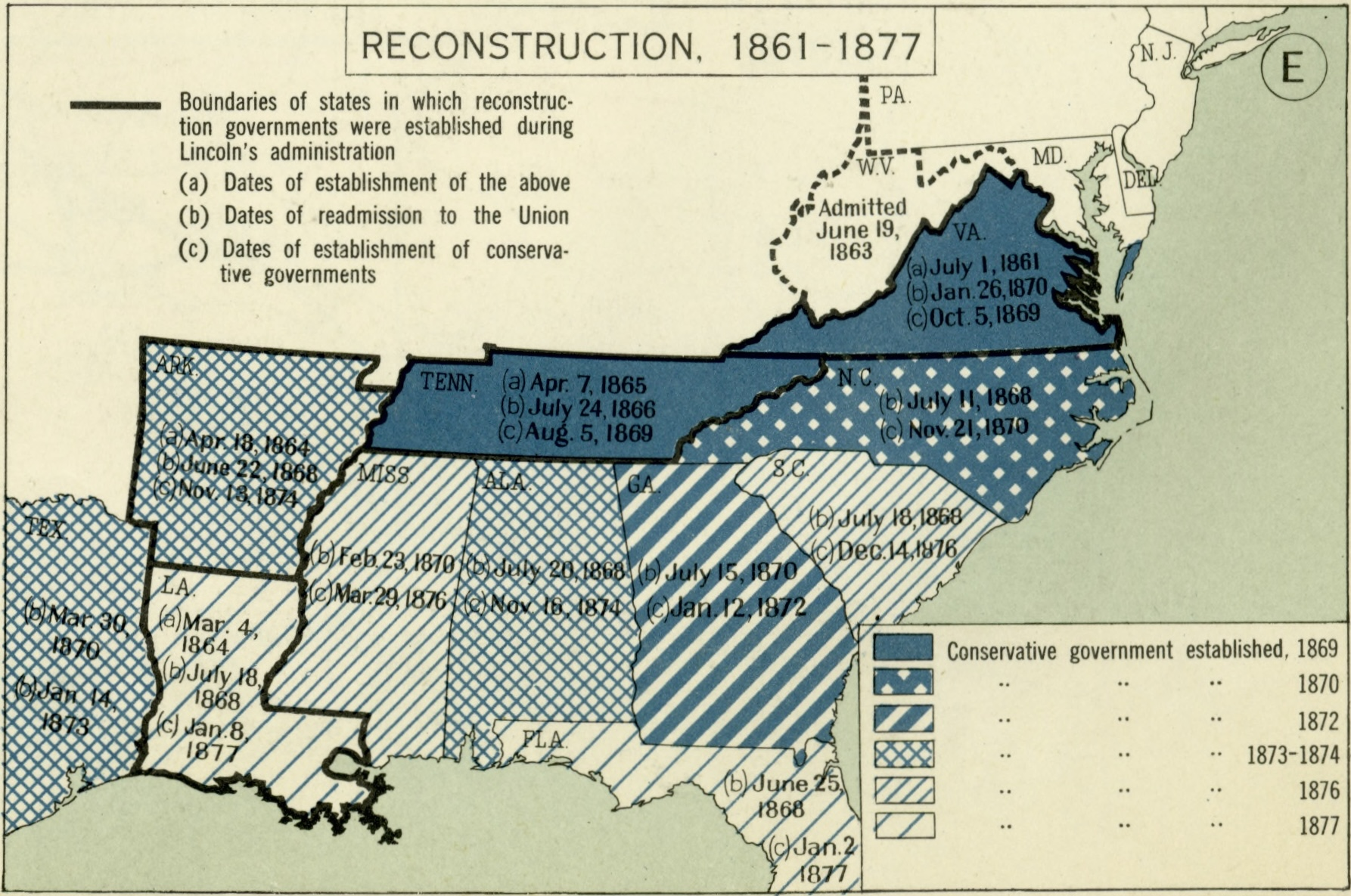
Map of Reconstruction in the United States, 1861–1877

With the Radicals in control, Congress passed the Reconstruction Acts on July 19, 1867. The first Reconstruction Act, authored by Oregon Senator George Henry Williams, placed 10 of the former Confederate states—all but Tennessee—under military control, grouping them into five military districts:

- First Military District: Virginia, under General John Schofield
- Second Military District: North Carolina and South Carolina, under General Daniel Sickles
- Third Military District: Georgia, Alabama, and Florida, under Generals John Pope and George Meade
- Fourth Military District: Arkansas and Mississippi, under General Edward Ord
- Fifth Military District: Texas and Louisiana, under Generals Philip Sheridan and Winfield Scott Hancock

To enforce the act, 20,000 U.S. troops were deployed.

The five border states that had not joined the Confederacy were not subject to military Reconstruction. West Virginia, which had seceded from Virginia in 1863, and Tennessee, which had already been re-admitted in 1866, were not included in the military districts. Federal troops, however, were kept in West Virginia through 1868 in order to control civil unrest in several areas throughout the state. Federal troops were removed from Kentucky and Missouri in 1866.

The 10 state governments were re-constituted under the direct control of the United States Army. One major purpose was to recognize and protect the right of African Americans to vote. There was little to no combat, but rather a state of martial law in which the military closely supervised local government, supervised elections, and tried to protect office holders and freedmen from violence. Blacks were enrolled as voters; former Confederate leaders were excluded for a limited period. No one state was entirely representative. Randolph Campbell describes what happened in Texas:

The first critical step ... was the registration of voters according to guidelines established by Congress and interpreted by Generals Sheridan and Charles Griffin. The Reconstruction Acts called for registering all adult males, white and black, except those who had ever sworn an oath to uphold the Constitution of the United States and then engaged in rebellion .... Sheridan interpreted these restrictions stringently, barring from registration not only all pre-1861 officials of state and local governments who had supported the Confederacy but also all city officeholders and even minor functionaries such as sextons of cemeteries. In May Griffin ... appointed a three-man board of registrars for each county, making his choices on the advice of known scalawags and local Freedmen's Bureau agents. In every county where practicable a freedman served as one of the three registrars .... Final registration amounted to approximately 59,633 whites and 49,479 blacks. It is impossible to say how many whites were rejected or refused to register (estimates vary from 7,500 to 12,000), but blacks, who constituted only about 30 percent of the state's population, were significantly over-represented at 45 percent of all voters.

=== State constitutional conventions: 1867–1869 ===
The 11 states held constitutional conventions giving Black men the right to vote, where the factions divided into the Radical, "conservative", and in-between delegates. The Radicals were a coalition: 40% were Southern White Republicans; 25% were White and 34% were Black. In addition to expanding the franchise, they pressed for provisions designed to promote economic growth, especially financial aid to rebuild the ruined railroad system. The conventions set up systems of free public schools funded by tax dollars but did not require them to be racially integrated.

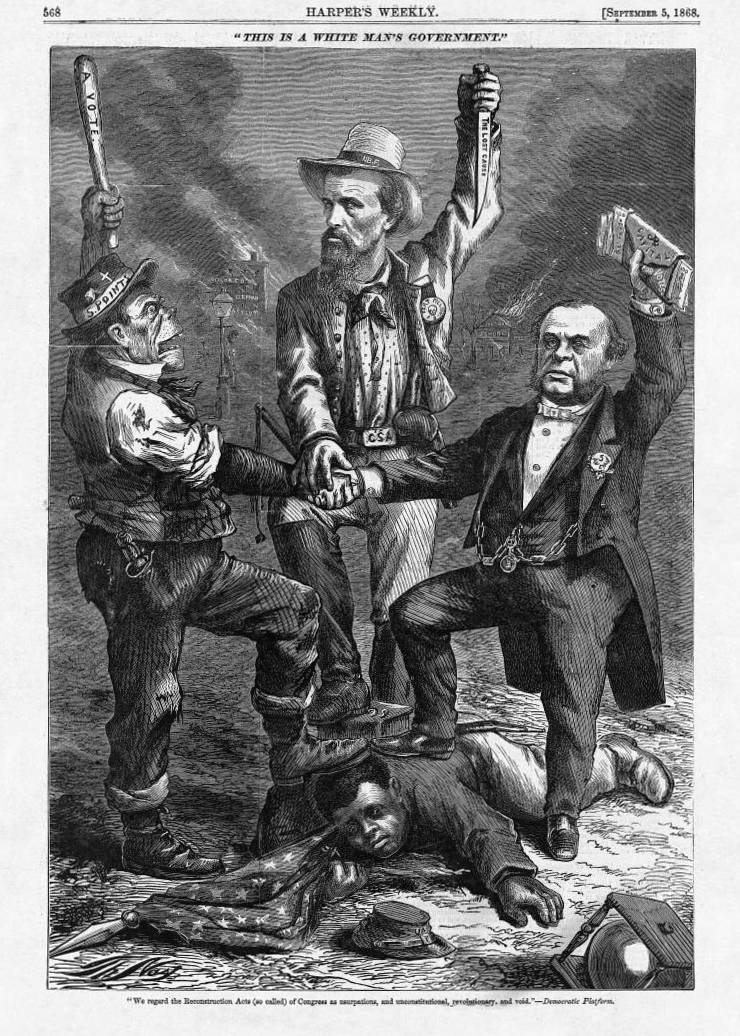
"This is a white man's government", Thomas Nast's caricature of the forces arraigned against Grant and Reconstruction in the 1868 election. Atop a black Union veteran reaching for a ballot box: the New York City Irish; Confederate and Klansman Nathan Bedford Forrest; and big-money Democratic Party chairman August Belmont, a burning freedmen's school in the background. Harper's Weekly, September 5, 1868.

Until 1872, most former Confederate or prewar Southern office holders were disqualified from voting or holding office; all but 500 top Confederate leaders were pardoned by the Amnesty Act of 1872. "Proscription" was the policy of disqualifying as many ex-Confederates as possible. For example, in 1865 Tennessee had disenfranchised 80,000 ex-Confederates. However, proscription was soundly rejected by the Black element, which insisted on universal suffrage. The issue would come up repeatedly in several states, especially in Texas and Virginia. In Virginia, an effort was made to disqualify for public office every man who had served in the Confederate Army even as a private, and any civilian farmer who sold food to the Confederate States Army. Disenfranchising Southern Whites was also opposed by moderate Republicans in the North who felt that ending proscription would bring the South closer to a republican form of government based on the consent of the governed, as called for by the Constitution and the Declaration of Independence. Strong measures that were called for in order to forestall a return to the defunct Confederacy increasingly seemed out of place, and the role of the United States Army and controlling politics in the state was troublesome. Historian Mark Summers states that increasingly "the disenfranchisers had to fall back on the contention that denial of the vote was meant as punishment, and a lifelong punishment at that ... Month by month, the un-republican character of the regime looked more glaring."

=== Election of 1868 ===
During the Civil War, many in the North believed that fighting for the Union was a noble cause—for the preservation of the Union and the end of slavery. After the war ended, with the North victorious, the fear among Radicals was that Johnson too quickly assumed that slavery and Confederate nationalism were dead and that the Southern states could return. The Radicals sought out a candidate for president who represented their viewpoint.

In May 1868, the Republicans unanimously chose Ulysses S. Grant as their presidential candidate and Schuyler Colfax as their vice-presidential candidate. Grant won favor with the Radicals after he allowed Edwin Stanton, a Radical, to be reinstated as secretary of war. As early as 1862, during the Civil War, Grant had appointed the Ohio military chaplain John Eaton to protect and gradually incorporate refugee slaves in west Tennessee and northern Mississippi into the Union war effort and pay them for their labor. It was the beginning of his vision for the Freedmen's Bureau. Grant opposed Johnson by supporting the Reconstruction Acts passed by the Radicals.

In northern cities Grant contended with a strong immigrant, and particularly in New York City an Irish, anti-Reconstructionist Democratic bloc. Republicans sought to make inroads campaigning for the Irish taken prisoner in the Fenian raids into Canada and calling on the Johnson administration to recognize a lawful state of war between Ireland and England. In 1867 Grant personally intervened with David Bell and Michael Scanlon to move their paper, the Irish Republic, articulate in its support for black equality, to New York from Chicago.

The Democrats, having abandoned Johnson, nominated former governor Horatio Seymour of New York for president and Francis P. Blair of Missouri for vice president. The Democrats advocated the immediate restoration of former Confederate states to the Union and amnesty from "all past political offenses".

Grant won the popular vote by 300,000 votes out of 5,716,082 votes cast, receiving an Electoral College landslide of 214 votes to Seymour's 80. Seymour received a majority of white votes, but Grant was aided by 500,000 votes cast by blacks, winning him 52.7 percent of the popular vote. He lost Louisiana and Georgia primarily due to Ku Klux Klan violence against African-American voters. At age 46, Grant was the youngest president yet elected and the first president elected after the nation had outlawed slavery.

== Grant administration ==
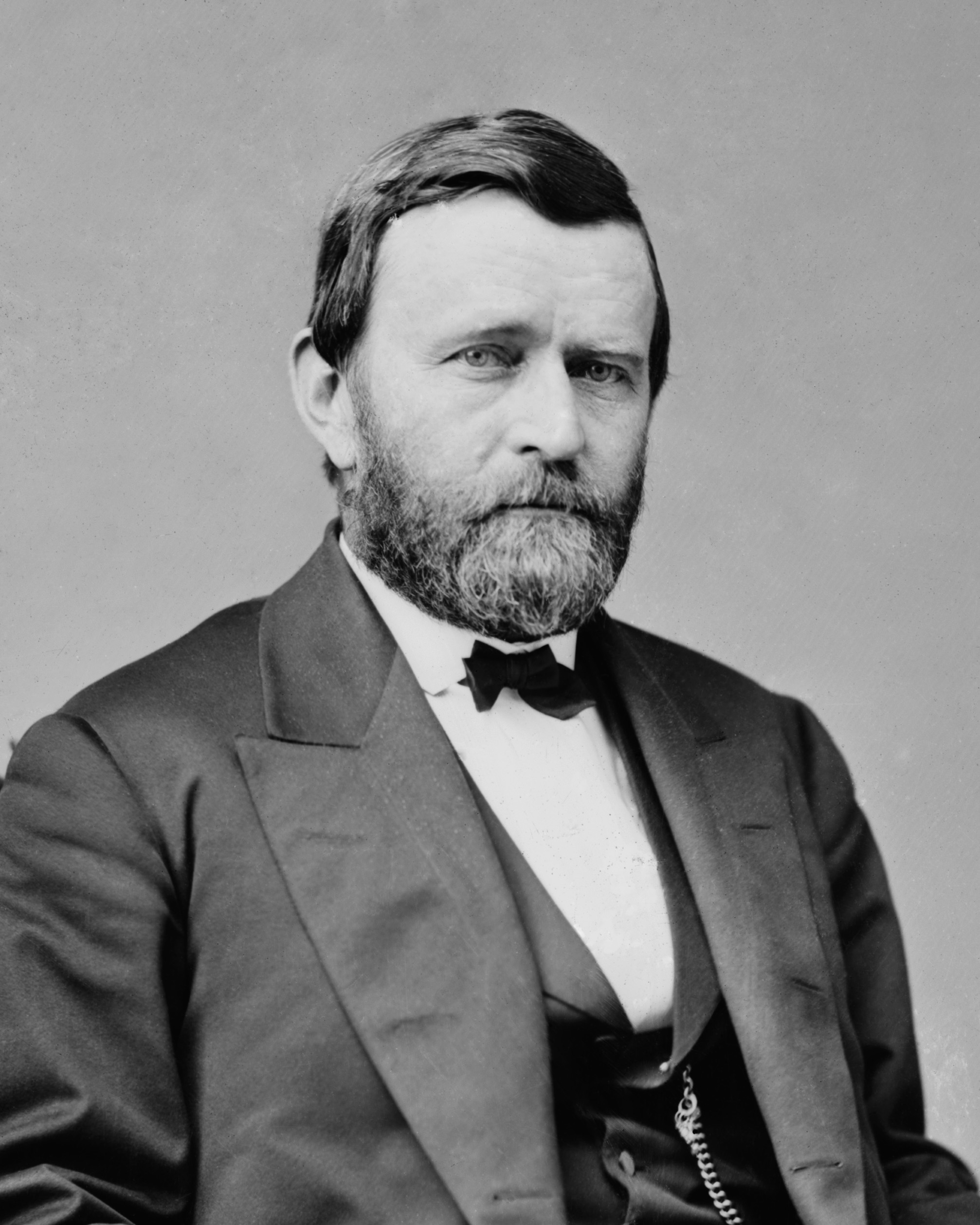
Ulysses S. Grant, 18th President of the United States (1869–1877)

=== Effective civil rights executive ===
Grant was considered an effective civil rights executive, concerned about the plight of African Americans. Grant met with prominent black leaders for consultation and signed a bill into law, on March 18, 1869, that guaranteed equal rights to both blacks and whites, to serve on juries, and hold office, in Washington D.C. In 1870 Grant signed into law a Naturalization Act that opened a path to citizenship for foreign-born Black residents in the US. Additionally, Grant's Postmaster General John Creswell used his patronage powers to integrate the postal system and appointed a record number of African-American men and women as postal workers across the nation, while also expanding many of the mail routes. Grant appointed Republican abolitionist and champion of black education Hugh Lennox Bond as U.S. Circuit Court judge.

=== Final three Reconstruction states admitted ===
Immediately upon inauguration in 1869, Grant bolstered Reconstruction by prodding Congress to readmit Virginia, Mississippi, and Texas into the Union, while ensuring their state constitutions protected every citizen's voting rights.

Grant advocated the ratification of the Fifteenth Amendment that said states could not disenfranchise African Americans. Within a year, the three states adopted the amendment and were admitted to Congress. Grant put military pressure on Georgia to reinstate its black legislators and adopt the amendment. Georgia complied, and on February 24, 1871, its senators were seated in Congress, with all the former Confederate states represented. Southern Reconstructed states were controlled by Republicans and former slaves. By 1877 the Democratic Party had full control of the region, and Reconstruction was dead.

=== Department of Justice created ===
In 1870, to enforce Reconstruction, Congress and Grant created the Justice Department that allowed Attorney General Amos T. Akerman and the first Solicitor General Benjamin Bristow to prosecute the Klan. In Grant's two terms he strengthened Washington's legal capabilities to directly intervene to protect citizenship rights even if the states ignored the problem.

=== Enforcement Acts (1870–1871) ===
Congress and Grant passed three powerful civil rights Enforcement Acts between 1870 and 1871, designed to protect blacks and Reconstruction governments. These were criminal codes that protected the freedmen's right to vote, to hold office, to serve on juries, and receive equal protection of laws. They authorized the federal government to intervene when states did not act. Urged by Grant and Akerman, the strongest of these laws was the Ku Klux Klan Act, passed on April 20, 1871, that authorized the president to impose martial law and suspend the writ of habeas corpus.

Grant was so adamant about the passage of the Ku Klux Klan Act, he earlier had sent a message to Congress, on March 23, 1871, in which he said:

A condition of affairs now exists in some of the States of the Union rendering life and property insecure, and the carrying of the mails and the collection of the revenue dangerous. The proof that such a, condition of affairs exists in some localities is now before the Senate. That the power to correct these evils is beyond the control of State authorities, I do not doubt. That the power of the Executive of the United States, acting within the limits of existing laws, is sufficient for present emergencies, is not clear.

Grant also recommended the enforcement of laws in all parts of the United States to protect life, liberty, and property.

=== Prosecution of the Ku Klux Klan ===
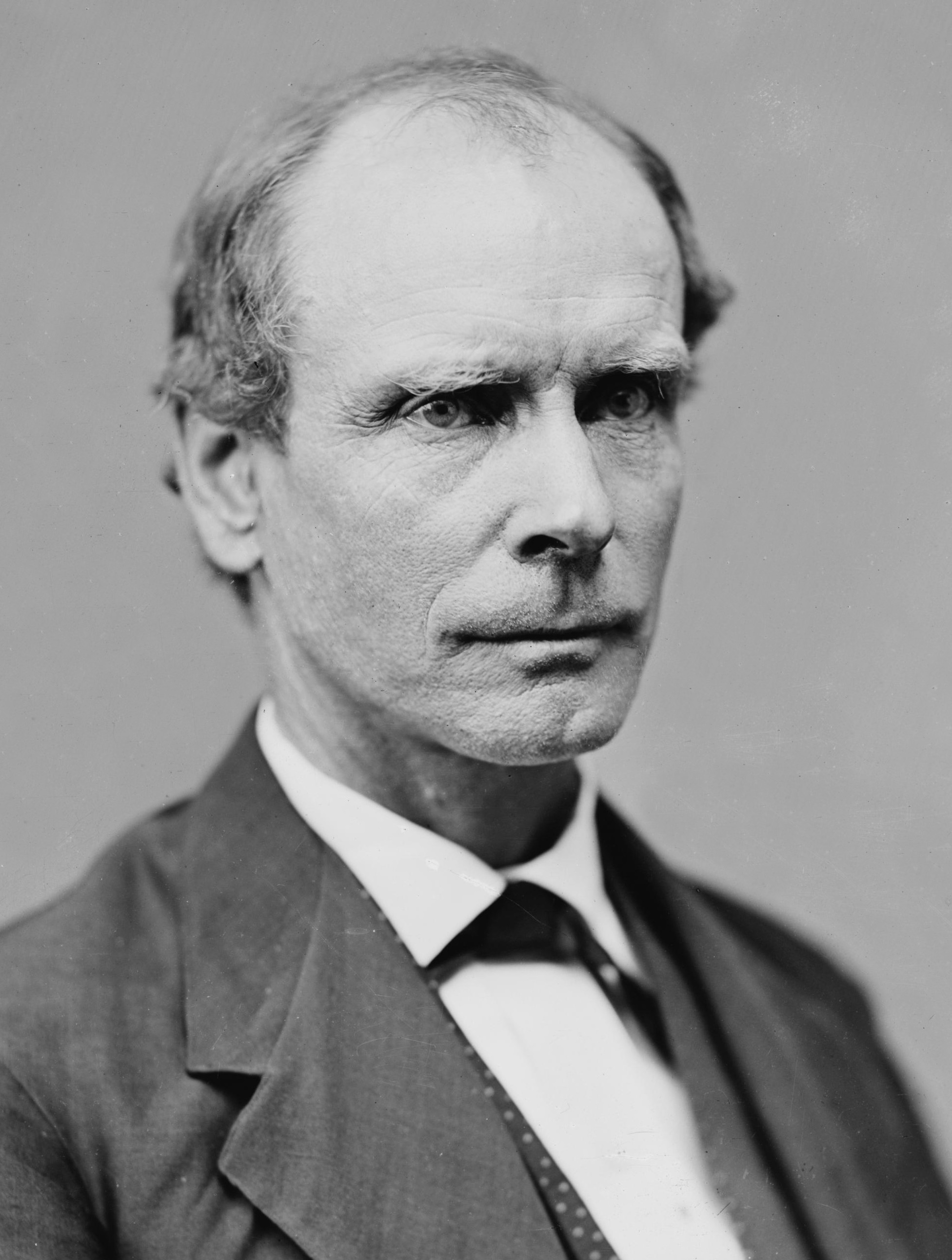
Grant's Attorney General Amos T. Akerman prosecuted the Ku Klux Klan, believing that the strong arm of the federal Justice Department could pacify the South.

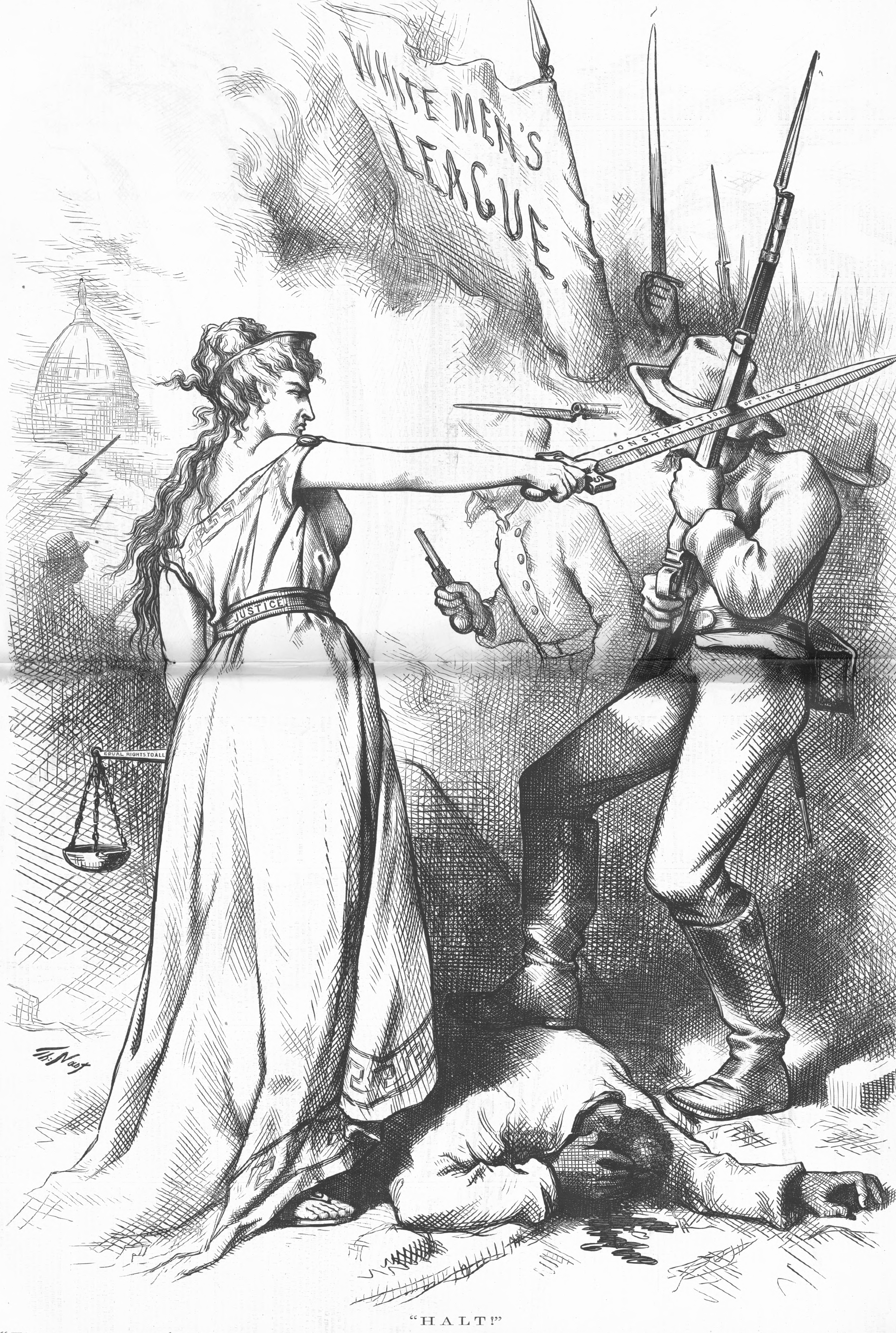
Thomas Nast illustration entitled "Halt", published October 17, 1874

Grant's Justice Department destroyed the Ku Klux Klan, but during both of his terms, Blacks lost their political strength in the South. By October, Grant suspended habeas corpus in part of South Carolina and he also sent federal troops to help marshals, who initiated prosecutions of Klan members. Akerman was zealous in his attempt to destroy the Klan. Akerman and South Carolina's U.S. marshal arrested over 470 Klan members, but hundreds of Klansmen, including the Klan's wealthy leaders, fled the state. Akerman returned over 3,000 indictments of the Klan throughout the South and obtained 600 convictions for the worst offenders. By 1872, Grant had crushed the Klan, and African Americans peacefully voted in record numbers in elections in the South. Attorney General George H. Williams, Akerman's replacement, suspended his prosecutions of the Klan in North Carolina and South Carolina in the spring of 1873, but prior to the election of 1874, he changed course and prosecuted the Klan. Civil rights prosecutions continued but with fewer yearly cases and convictions.

=== Amnesty Act of 1872 ===
In addition to fighting for African American civil rights, Grant wanted to reconcile with white southerners, out of a spirit of Appomattox. To placate the South, in May 1872, Grant signed the Amnesty Act which restored political rights to former Confederates, except for a few hundred former Confederate officers. Grant wanted people to vote and practice free speech despite their "views, color or nativity".

=== Civil Rights Act of 1875 ===
The Civil Rights Act of 1875 was one of the last major acts of Congress and Grant to preserve Reconstruction and equality for African Americans. The initial bill was proposed by Senator Sumner. Grant endorsed the measure, despite his previous feud with Sumner, signing it into law on March 1, 1875. The law, ahead of its times, outlawed discrimination for blacks in public accommodations, schools, transportation, and selecting juries. Although weakly enforceable, the law spread fear among whites opposed to interracial justice and was overturned by the Supreme Court in 1883. The later enforceable Civil Rights Act of 1964 borrowed many of the earlier 1875's law's provisions.

=== Countered election fraud ===
To counter vote fraud in the Democratic stronghold of New York City, Grant sent in tens of thousands of armed, uniformed federal marshals and other election officials to regulate the 1870 and subsequent elections. Democrats across the North then mobilized to defend their base and attacked Grant's entire set of policies. On October 21, 1876, Grant deployed troops to protect Black and White Republican voters in Petersburg, Virginia.

=== National support of Reconstruction declines ===
Grant's support from Congress and the nation declined due to scandals within his administration and the political resurgence of the Democrats in the North and South. Anti-Reconstruction whites claimed that wealthy white landowners had lost power, and they blamed governmental scandals in the South on it. Meanwhile, white northern Republicans were becoming more conservative. Republicans and Black Americans lost power in the South. By 1870, most Republicans felt the war goals had been achieved, and they turned their attention to other issues such as economic policies. White Americans were in almost full control again by the start of the 1900s and did not enforce Black voting rights. The United States government eventually pulled all its troops from the Southern states.

== African American officeholders ==
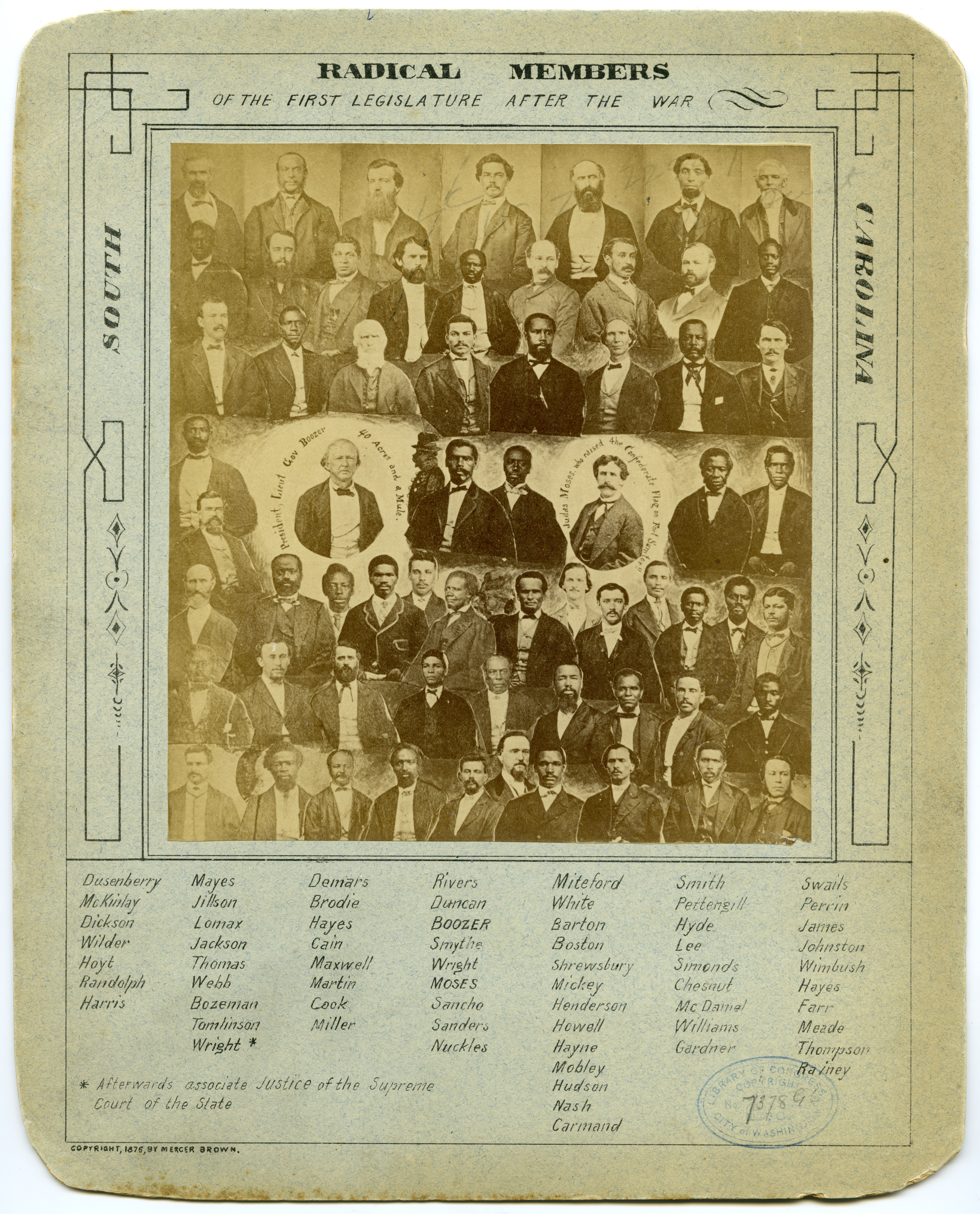
"Radical members of the first legislature after the war, South Carolina"

Republicans took control of all Southern state governorships and state legislatures, except for Virginia. (Note: Georgia had a Republican governor and legislature, but the Republican hegemony was tenuous at best, and Democrats continued to win presidential elections there. See Jackson, Ed; Pou, Charles. "This Day in Georgia History: March 28". Today in Georgia History. Archived from the original on January 9, 2009.; cf. Rufus Bullock.) The Republican coalition elected numerous African Americans to local, state, and national offices; though they did not dominate any electoral offices, Black men as representatives voting in state and federal legislatures marked a drastic social change. At the beginning of 1867, no African American in the South held political office, but within three or four years "about 15 percent of the officeholders in the South were Black—a larger proportion than in 1990". Most of those offices were at the local level. In 1860, Blacks constituted the majority of the population in Mississippi and South Carolina, 47% in Louisiana, 45% in Alabama, and 44% in Georgia and Florida, so their political influence was still far less than their percentage of the population.

About 137 Black officeholders had lived outside the South before the Civil War. Some who had escaped from slavery to the North and had become educated returned to help the South advance in the postwar era. Others were free people of color before the war, who had achieved education and positions of leadership elsewhere. Other African American men elected to office were already leaders in their communities, including a number of preachers. As happened in White communities, not all leadership depended upon wealth and literacy.

Race of delegates to 1867 state constitutional conventions
State	White	Black	% White	Statewide White population (% in 1870)
Virginia	80	25	76	58
North Carolina	107	13	89	63
South Carolina	48	76	39	41
Georgia	133	33	80	54
Florida	28	18	61	51
Alabama	92	16	85	52
Mississippi	68	17	80	46
Louisiana	25	44	36	50
Texas	81	9	90	69

There were few African Americans elected or appointed to national office. African Americans voted for both White and Black candidates. The Fifteenth Amendment guarantees only that voting could not be restricted on the basis of race, color, or previous condition of servitude. From 1868 on, campaigns and elections were surrounded by violence as White insurgents and paramilitaries tried to suppress the Black vote, and fraud was rampant. Many white southerners who had been pro-slavery were angry with governments that had African Americans in office. Furious white Southerners told a rumor that Reconstruction was secretly promoting Black Americans having full control over whites. Many congressional elections in the South were contested. Even states with majority-African-American populations often elected only one or two African American representatives to Congress. Exceptions included South Carolina; at the end of Reconstruction, four of its five congressmen were African Americans.

African Americans in Office 1870–1876
State	State Legislators	U.S. Senators	U.S. Congressmen
Alabama	69	0	4
Arkansas	8	0	0
Florida	30	0	1
Georgia	41	0	1
Louisiana	87	0	1*
Mississippi	112	2	1
North Carolina	30	0	1
South Carolina	190	0	6
Tennessee	1	0	0
Texas	19	0	0
Virginia	46	0	0
Total	633	2	15

== Social and economic factors ==
=== Religion ===
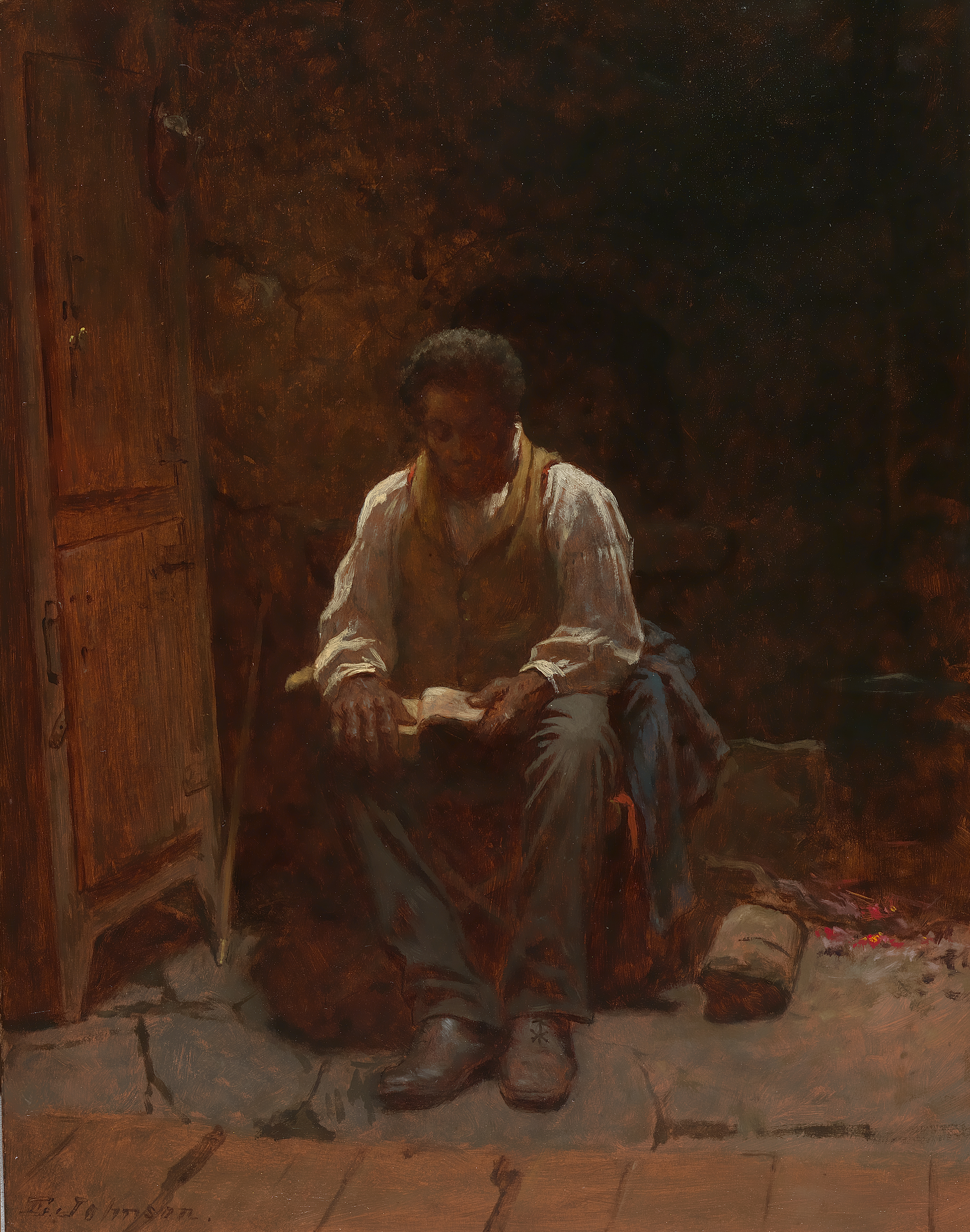
Eastman Johnson's 1863 painting The Lord is My Shepherd, of a man reading the Bible

Freedmen were very active in forming their own churches, mostly Baptist or Methodist, and giving their ministers both moral and political leadership roles. In a process of self-segregation, practically all Blacks left White churches so that few racially integrated congregations remained (apart from some Catholic churches in Louisiana). They started many Black Baptist churches as well as Black state associations.

Four main groups competed with each other across the South to form Methodist churches composed of freedmen. They were the African Methodist Episcopal Church; the African Methodist Episcopal Zion Church (both independent Black denominations founded in Philadelphia and New York, respectively); the Colored Methodist Episcopal Church (which was sponsored by the White Methodist Episcopal Church, South); and the well-funded Methodist Episcopal Church (predominantly White Methodists of the North). The Methodist Church had split before the war due to disagreements about slavery. By 1871, the Northern Methodists had 88,000 Black members in the South, and had opened numerous schools for them.

Blacks in the South made up a core element of the Republican Party. Their ministers had powerful political roles that were distinctive since they did not depend on White support, in contrast to teachers, politicians, businessmen, and tenant farmers. Acting on the principle as stated by Charles H. Pearce, a minister in Florida: "A man in this state cannot do his whole duty as a minister except he looks out for the political interests of his people." More than 100 Black ministers were elected to state legislatures during Reconstruction, as well as several to Congress and one, Hiram Rhodes Revels, to the U.S. Senate.

In a highly controversial action during the war, the Northern Methodists used the Army to seize control of Methodist churches in large cities, over the vehement protests of the Southern Methodists. Historian Ralph Morrow reports:

A War Department order of November 1863, applicable to the Southwestern states of the Confederacy, authorized the Northern Methodists to occupy "all houses of worship belonging to the Methodist Episcopal Church South in which a loyal minister, appointed by a loyal bishop of said church, does not officiate."

Across the North, several denominations—especially the Methodists, Congregationalists, and Presbyterians, as well as the Quakers—strongly supported Radical policies. The focus on social problems paved the way for the Social Gospel movement. Matthew Simpson, a Methodist bishop, played a leading role in mobilizing the Northern Methodists for the cause. Biographer Robert D. Clark calls him the "High Priest of the Radical Republicans". The Methodist Ministers Association of Boston, meeting two weeks after Lincoln's assassination, called for a hard line against the Confederate leadership:

Resolved, that no terms should be made with traitors, no compromise with rebels .... That we hold the national authority bound by the most solemn obligation to God and man to bring all the civil and military leaders of the rebellion to trial by due course of law, and when they are clearly convicted, to execute them.

The denominations all sent missionaries, teachers and activists to the South to help the freedmen. Only the Methodists made many converts, however. Activists sponsored by the Northern Methodist Church played a major role in the Freedmen's Bureau, notably in such key educational roles as the bureau's state superintendent or assistant superintendent of education for Virginia, Florida, Alabama, and South Carolina.

Many Americans interpreted great events in religious terms. Historian Wilson Fallin Jr. contrasts the interpretation of the Civil War and Reconstruction in White versus Black Baptist sermons in Alabama. White Baptists expressed the view that:

God had chastised them and given them a special mission—to maintain orthodoxy, strict biblicism, personal piety, and traditional race relations. Slavery, they insisted, had not been sinful. Rather, emancipation was a historical tragedy and the end of Reconstruction was a clear sign of God's favor.

In sharp contrast, Black Baptists interpreted the Civil War, emancipation, and Reconstruction as:

God's gift of freedom. They appreciated opportunities to exercise their independence, to worship in their own way, to affirm their worth and dignity, and to proclaim the fatherhood of God and the brotherhood of man. Most of all, they could form their own churches, associations, and conventions. These institutions offered self-help and racial uplift, and provided places where the gospel of liberation could be proclaimed. As a result, black preachers continued to insist that God would protect and help them; God would be their rock in a stormy land.

=== Public schools ===
Historian James D. Anderson argues that the freed slaves were the first Southerners "to campaign for universal, state-supported public education". Blacks in the Republican coalition played a critical role in establishing the principle in state constitutions for the first time during congressional Reconstruction. Some slaves had learned to read from White playmates or colleagues before formal education was allowed by law; African Americans started "native schools" before the end of the war; Sabbath schools were another widespread means that freedmen developed to teach literacy. When they gained suffrage, Black politicians took this commitment to public education to state constitutional conventions.

The Republicans created a system of public schools, which were segregated by race everywhere except New Orleans. Generally, elementary and a few secondary schools were built in most cities, and occasionally in the countryside, but the South had few cities. The rural areas faced many difficulties opening and maintaining public schools. In the country, the public school was often a one-room affair that attracted about half the younger children. The teachers were poorly paid, and their pay was often in arrears. Conservatives contended the rural schools were too expensive and unnecessary for a region where the vast majority of people were cotton or tobacco farmers. They had no expectation of better education for their residents. One historian found that the schools were less effective than they might have been because "poverty, the inability of the states to collect taxes, and inefficiency and corruption in many places prevented successful operation of the schools". After Reconstruction ended and White elected officials disenfranchised Blacks and imposed Jim Crow laws, they consistently underfunded Black institutions, including the schools.

After the war, Northern missionaries founded numerous private academies and colleges for freedmen across the South. In addition, every state founded state colleges for freedmen, such as Alcorn State University in Mississippi. The normal schools and state colleges produced generations of teachers who were integral to the education of African American children under the segregated system. By the end of the century, the majority of African Americans were literate.

In the late 19th century, the federal government established land grant legislation to provide funding for higher education across the United States. Learning that Blacks were excluded from land grant colleges in the South, in 1890 the federal government insisted that Southern states establish Black state institutions as land grant colleges to provide for Black higher education, in order to continue to receive funds for their already established White schools. Some states classified their Black state colleges as land grant institutions. Former Congressman John Roy Lynch wrote: "there are very many liberal, fair-minded and influential Democrats in the state [Mississippi] who are strongly in favor of having the state provide for the liberal education of both races".

According to a 2020 study by economist Trevon Logan, increases in Black politicians led to greater tax revenue, which was put towards public education spending (and land tenancy reforms). Logan finds that this led to greater literacy among Black men. A 2025 study found that access to educational opportunities for recently freed people during Reconstruction led to improved occupational standing for the affected individuals.

=== Railroad subsidies and payoffs ===
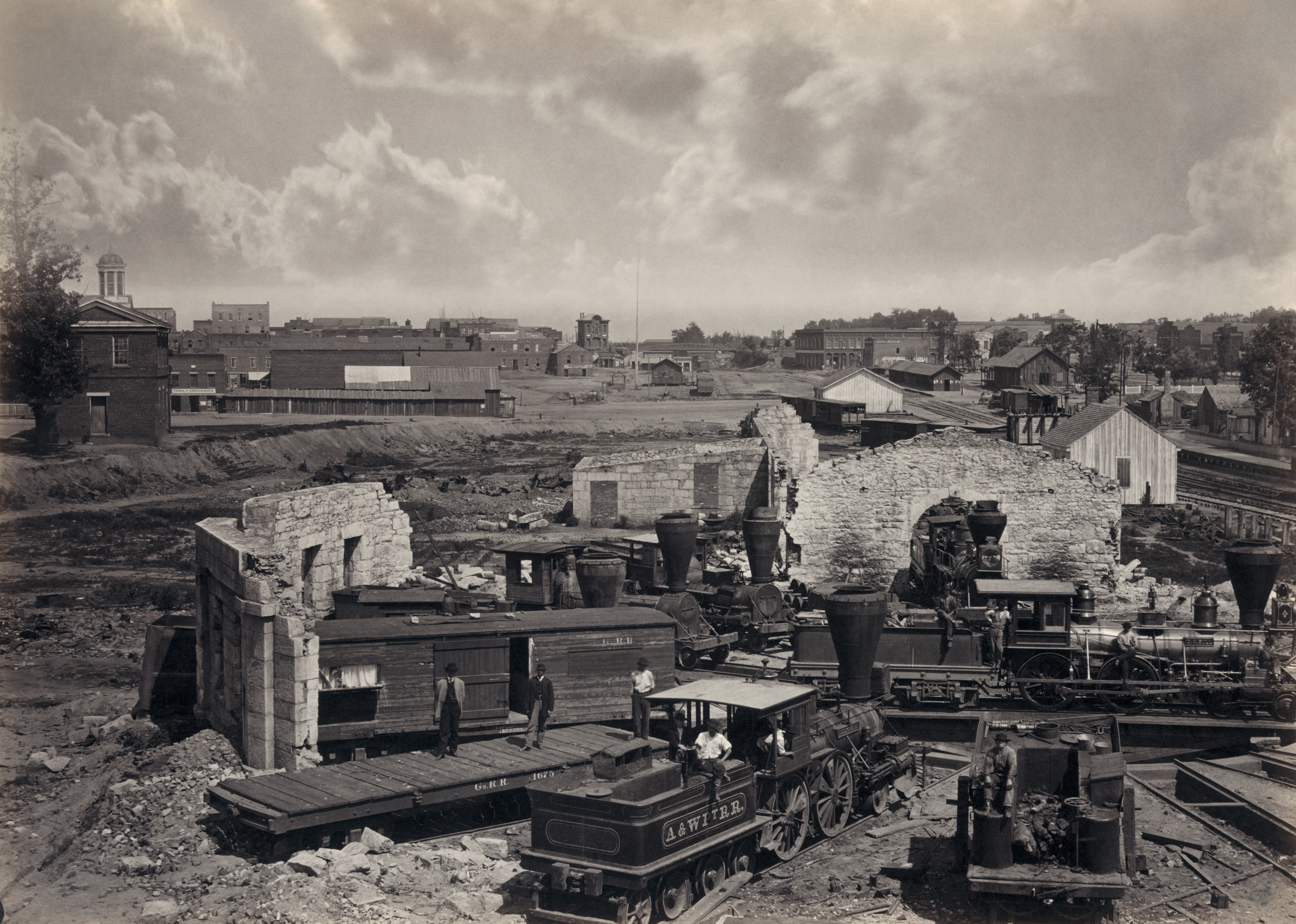
Atlanta's rail yard and roundhouse in ruins shortly after the end of the Civil War

Every Southern state subsidized railroads, which modernizers believed could haul the South out of isolation and poverty. Millions of dollars in bonds and subsidies were fraudulently pocketed. One ring in North Carolina spent $200,000 in bribing the legislature and obtained millions of state dollars for its railroads. Instead of building new track, however, it used the funds to speculate in bonds, reward friends with extravagant fees, and enjoy lavish trips to Europe. Taxes were quadrupled across the South to pay off the railroad bonds and the school costs.

There were complaints among taxpayers because taxes had historically been low, as the planter elite was not committed to public infrastructure or public education. Taxes historically had been much lower in the South than in the North, reflecting the lack of government investment by the communities. Nevertheless, thousands of miles of lines were built as the Southern system expanded from 11,000 miles (18,000 km) in 1870 to 29,000 miles (47,000 km) in 1890. The lines were owned and directed overwhelmingly by Northerners. Railroads helped create a mechanically skilled group of craftsmen and broke the isolation of much of the region. Passengers were few, however, and apart from hauling the cotton crop when it was harvested, there was little freight traffic. As Franklin explains: "numerous railroads fed at the public trough by bribing legislators ... and through the use and misuse of state funds". According to one businessman, the effect "was to drive capital from the state, paralyze industry, and demoralize labor".

=== Southern country store ===
Outside the South, there were plenty of small towns where merchants and storekeepers could prosper. In the antebellum South there was no counterpart. The Civil War had devastated the operation of plantations as cotton prices fell and emancipation disrupted slavers' access to highly exploitable labor. Before the Civil War, plantation owners handled the cotton or tobacco matters and met consumer needs of their family and slaves. They dealt directly with wholesalers (called "factors") in far-off cities. In poor white areas there were occasional merchants before 1865. When slavery was abolished the rural South urgently needed merchants. Ambitious men suddenly appeared after 1865 and played a leading role in refashioning the economic and social fabric of the South. These merchants served as crucial intermediaries between rural communities and larger markets. Many if not most were Jewish peddlers and merchants; some had been in the South for decades and others were newly arrived from the North. They had a good rapport with their Black customers.

Merchants used the newly built railroads to link the rural cotton or tobacco economy to the national economy. They worked with wholesalers in the handful of Southern cities to bring in northern consumer products. Legally they depended on new state laws creating the "crop-lien system". The merchant legally owned the entire commercial crop (usually cotton) from planting to harvest. He sold supplies on credit. When the crop was harvested the farmer brought it all to the merchant who then sold it, paid what the farmer owed the owner of the land, cleared the farmer's debt to the store, and returned the surplus if any. By providing credit to the poor white and black farmers, they exerted more influence every week than the white land owners.

The role of the country store extended beyond simple trade. It was a general store that provided a wide range of goods—pills, petticoats and plows and a hundred other items. The local federal post office was inside, and there were benches outside for the bystanders. The farmers produced most of their own food, but they did buy necessities. In one Florida store with a largely Black clientele, the items most often purchased were corn, salt pork, sugar, lard, coffee, syrup, rice, flour, cloth, shoes, shotguns, shells, and patent medicines. Everything had a price except the one item in greatest demand: gossip was free.

Merchants took food and meat in trade and resold it. These merchants were not just shopkeepers but also acted as bankers and brokers, extending credit to poor farmers and hard-pressed landowners. The customers needed supplies every week, but had an income only at the end of the harvest season. The merchants gave them credit in terms of the expected size of their cotton or tobacco crops. Sharecroppers had to give half or more of the crop to the landowner. The rest at harvest time went to the merchant who would sell advantageously and close the credit accounts. Merchants were thus the liaison between rural areas and the few cities in the postwar South. They handled the flow of goods, information, and credit. Merchants depended on credit from urban wholesalers, and like the sharecroppers they paid off their own debts with proceeds from the cotton or tobacco harvests.

In the paternalistic mill villages that opened in the South in the late 19th century, the textile mills provided jobs for all family members, rented them cheap housing, and paid them in scrip they used to buy food and supplies in company stores. Independent merchants were few.

=== Taxation ===
Reconstruction changed the means of taxation in the South. In the U.S. from the earliest days until today, a major source of state revenue was the property tax. In the South, wealthy landowners were allowed to self-assess the value of their own land. These fraudulent assessments were almost valueless, and pre-war property tax collections were lacking. State revenues came from fees and from sales taxes on slave auctions. Some states assessed property owners by a combination of land value and a capitation tax, a tax on each worker employed. This tax was often assessed in a way to discourage a free labor market, where a slave was assessed at 75 cents, while a free White was assessed at a dollar or more, and a free African American at $3 or more. Some revenue also came from poll taxes. These taxes were more than poor people could pay, with the designed and inevitable consequence that they did not vote.

During Reconstruction, the state legislature mobilized to provide for public needs more than had previous governments: establishing public schools and investing in infrastructure, as well as charitable institutions such as hospitals and asylums. They set out to increase taxes, which were unusually low. The planters had provided privately for their own needs. There was some fraudulent spending in the postwar years; a collapse in state credit because of huge deficits, forced the states to increase property tax rates. In places, the rate went up to 10 times higher—despite the poverty of the region. The planters had not invested in infrastructure and much had been destroyed during the war. In part, the new tax system was designed to force owners of large plantations with huge tracts of uncultivated land either to sell or to have it confiscated for failure to pay taxes. The taxes would serve as a market-based system for redistributing the land to the landless freedmen and White poor. Mississippi, for instance, was mostly frontier, with 90% of the bottom lands in the interior undeveloped.

The following table shows property tax rates for South Carolina and Mississippi. Many local town and county assessments effectively doubled the tax rates reported in the table. These taxes were still levied upon the landowners' own sworn testimony as to the value of their land, which remained the dubious and exploitable system used by wealthy landholders in the South well into the 20th century.

State Property Tax Rates during Reconstruction
Year	South Carolina	Mississippi
1869	5 mills (0.5%)	1 mill (0.1%) (lowest rate between 1822 and 1898)
1870	9 mills	5 mills
1871	7 mills	4 mills
1872	12 mills	8.5 mills
1873	12 mills	12.5 mills
1874	10.3–8 mills	14 mills (1.4%) "a rate which virtually amounted to confiscation" (highest rate between 1822 and 1898)
1875	11 mills	
1876	7 mills	
Sources	Reynolds, J. S. (1905). Reconstruction in South Carolina, 1865–1877. Columbia, SC: The State Co. p. 329.	Hollander, J. H. (1900). Studies in State Taxation with Particular Reference to the Southern States. Baltimore: Johns Hopkins University Press. p. 192.

Called upon to pay taxes on their property essentially for the first time, angry plantation owners revolted. The conservatives shifted their focus away from race to taxes. Former Congressman John R. Lynch, a Black Republican leader from Mississippi, later wrote:

The argument made by the taxpayers, however, was plausible and it may be conceded that, upon the whole, they were about right; for no doubt it would have been much easier upon the taxpayers to have increased at that time the interest-bearing debt of the state than to have increased the tax rate. The latter course, however, had been adopted and could not then be changed unless of course they wanted to change them.

=== National financial issues ===
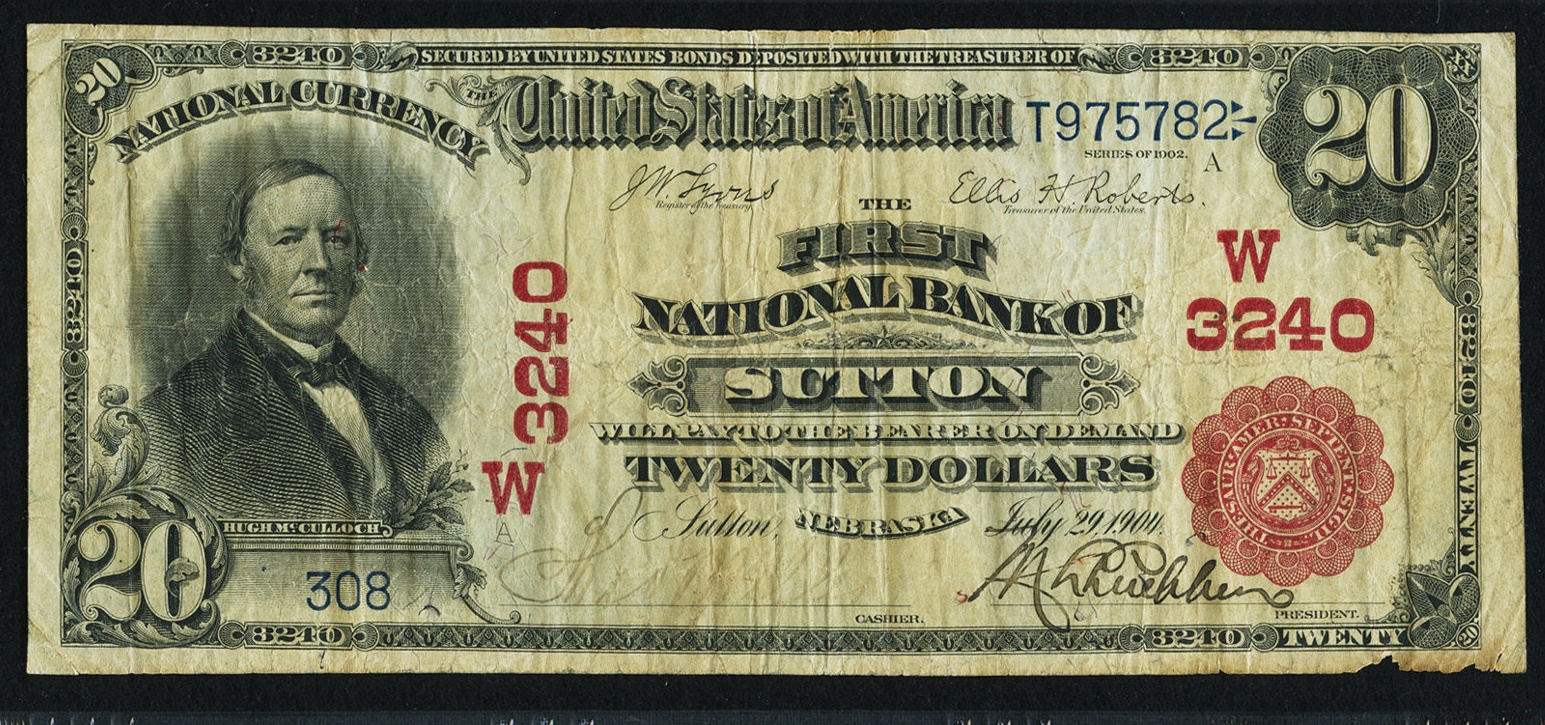
$20 banknote with portrait of Secretary of the Treasury Hugh McCulloch

The Civil War had been financed primarily by issuing short-term and long-term bonds and loans, plus inflation caused by printing paper money, plus new taxes. Wholesale prices had more than doubled, and reduction of inflation was a priority for Secretary McCulloch. A high priority, and by far the most controversial, was the currency question. The old paper currency issued by state banks had been withdrawn, and Confederate currency was worthless. The national banks had issued $207 million in currency, which was backed by gold and silver. The federal treasury had issued $428 million in greenbacks, which was legal tender but not backed by gold or silver. In addition about $275 million of coin was in circulation. The new administration policy announced in October 1865 would be to make all the paper convertible into specie, if Congress so voted. The House of Representatives passed the Alley Resolution on December 18, 1865, by a vote of 144 to 6. In the Senate it was a different matter, for the key player was Senator John Sherman, who said that inflation contraction was not nearly as important as refunding the short-term and long-term national debt. The national debt stood at $2.8 billion. By October 1865, most of it in short-term and temporary loans. Wall Street bankers typified by Jay Cooke believed that the economy was about to grow rapidly, thanks to the development of agriculture through the Homestead Act, the expansion of railroads, especially rebuilding the devastated Southern railroads and opening the transcontinental railroad line to the West Coast, and especially the flourishing of manufacturing during the war. The gold premium over greenbacks was $145 in greenbacks to $100 in gold, and the optimists thought that the heavy demand for currency in an era of prosperity would return the ratio to 100. A compromise was reached in April 1866, that limited the treasury to a currency contraction of only $10 million over six months. Meanwhile, the Senate refunded the entire national debt, but the House failed to act. By early 1867, postwar prosperity was a reality, and the optimists wanted an end to contraction, which Congress ordered in January 1868. Meanwhile, the Treasury issued new bonds at a lower interest rate to refinance the redemption of short-term debt. While the old state bank notes were disappearing from circulation, new national bank notes, backed by species, were expanding. By 1868 inflation was minimal.

=== Culture ===
Baseball rose to prominence during the Civil War, as it gave soldiers from around the country a common pastime. In the aftermath of the war, Northerners who were anxious to reconcile the nation sought to use the unifying powers of the sport mainly among white Americans, resulting in the development of racial segregation in the sport.

== End of Reconstruction ==
Reconstruction is generally considered to have ended in or soon after 1877, when federal troops were withdrawn from the former Confederate states as a result of the contentious 1876 presidential election and specifically its resolving Compromise of 1877. The white-controlled Democratic Party soon took full control in the South, quickly acting to restrict black political power and civil rights.

== Legacy and historiography ==
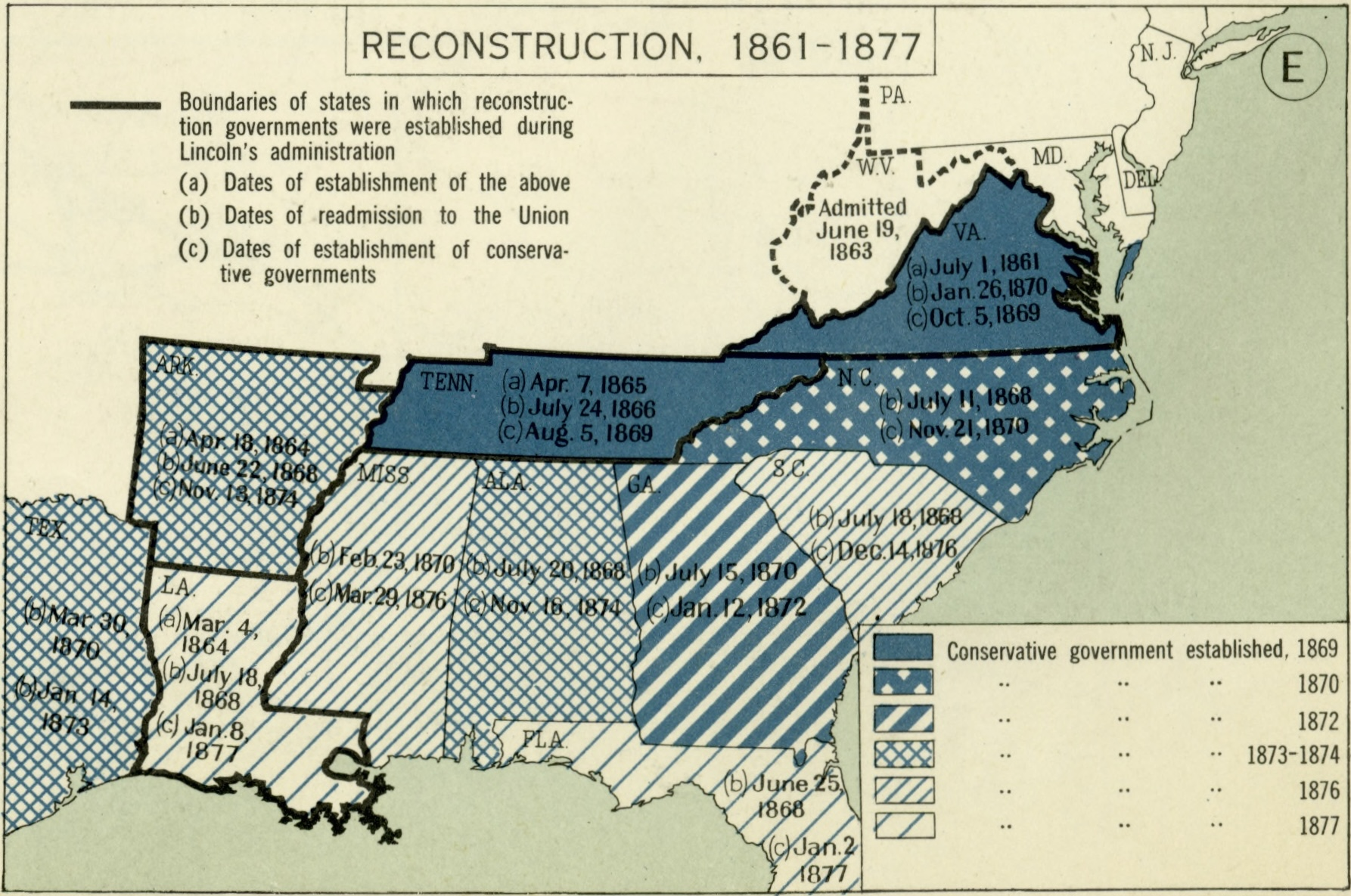
Map of Reconstruction in the United States 1861 to 1877

Besides the election of Southern black people to state governments and the United States Congress, other achievements of the Reconstruction era include "the South's first state-funded public school systems, more equitable taxation legislation, laws against racial discrimination in public transport and accommodations and ambitious economic development programs (including aid to railroads and other enterprises)." Despite these achievements the interpretation of Reconstruction has been a topic of controversy because nearly all historians hold that Reconstruction ended in failure, but for very different reasons.

The first generation of Northern historians believed that the former Confederates were traitors and Johnson was their ally who threatened to undo the Union's constitutional achievements. By the 1880s, however, Northern historians argued that Johnson and his allies were not traitors but had blundered badly in rejecting the Fourteenth Amendment and setting the stage for Radical Reconstruction.

The Black leader Booker T. Washington, who grew up in West Virginia during Reconstruction, concluded later that: "the Reconstruction experiment in racial democracy failed because it began at the wrong end, emphasizing political means and civil rights acts rather than economic means and self-determination". His solution was to concentrate on building the economic infrastructure of the Black community, in part by his leadership and the Southern Tuskegee Institute.

=== Dunning School, 1900s–1920s ===
The Dunning School of scholars, who were trained at the history department of Columbia University under Professor William A. Dunning, analyzed Reconstruction as a failure after 1866 for different reasons. They claimed that Congress took freedoms and rights from qualified Whites and gave them to unqualified Blacks who were being duped by what they called "corrupt carpetbaggers and scalawags". As T. Harry Williams (who was a sharp critic of the Dunning School) notes, the Dunning scholars portray the era in stark terms:

Reconstruction was a battle between two extremes: the Democrats, as the group which included the vast majority of the whites, standing for decent government and racial supremacy, versus the Republicans, the Negroes, alien carpetbaggers, and renegade scalawags, standing for dishonest government and alien ideals. These historians wrote literally in terms of white and black.

=== Revisionists and Beardians, 1930s–1940s ===
In the 1930s, historical revisionism became popular among scholars. As disciples of Charles A. Beard, revisionists focused on economics, downplaying politics and constitutional issues. The central figure was a young scholar at the University of Wisconsin, Howard K. Beale, who in his PhD dissertation, finished in 1924, developed a complex new interpretation of Reconstruction. The Dunning School portrayed freedmen as mere pawns in the hands of northern whites. Beale argued that the whites themselves were pawns in the hands of Northern industrialists, who had taken control of the nation during the Civil War and who Beale felt would be threatened by return to power of the Southern Whites. Beale further argued that the rhetoric of civil rights for Blacks, and the dream of equality, was rhetoric designed to fool idealistic voters, calling it "claptrap", arguing: "Constitutional discussions of the rights of the Negro, the status of Southern states, the legal position of ex-rebels, and the powers of Congress and the president determined nothing. They were pure sham." The Beard–Beale interpretation of Reconstruction became known as "revisionism", and replaced the Dunning School for most historians until the 1950s, after which it was largely discredited.

The Beardian interpretation of the causes of the Civil War downplayed slavery, abolitionism, and issues of morality. It ignored constitutional issues of states' rights and even ignored American nationalism as the force that finally led to victory in the war. Indeed, the ferocious combat itself was passed over as merely an ephemeral event. Much more important was the calculus of class conflict. As the Beards explained in The Rise of American Civilization (1927), the Civil War was really a:

social cataclysm in which the capitalists, laborers, and farmers of the North and West drove from power in the national government the planting aristocracy of the South.

The Beards were especially interested in the Reconstruction era, as the industrialists of the Northeast and the farmers of the West cashed in on their great victory over the Southern aristocracy. Historian Richard Hofstadter paraphrases the Beards as arguing that in victory:

the Northern capitalists were able to impose their economic program, quickly passing a series of measures on tariffs, banking, homesteads, and immigration that guaranteed the success of their plans for economic development. Solicitude for the freedmen had little to do with Northern policies. The Fourteenth Amendment, which gave the Negro his citizenship, Beard found significant primarily as a result of a conspiracy of a few legislative draftsmen friendly to corporations to use the supposed elevation of the blacks as a cover for a fundamental law giving strong protection to business corporations against regulation by state government.

William B. Hesseltine, a socialist politician and historian, adhered to the point that there were Northeastern businessmen wanting to control the Southern economy before and after the war, implying that they did by owning railroads. In his book, A History of The South 1607-1936, he wrtes "when the war closed, Northern business men looked to the South as a colony into which business might expand.... Moderates, Liberals, and Democrats continued to deplore Southern conditions until the Northern business man was persuaded that only a restoration of native white government would bring the peace necessary for economic penetration into the South."

The Beard–Beale interpretation of the monolithic Northern industrialists fell apart in the 1950s when it was closely examined by numerous historians, including Robert P. Sharkey, Irwin Unger, and Stanley Coben. The younger scholars conclusively demonstrated that there was no unified economic policy on the part of the dominant Republican Party. Some wanted high tariffs and some low. Some wanted greenbacks and others wanted gold. There was no conspiracy to use Reconstruction to impose any such unified economic policy on the nation. Northern businessmen were widely divergent on monetary or tariff policy, and seldom paid attention to Reconstruction issues. Furthermore, the rhetoric on behalf of the rights of the freedmen was not claptrap but deeply-held and very serious political philosophy.

=== Black historians ===
The Black scholar W. E. B. Du Bois, in his Black Reconstruction in America, 1860–1880, published in 1935, compares results across the states to show achievements by the Reconstruction legislatures and to refute claims about wholesale African American control of governments. He shows Black contributions, as in the establishment of universal public education, charitable and social institutions and universal suffrage as important results, and he notes their collaboration with Whites. He also points out that Whites benefited most by the financial deals made, and he put excesses in the perspective of the war's aftermath. He notes that despite complaints, several states kept their Reconstruction-era state constitutions into the early 20th century. Despite receiving favorable reviews, his work was largely ignored by White historians of his time.

=== Neo-abolitionists ===
In the 1960s, neo-abolitionist historians emerged, led by John Hope Franklin, Kenneth Stampp, Leon Litwack, and Eric Foner. Influenced by the civil rights movement, they rejected the Dunning School and found a great deal to praise in Radical Reconstruction. Foner, the primary advocate of this view, argues that it was never truly completed and that a "Second Reconstruction" was needed in the late 20th century to complete the goal of full equality for African Americans. The neo-abolitionists followed the revisionists in minimizing the corruption and waste created by Republican state governments, saying it was no worse than Boss Tweed's ring in New York City.

Instead, they emphasize that suppression of the rights of African Americans was a worse scandal, and a grave corruption of America's republicanist ideals. They argue that the tragedy of Reconstruction was not that it failed because Blacks were incapable of governing, especially as they did not dominate any state government, but that it failed because Whites raised an insurgent movement to restore White supremacy. White-elite-dominated state legislatures passed disenfranchising state constitutions from 1890 to 1908 that effectively barred most Blacks and many poor Whites from voting. This disenfranchisement affected millions of people for decades into the 20th century, and closed African Americans and poor Whites out of the political process in the South.

Re-establishment of White supremacy meant that within a decade African Americans were excluded from virtually all local, state, and federal governance in all states of the South. Lack of representation meant that they were treated as second-class citizens, with schools and services consistently underfunded in segregated societies, no representation on juries or in law enforcement, and bias in other legislation. It was not until the civil rights movement and the passage of the Civil Rights Act of 1964 and the Voting Rights Act of 1965 that segregation was outlawed and suffrage restored, under what has in retrospect been referred to as the "Second Reconstruction".

Foner concludes that from the Black point of view "Reconstruction must be judged a failure." Foner states Reconstruction was "a noble if flawed experiment, the first attempt to introduce a genuine inter-racial democracy in the United States". According to him, the many factors contributing to the failure included: lack of a permanent federal agency specifically designed for the enforcement of civil rights; the Morrison R. Waite Supreme Court decisions that dismantled previous congressional civil rights legislation; and the economic reestablishment of Whiggish white planters in the South by 1877. Historian William McFeely explains that although the constitutional amendments and civil rights legislation on their own merit were remarkable achievements, no permanent government agency whose specific purpose was civil rights enforcement had been created. (Note: Although Grant and Attorney General Amos T. Akerman set up a strong legal system to protect African Americans, the Department of Justice did not set up a permanent Civil Rights Division until the Civil Rights Act of 1957.)

More recent work by Nina Silber, David W. Blight, Cecelia O'Leary, Laura F. Edwards, LeeAnn Whites, and Edward J. Blum has encouraged greater attention to race, religion, and issues of gender while at the same time pushing the effective end of Reconstruction to the end of the 19th century, while monographs by Charles Reagan Wilson, Gaines Foster, W. Scott Poole, and Bruce Baker have offered new views of the Southern "Lost Cause".

=== Dating the end of the Reconstruction era ===
At the national level, textbooks typically date the era from 1865 to 1877. Foner's textbook of national history Give Me Liberty is an example. His monograph Reconstruction: America's Unfinished Revolution, 1863–1877 (1988) focusing on the situation in the South, covers 1863 to 1865. While 1877 is the usual date given for the end of Reconstruction, some historians such as Orville Vernon Burton extend the era to the 1890s to include the imposition of segregation. 1877 is also commonly used as a dividing point for two-semester survey courses and two-volume textbooks that aim to cover all of U.S. history.

=== Economic role of race ===
Economists and economic historians have different interpretations of the economic impact of race on the postwar Southern economy. In 1995, Robert Whaples took a random survey of 178 members of the Economic History Association, who studied American history in all time periods. He asked whether they wholly or partly accepted, or rejected, 40 propositions in the scholarly literature about American economic history. The greatest difference between economics PhDs and history PhDs came in questions on competition and race. For example, the proposition originally put forward by Robert Higgs, "in the post-bellum South economic competition among Whites played an important part in protecting blacks from racial coercion", was accepted in whole or part by 66% of the economists, but by only 22% of the historians. Whaples says this highlights: "A recurring difference dividing historians and economists. The economists have more faith in the power of the competitive market. For example, they see the competitive market as protecting disenfranchised blacks and are less likely to accept the idea that there was exploitation by merchant monopolists."

=== Reconstruction failures ===
Reconstruction is widely considered a failure, though the reason for this is a matter of controversy.

- The Dunning School considers failure inevitable because it feels that taking the right to vote or hold office away from Southern Whites was a violation of republicanism.
- A second school sees the reason for failure as Northern Republicans' lack of effectiveness in guaranteeing political rights to Blacks.
- A third school blames the failure on not giving land to the freedmen so they could have their own economic base of power.
- A fourth school sees the major reason for the failure of Reconstruction as the states' inability to suppress the violence of Southern Whites when they sought reversal for Blacks' gains. Etcheson (2009) points to the "violence that crushed black aspirations and the abandonment by Northern whites of Southern Republicans". Etcheson writes that it is hard to see Reconstruction "as concluding in anything but failure", adding: "W. E. B. DuBois captured that failure well when he wrote in Black Reconstruction in America (1935): 'The slave went free; stood a brief moment in the sun; then moved back again toward slavery.'"
- Other historians emphasize the failure to fully incorporate Southern Unionists into the Republican coalition. Derek W. Frisby points to "Reconstruction's failure to appreciate the challenges of Southern Unionism and incorporate these loyal Southerners into a strategy that would positively affect the character of the peace".

Historian Donald R. Shaffer maintains that the gains during Reconstruction for African Americans were not entirely extinguished. The legalization of African American marriages and families and the independence of Black churches from White denominations were a source of strength during the Jim Crow era. Reconstruction was not forgotten within the Black community, and it remained a source of inspiration. The system of sharecropping granted Blacks a considerable amount of freedom as compared to slavery.

Foner argues:

What remains certain is that Reconstruction failed, and that for Blacks its failure was a disaster whose magnitude cannot be obscured by the genuine accomplishments that did endure.

Annette Gordon-Reed describes the effects if Reconstruction had not failed. Mark Summers argues that the "failure" question should be looked at from the viewpoint of the war goals:

If we see Reconstruction's purpose as making sure that the main goals of the war would be fulfilled, of a Union held together forever, of a North and South able to work together, of slavery extirpated, and sectional rivalries confined, of the permanent banishment of the fear of vaunting appeals to state sovereignty, backed by armed force, then Reconstruction looks like what in that respect it was, a lasting and unappreciated success.

=== In popular culture ===
Journalist Joel Chandler Harris, who wrote under the name "Joe Harris" for the Atlanta Constitution (mostly after Reconstruction), tried to advance racial and sectional reconciliation in the late 19th century. He supported Henry W. Grady's vision of a New South during Grady's time as editor from 1880 to 1889. Harris wrote many editorials in which he encouraged Southerners to accept the changed conditions along with some Northern influences, but he asserted his belief that change should proceed under White supremacy.

In popular literature, two early 20th-century novels by Thomas Dixon Jr. – The Leopard's Spots: A Romance of the White Man's Burden – 1865–1900 (1902), and The Clansman: A Historical Romance of the Ku Klux Klan (1905) – idealize White resistance to Northern and Black coercion, hailing vigilante action by the Ku Klux Klan. D. W. Griffith adapted The Clansman for the screen in his anti-Republican movie The Birth of a Nation (1915); it stimulated the formation of the 20th-century version of the KKK. Many other authors romanticized the supposed benevolence of slavery and the elite world of the antebellum plantations, in memoirs and histories which were published in the late 19th and early 20th centuries; the United Daughters of the Confederacy promoted influential works which were written in these genres by women.

Of much more lasting impact was the story Gone with the Wind, first in the form of the best-selling 1936 novel, which enabled its author Margaret Mitchell to win the Pulitzer Prize, and an award-winning Hollywood blockbuster with the same title in 1939. In each case, the second half of the story focuses on Reconstruction in Atlanta. The book sold millions of copies nationwide; the film is regularly re-broadcast on television. In 2018, it remained at the top of the list of highest-grossing films, adjusted in order to keep up with inflation. The New Georgia Encyclopedia argues:

Politically, the film offers a conservative view of Georgia and the South. In her novel, despite her Southern prejudices, Mitchell showed clear awareness of the shortcomings of her characters and their region. The film is less analytical. It portrays the story from a clearly Old South point of view: the South is presented as a great civilization, the practice of slavery is never questioned, and the plight of the freedmen after the Civil War is implicitly blamed on their emancipation. A series of scenes whose racism rivals that of D. W. Griffith's film The Birth of a Nation (1915) mainly portrays Reconstruction as a time when Southern whites were victimized by freed slaves, who themselves were exploited by Northern carpetbaggers.

=== In education ===
The "Dunning School" dominated white scholarship about Reconstruction during most of the 20th century. Black scholarship on the Reconstruction era was mostly ignored until the civil rights movement of the 1950s and 1960s, though the racist interpretations of the Dunning School continue to this day.

Foner states "for no other period of American history does so wide a gap exist between current scholarship and popular historical understanding, which, judging from references to Reconstruction in recent newspaper articles, films, popular books, and in public monuments across the country, still bears the mark of the old Dunning School."

As reported in a January 2022 Time magazine article:

In social studies standards for 45 out of 50 states and the District of Columbia, discussion of Reconstruction is "partial" or "non-existent", according to historians who reviewed how the period is discussed in K-12 social studies standards for public schools nationwide. In a report produced by the education nonprofit Zinn Education Project, the study's authors say they are concerned that American children will grow up to be uninformed about a critical period of history that helps explain why full racial equality remains unfulfilled today.

The Zinn Education Project's report, Erasing the Black Freedom Struggle: How State Standards Fail to Teach the Truth About Reconstruction, highlights the historical connections to Reconstruction that surround us today and examines Reconstruction's place in state social studies standards across the United States and the barriers to teaching effective Reconstruction history. According to a Facing South article entitled "The South's schools are failing to teach accurate Reconstruction history":

"It is our hope that states and districts will adopt these guidelines for their own educational standards, curricula, and professional development," the report states. "In so doing, they will be better equipped to teach students the true history of Reconstruction, help students understand its significance and make connections to the present day. And they will empower teachers to educate their students and themselves about ongoing Reconstruction scholarship."

== See also ==
- African American founding fathers of the United States
- Reconstruction Era National Monument
- Remembering Reconstruction: Struggles over the Meaning of America's Most Turbulent Era
- Freedmen's town

== Bibliography ==
=== Scholarly secondary sources ===
- Anderson, James D. (1988). The Education of Blacks in the South, 1860–1935. University of North Carolina Press.
- Barney, William L. (1987). Passage of the Republic: An Interdisciplinary History of Nineteenth Century America. D. C. Heath. ISBN 0-669-04758-9.
- Blair, William (2005). "The use of military force to protect the gains of reconstruction". Civil War History. 51 (4): 388–402. doi:10.1353/cwh.2005.0055. S2CID 144025738.
- Blum, Edward J. (2005). Reforging the White Republic: Race, Religion, and American Nationalism, 1865–1898.
- Bradley, Mark L. (2009). Bluecoats and Tar Heels: Soldiers and Civilians in Reconstruction North Carolina. University Press of Kentucky. ISBN 978-0-8131-2507-7.
- Brands, H. W. (2012). The Man Who Saved the Union: Ulysses S. Grant in War and Peace. New York: Doubleday. ISBN 978-0-385-53241-9.
- Brown, Thomas J., ed. (2008). Reconstructions: New Perspectives on the Postbellum United States.
- Calhoun, Charles W. (2017). The Presidency of Ulysses S. Grant. Lawrence: University Press of Kansas. ISBN 978-0-7006-2484-3. scholarly review and response by Calhoun at doi:10.14296/RiH/2014/2270
- Chernow, Ron (2017). Grant. New York: Penguin Press. ISBN 978-1-59420-487-6.
- Cimbala, Paul, and Randall Miller, eds. The Freedmen's Bureau and Reconstruction (Fordham UP, 2020). The Freedmen's Bureau and Reconstruction
- Cimbala, Paul Alan; Miller, Randall M.; Simpson, Brooks D. (2002). An Uncommon Time: The Civil War and the Northern Home Front. Fordham University Press. ISBN 978-0-8232-2195-0.
- Donald, David Herbert; Baker, Jean H.; Holt, Michael F. (2001). The Civil War and Reconstruction. New York: Norton. ISBN 978-0393974270. OCLC 247969097.
- Downs, Gregory P. (2015). After Appomattox: Military Occupation and the Ends of War. Cambridge, MA: Harvard University Press.
- Downs, Jim (2012). Sick from Freedom: African-American Illness and Suffering during the Civil War and Reconstruction. New York: Oxford University Press. ISBN 9780199758722 – via Google Books.
- Doyle, Don H. (2024). The Age of Reconstruction: How Lincoln's New Birth of Freedom Remade the World. Princeton & Oxford: Princeton University Press.
- Egerton, Douglas (2014). The Wars of Reconstruction: The Brief, Violent History of America's Most Progressive Era. Bloomsbury Press. ISBN 978-1-60819-566-4.
- Foner, Eric (1983). Nothing But Freedom: Emancipation and its Legacy (pdf) (1st ed.). Baton Rouge: Louisiana State University Press. pp. 39–40. ISBN 978-0-8071-1118-5. LCCN 83007906. OCLC 422767493.
- Foner, Eric (1990). A Short History of Reconstruction. New York: Harper Perennial. ISBN 9780060964313.
- Foner, Eric; Mahoney, Olivia (June 1997). America's Reconstruction: People and Politics After the Civil War. LSU Press. ISBN 0-8071-2234-3.
- Foner, Eric (1988). Reconstruction: America's Unfinished Revolution, 1863–1877. New York: Harper & Row. ISBN 0-06-015851-4. Pulitzer-prize winning history, and most detailed synthesis of original and previous scholarship.
- Foner, Eric (2005). Forever Free: The Story of Emancipation and Reconstruction.
- Foner, Eric (2014b) [1988]. Reconstruction: America's Unfinished Revolution, 1863–1877 (updated ed.). New York: Harper Perennial. ISBN 978-0-06-235451-8.
- Foner, Eric (2019). The Second Founding: How the Civil War and Reconstruction Remade the Constitution. New York: W. W. Norton & Company. ISBN 978-0-393-35852-0.
- Franklin, John Hope (1961). Reconstruction After the Civil War. University of Chicago Press. ISBN 0-226-26079-8.
- Gates Jr, Henry Louis. Stony the Road: Reconstruction, White Supremacy, and the Rise of Jim Crow (Penguin, 2020) online; see also online book review.
- Guelzo, Allen C. (1999). Abraham Lincoln: Redeemer President. W. B. Eerdmans. ISBN 978-0802838728. 2nd ed. (2022).
- Guelzo, Allen C. (2004). Lincoln's Emancipation Proclamation: The End of Slavery in America. New York: Simon & Schuster. ISBN 978-1-4165-4795-2.
- Guelzo, Allen C. (2018). Reconstruction: A Concise History. Oxford University Press. ISBN 978-0190865696. Archived from the original on April 7, 2023.
- Harris, William C. (1997). With Charity for All: Lincoln and the Restoration of the Union. Portrays Lincoln as opponent of Radicals.
- Holzer, Harold; Medford, Edna Greene; Williams, Frank J. (2006). The Emancipation Proclamation: Three Views (Social, Political, Iconographic). Louisiana State University Press. ISBN 978-0-8071-3144-2.
- Hubbs, G. Ward (2015). Searching for Freedom after the Civil War: Klansman, Carpetbagger, Scalawg, and Freedman. Tuscaloosa: University of Alabama Press.
- Hunter, Tera W. (1997). To 'Joy My Freedom: Southern Black Women's Lives and Labors after the Civil War. Cambridge, MA: Harvard University Press.
- Jenkins, Wilbert L. (2002). Climbing up to Glory: A Short History of African Americans During the Civil War and Reconstruction.
- Jones, Jacqueline (2010). Labor of Love, Labor of Sorrow: Black Women, Work, and the Family, from Slavery to the Present. New York: Basic Books.
- Kaczorowski, Robert J. (1995). "Federal Enforcement of Civil Rights During the First Reconstruction". Fordham Urban Law Journal. 23 (1): 155–186. ISSN 2163-5978. Archived from the original on March 4, 2016.
- Kahan, Paul (2018). The Presidency of Ulysses S. Grant: Preserving the Civil War's Legacy. Westholme Publishing. ISBN 978-1-59416-273-2.
- Kutler, Stanley I. Judicial power and Reconstruction politics (University of Chicago Press, 2022). online
- Lemann, Nicholas (2007). Redemption: The Last Battle of the Civil War. New York: Farrar, Straus & Giroux. pp. 15–21. ISBN 9780374530693.
- Logan, Trevon D. (2020). "Do Black Politicians Matter? Evidence from Reconstruction". Journal of Economic History. 80 (1): 1–37. doi:10.1017/S0022050719000755. S2CID 219136609.
- Lynd, Staughton, ed. (1967). Reconstruction. New York, Evanston, and London: Harper & Row.
- McFeely, William S. (1974). Woodward, C. Vann (ed.). Responses of the Presidents to Charges of Misconduct. New York: Delacorte Press. ISBN 978-0-440-05923-3.
- McFeely, William S. (2002) [1981]. Grant: A Biography. New York City: W. W. Norton & Company. ISBN 978-0-393-01372-6. OCLC 6889578.
- McPherson, James M. (1992). Abraham Lincoln and the Second American Revolution. Oxford University Press. ISBN 978-0-19-507606-6.
- McPherson, James M.; Hogue, James (2009). Ordeal By Fire: The Civil War and Reconstruction.
- Milton, George Fort (1930). The Age of Hate: Andrew Johnson and the Radicals; from Dunning School.
- Morrow, Ralph E. (1954). "Northern Methodism in the South during Reconstruction". Mississippi Valley Historical Review. 41 (2): 197–218. doi:10.2307/1895802. JSTOR 1895802.
- Oberholtzer, Ellis Paxson (1917). A History of the United States Since the Civil War: 1865–68. Vol. 1.
- Osborne, John M.; Bombaro, Christine (2015). Forgotten Abolitionist: John A. J. Creswell of Maryland. Carlisle, Pennsylvania: Dickinson College. ISBN 9780996932103.
- Patrick, Rembert (1967). The Reconstruction of the Nation. New York: Oxford University Press.
- Patton, James Welch (1934). Unionism and Reconstruction in Tennessee, 1860–1869. University of North Carolina Press.
- Perman, Michael (1985). The Road to Redemption: Southern Politics, 1869–1879. Chapel Hill: University of North Carolina Press. ISBN 978-0807841419.
- Perman, Michael (2003). Emancipation and Reconstruction.
- Peterson, Merrill D. (1994). Lincoln in American Memory. New York: Oxford University Press. ISBN 978-0-19-802304-3.
- Randall, J. G.; Donald, David (2016). The Civil War and Reconstruction [Second Edition]. Pickle Partners Publishing. ISBN 978-1787200272.
- Richter, William L. (2009). A to Z of the Civil War and Reconstruction. Scarecrow Press. ISBN 978-0-8108-6336-1.
- Rhodes, James F. (1920). History of the United States from the Compromise of 1850 to the McKinley–Bryan Campaign of 1896. Highly detailed narrative by Pulitzer Prize winner; argues was a political disaster because it violated the rights of White Southerners.
  - Volume: 6: 1865–72 (via Google Books)
  - Volume: 7: 1877 (via Google Books)
- Simon, John Y. (2002). "Ulysses S. Grant". In Graff, Henry (ed.). The Presidents: A Reference History (7th ed.). Macmillan Library Reference USA. pp. 245–260. ISBN 0-684-80551-0.
- Simpson, Brooks D. (2009). The Reconstruction Presidents (2nd ed.). Lawrence, Kansas: University Press of Kansas.
- Sinha, Manisha (2024). The Rise and Fall of the Second American Republic: Reconstruction, 1860–1920. Liveright Publishing. ISBN 978-1-63149-844-2.
- Smith, Jean Edward (2001). Grant. New York: Simon & Schuster. ISBN 0-684-84927-5.
- Stampp, Kenneth M. (1965). The Era of Reconstruction, 1865–1877. New York: Vintage Books; short survey; rejects Dunning School analysis.
- Stauffer, John (2008). Giants: The Parallel Lives of Frederick Douglass & Abraham Lincoln. New York: Twelve.
- Stewart, Megan A., and Karin E. Kitchens. "Social transformation and violence: Evidence from US Reconstruction." Comparative Political Studies 54.11 (2021): 1939–1983. online
- Stover, John F. (1955). The Railroads of the South, 1865–1900: A Study in Finance and Control. University of North Carolina Press.
- Stowell, Daniel W. (1998). Rebuilding Zion: The Religious Reconstruction of the South, 1863–1877. Oxford University Press. ISBN 978-0-19-802621-1.
- Summers, Mark Wahlgren (2009). A Dangerous Stir: Fear, Paranoia, and the Making of Reconstruction. excerpt and text search Archived March 7, 2017, at the Wayback Machine
- Summers, Mark Wahlgren (2014). The Ordeal of the Reunion: A New History of Reconstruction. University of North Carolina Press. ISBN 978-1-4696-1757-2. text search Archived March 20, 2021, at the Wayback Machine
- Summers, Mark Wahlgren (2014a). Railroads, Reconstruction, and the Gospel of Prosperity: Aid Under the Radical Republicans, 1865–1877. Princeton University Press. ISBN 978-0-691-61282-9.
- Sweet, William W. (1914). "The Methodist Episcopal Church and Reconstruction". Journal of the Illinois State Historical Society. 7 (3): 147–165. JSTOR 40194198.
- Trefousse, Hans L. (1989). Andrew Johnson: A Biography. New York: W. W. Norton & Company.
- Wagner, Margaret E.; Gallagher, Gary W.; Finkelman, Paul (2002). The Library of Congress Civil War Desk Reference. New York: Simon & Schuster. ISBN 978-1-4391-4884-6.
- Wang, Xi (1997). The Trial of Democracy: Black Suffrage and Northern Republicans, 1860–1910. Athens: University of Georgia Press. ISBN 978-0-8203-4206-1.
- White, Richard (2017). The Republic for Which It Stands. Oxford University Press.
- White, Ronald C. (2016). American Ulysses: A Life of Ulysses S. Grant. Random House Publishing. ISBN 978-1-58836-992-5.
- Williams, T. Harry (November 1946). "An Analysis of Some Reconstruction Attitudes". Journal of Southern History. 12 (4): 469–486. doi:10.2307/2197687. JSTOR 2197687.
- Woodward, C. Vann (1966). Reunion and Reaction: The Compromise of 1877 and the End of Reconstruction. Oxford University Press. ISBN 978-0-19-506423-0.
- Zuczek, Richard, ed. (2006). Encyclopedia of the Reconstruction Era. (2 vols.)

=== Historiography ===
- Foner, Eric (2014a). "Introduction to the 2014 Anniversary Edition". Reconstruction: America's Unfinished Revolution, 1863–18 (Updated ed.). Harper Collins. ISBN 978-0062383235.
- Ford, Lacy K., ed. A Companion to the Civil War and Reconstruction. Blackwell (2005) 518 pp.
- Frantz, Edward O., ed. A Companion to the Reconstruction Presidents 1865–1881 (2014). 30 essays by scholars.
- Guelzo, Allen C. “The History of Reconstruction’s Third Phase.” History News Network (February 4, 2018) online.
- Parfait, Claire (2009). "Reconstruction Reconsidered: A Historiography of Reconstruction, from the Late Nineteenth Century to the 1960s". Études anglaises. 62 (4): 440–454. doi:10.3917/etan.624.0440. Archived from the original on January 18, 2022 – via Cairn Info.
- Perman, Michael and Amy Murrell Taylor, eds. Major Problems in the Civil War and Reconstruction: Documents and Essays (2010)
- Richardson, Heather Cox (2017). "Reconstructing the Gilded Age and Progressive Era". In Nichols, Christopher McKnight; Unger, Nancy (eds.). A Companion to the Gilded Age and Progressive Era. Wiley Blackwell Companions to American History. John Wiley & Sons. pp. 5–20. doi:10.1002/9781118913994.ch1. ISBN 9781118913963.
- Simpson, Brooks D. (2016). "Mission Impossible: Reconstruction Policy Reconsidered". The Journal of the Civil War Era. 6: 85–102. doi:10.1353/cwe.2016.0003. S2CID 155789816.
- Smith, Stacey L. (November 3, 2016). "Beyond North and South: Putting the West in the Civil War and Reconstruction". The Journal of the Civil War Era. 6 (4): 566–591. doi:10.1353/cwe.2016.0073. S2CID 164313047.
- Stalcup, Brenda, ed. (1995). Reconstruction: Opposing Viewpoints. Greenhaven Press. Uses primary documents to present opposing viewpoints.
- Stampp, Kenneth M.; Litwack, Leon F., eds. (1969). Reconstruction: An Anthology of Revisionist Writings. Essays by scholars.

=== Yearbooks ===
- Appleton's American Annual Cyclopedia and Register of Important Events of the Year 1867 (highly detailed compendium of facts and primary sources; details on every U.S. state & the national government)
- Appleton's American Annual Cyclopedia... for 1868 (1873)
- Appleton's American Annual Cyclopedia... for 1869 (1869)
- Appleton's American Annual Cyclopedia... for 1870 (1871)
- Appleton's American Annual Cyclopedia... for 1872 (1873)
- Appleton's American Annual Cyclopedia... for 1873 (1879)
- Appleton's American Annual Cyclopedia... for 1875 (1876)
- Appleton's American Annual Cyclopedia... for 1876 (1877)
- Appleton's American Annual Cyclopedia... for 1877 (1878)
- The American year-book and national register for 1869 (1869) online

=== Primary sources ===
- Berlin, Ira, ed. Freedom: A Documentary History of Emancipation, 1861–1867 (1982), 970 pp. of archival documents; also Free at Last: A Documentary History of Slavery, Freedom, and the Civil War ed by Ira Berlin, Barbara J. Fields, and Steven F. Miller (1993).
- Fleming, Walter L. (1906–1907). Documentary History of Reconstruction: Political, Military, Social, Religious, Educational, and Industrial. 2 vols. Presents a broad collection of primary sources; Vol. 1: On National Politics; Vol. 2: On States (via Google Books).
- Hyman, Harold M., ed. The Radical Republicans and Reconstruction, 1861–1870 (1967), collection of long political speeches and pamphlets.
- Lynch, John R. (1913). The Facts of Reconstruction. New York: The Neale Publishing Company. Archived from the original on January 13, 2020. One of the first Black congressmen during Reconstruction.
- McPherson, Edward (1875). The Political History of the United States of America During the Period of Reconstruction. Solomons & Chapman. large collection of speeches and primary documents, 1865–1870, complete text online. [The copyright has expired.]
- Palmer, Beverly Wilson; Byers Ochoa, Holly; eds. The Selected Papers of Thaddeus Stevens 2 vols. (1998), 900 pp; his speeches plus and letters to and from Stevens.
- Palmer, Beverly Wilson, ed. The Selected Letters of Charles Sumner, 2 vols. (1990); Vol. 2 covers 1859–1874.
- Peters, Gerhard; Woolley, John T. (2018b). "1868 Democratic Party Platform". The American Presidency Project. Archived from the original on August 3, 2015.
- Pike, James Shepherd (1874). The prostrate state: South Carolina under negro government.
- Reid, Whitelaw After the War: A Southern Tour, May 1, 1865 to May 1, 1866 (1866). By Republican editor.
- Smith, John David, ed. We Ask Only for Even-Handed Justice: Black Voices from Reconstruction, 1865–1877 (University of Massachusetts Press, 2014). xviii, 133 pp.
- Sumner, Charles 'Our Domestic Relations: or, How to Treat the Rebel States' Atlantic Monthly September 1863 Archived July 25, 2002, at the Wayback Machine, early abolitionist manifesto.
