= Forty acres and a mule =

Attempt to redistribute land during the US Civil War

- General William Sherman, head-and-shoulders portrait, facing right
- Date: January 16, 1865 – autumn 1865
- Location: Southern United States (primarily coastal South Carolina, Georgia, and Florida)
- Type: Agrarian reform, land redistribution, reparations for slavery policy
- Outcome: Settlement of an estimated 40,000 freed people across roughly 400,000 acres of confiscated Confederate land; Introduction of army-lent mules to assist Black agrarian families with independent cultivation; Complete policy reversal by President Andrew Johnson in the fall of 1865; Eviction of freed families and restoration of lands to former Confederate slaveholders; Widespread rise of the systemic sharecropping economic framework across the South

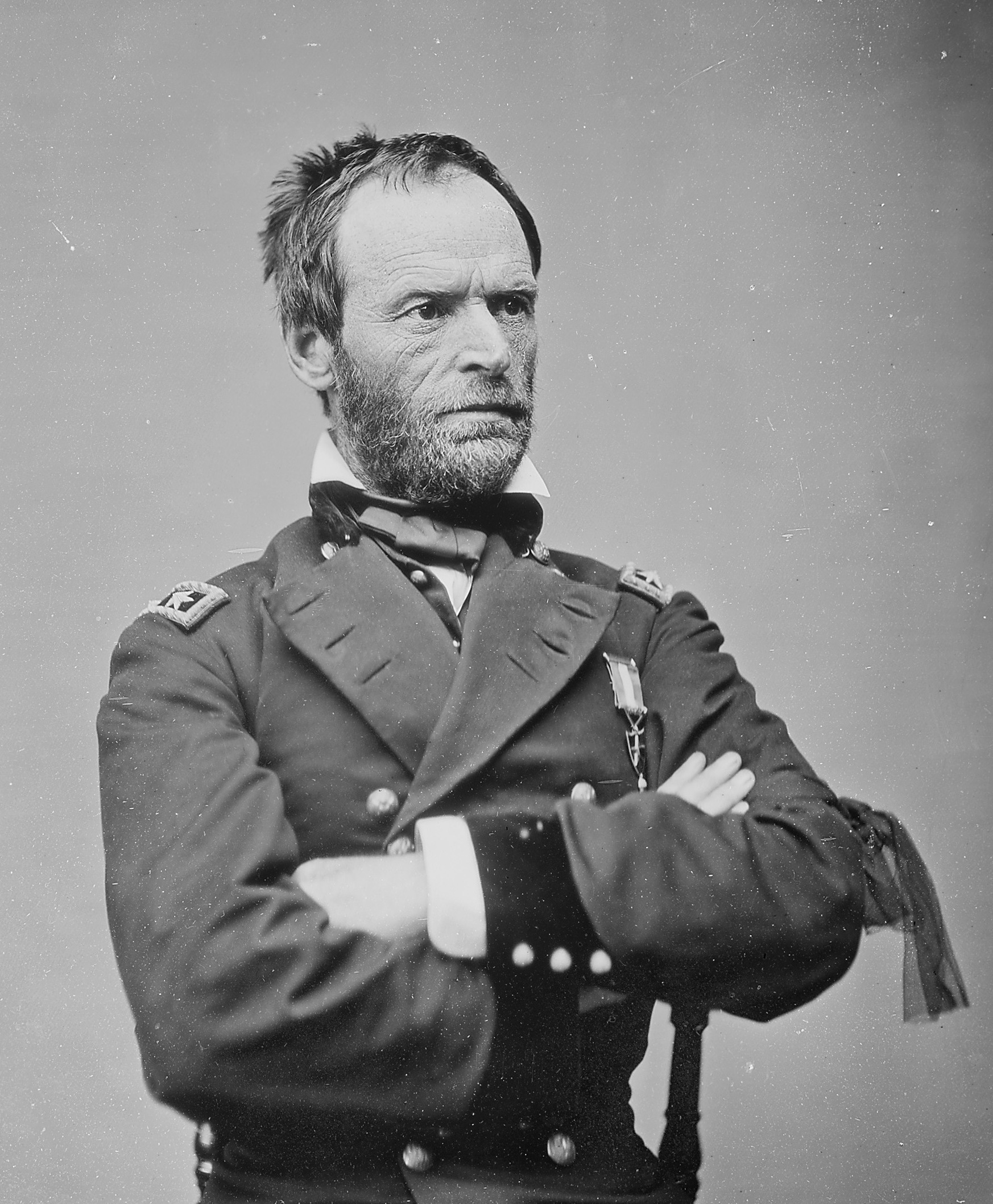
General William T. Sherman, who issued the orders that were the genesis of forty acres and a mule

Forty acres and a mule refers to a key part of Special Field Orders, No. 15 (series 1865), a wartime order proclaimed by Union general William Tecumseh Sherman on January 16, 1865, during the American Civil War, to allot land to some freed families, in plots of land no larger than 40 acres (16 ha). Sherman later ordered the army to lend mules for the agrarian reform effort. The field orders followed a series of conversations between Secretary of War Edwin M. Stanton and Radical Republican abolitionists Charles Sumner and Thaddeus Stevens following disruptions to the institution of slavery provoked by the American Civil War. They provided for the confiscation of 400,000 acres (160,000 ha) of land along the Atlantic coast of South Carolina, Georgia, and Florida and the dividing of it into parcels of not more than 40 acres (16 ha), on which were to be settled approximately 18,000 formerly enslaved families and other black people then living in the area.

Many freed people believed, after being told by various political figures, that they had a right to own the land they had been forced to work as slaves and were eager to control their own property. Freed people widely expected to legally claim 40 acres of land. However, Abraham Lincoln's successor as president, Andrew Johnson, tried to reverse the intent of Sherman's wartime Order No. 15 and similar provisions included in the second Freedmen's Bureau bills.

Some land redistribution occurred under military jurisdiction during the war and for a brief period thereafter. However, federal and state policy during the Reconstruction era emphasized wage labor, not land ownership, for black people. Almost all land allocated during the war was restored to its pre-war white owners. Several black communities did maintain control of their land, and some families obtained new land by homesteading. Black land ownership increased markedly in Mississippi, particularly during the 19th century. The state had much undeveloped bottomland (low-lying alluvial land near a river) behind riverfront areas that had been cultivated before the war. Most black people acquired land through private transactions, with ownership peaking at 15 million acres (6.1 million hectares) or ~23,000 square miles in 1910, before an extended financial recession caused problems that resulted in the loss of property for many.

== Background ==
African Americans faced severe discrimination and were maintained as a distinct "racial" group by laws requiring racial segregation and prohibiting miscegenation. Free African Americans were often perceived as a job-stealing threat to society because they were usually willing to work for lower wages than white people. Moreover, they were seen as a dangerous influence on those who remained enslaved. Because of this, freed slaves were unwelcome in most areas of the United States.

In the South, vagrancy laws had allowed the states to force free African Americans into labor and sometimes to sell them into slavery. Nevertheless, free African Americans across the country performed a variety of occupations, including a small number who owned and operated successful farms. Others settled in Upper Canada (now Southern Ontario), an endpoint of the Underground Railroad, and in Nova Scotia.

In contrast to the northern United States where free African Americans were able to acquire substantial real estate, the institution of slavery in the southern United States deprived multiple generations of African Americans of the opportunity to own land. Legally, slaves could not own anything. But in practice, observed historian Dylan C. Penningroth, some enslaved people were permitted to "have possessions they could think of as property." These possessions might be confiscated by their enslavers at any time, with no recourse. As legal slavery came to an end, white people did not agree on how freed slaves ought to be treated. Some maintained that the lands the freed slaves had farmed without compensation should be confiscated from their former owners and given to them. Others, fearing the "race"-mixing that allowing them to remain in the U.S. would inevitably bring about, wanted them sent "somewhere else". Plans for a colony of freed slaves began in 1801 when James Monroe asked President Thomas Jefferson to help create a penal colony for rebellious blacks.

The American Colonization Society (ACS) was formed in 1816 to address the issue of free African Americans through settlement (not resettlement) abroad. Although there was discussion of settling them in some undeveloped land in the new western territories or helping them emigrate to Canada or Mexico, the ACS decided to send them to Africa. They chose the closest available land, thereby minimizing transportation costs. However, colonization was slow and expensive and of little interest to most African Americans who had no ties with or interest in Africa. Some former slaves expressed that they were no more African than white Americans were British. Between 1822 and the American Civil War, the American Colonization Society had migrated approximately 15,000 free African Americans to Liberia. However, this number represented only a small fraction of the 7.5 million enslaved people who were about to be free. With mass emancipation looming, there was no consensus about what to do with the soon-to-be-free black slaves. This issue had long been known to white authorities as "The Negro Problem".

Issuing a land grant to an entire class of people was not unusual in the 18th and 19th centuries. There was so much land that it was often given freely to anyone willing to farm it. For example, Thomas Jefferson included in his draft of a revolutionary constitution for Virginia in 1776 a proposed grant of 50 acres to any free man who did not already own that amount. Subsequently, the Preemption Act of 1841, followed by several Homestead Acts that were passed between 1862 and 1916, variously granted between 160 and 640 acres (a quarter section to a full section) of land. However, free African Americans were not generally eligible for homesteading because they were not citizens. This changed with the passage of the Fourteenth Amendment in 1868 which granted citizenship to "all persons born or naturalized in the United States". This was further solidified by the passage of the Fifteenth Amendment in 1870 which granted all citizens, regardless of "race, color, or previous condition of servitude", the right to vote.

== War ==
Congress passed the Confiscation Act of 1861, allowing the Union Army to legitimately confiscate property during its conflict with the South. This law authorized the troops to seize rebel property, including land and slaves. In fact, it reflected the rapidly expanding reality of black refugee camps that had sprung up around the Union Army. These obvious manifestations of the "Negro Problem" sparked antagonism among many Union rank-and-file members, necessitating officer-led leadership.

=== Grand Contraband Camp ===
After secession, the Union maintained its control over Fort Monroe in Hampton on the coast of Southern Virginia. Escaped slaves rushed to the area, hoping for protection from the Confederate Army. (Even more quickly, the town's white residents fled to Richmond.) General Benjamin Butler set a precedent for Union forces on May 24, 1861, when he refused to surrender escaped slaves to Confederates claiming ownership. Butler declared the slaves contraband of war and allowed them to remain with the Union Army. By July 1861, there were 300 "contraband" slaves working for rations at Fort Monroe. By the end of July there were 900, and General Butler appointed Edward L. Pierce as Commissioner of Negro Affairs.

Confederate raiders under General John B. Magruder burnt the nearby town of Hampton, Virginia on August 7, 1861, but the "contraband" blacks occupied its ruins. They established a shantytown known as the Grand Contraband Camp. Many worked for the Army at a rate of $10.00/month, but these wages were not sufficient for them to make major improvements in housing. Conditions in the Camp grew worse, and Northern humanitarian groups sought to intervene on behalf of its 64,000 residents. Captain C. B. Wilder was appointed to organize a response. The perceived humanitarian crisis may have hastened Lincoln's plans for colonizing Île-à-Vache.

A plan developed in September 1862 would have relocated refugees en masse to Massachusetts and other northern states. This plan—initiated by John A. Dix and supported by Captain Wilder and Secretary of War Stanton—drew negative reactions from Republicans who wanted to avoid connecting northward black migration with the newly announced Emancipation Proclamation. Fear of competition by black workers, as well as generalized racial prejudice, made the prospect of black refugees unpalatable for Massachusetts politicians.

With support from orders from General Rufus Saxton, General Butler and Captain Wilder pursued local resettlement operations, providing many of the blacks in Hampton with two acres of land and tools with which to work. Others were assigned jobs as servants in the North. Various smaller camps and colonies were formed, including the Freedmen's Colony of Roanoke Island. Hampton was well known as one of the War's first and biggest refugee camps, and served as a sort of model for other settlements.

=== Sea Islands ===
The Union Army occupied the Sea Islands after the November 1861 Battle of Port Royal, leaving the area's many cotton plantations to the black farmers who worked on them. The early liberation of the Sea Island blacks, and the relatively unusual absence of the former white masters, raised the issue of how the South might be organized after the fall of slavery. Lincoln, commented State Department official Adam Gurowski, "is frightened with the success in South Carolina, as in his opinion this success will complicate the question of slavery." In the early days of federal occupation, troops were badly mistreating the island's residents, and had raided plantation supplies of food and clothing. One Union officer was caught preparing to secretly transport a group of blacks to Cuba, in order to sell them as slaves. Abuses by Union troops continued even after a stable regime had been established.

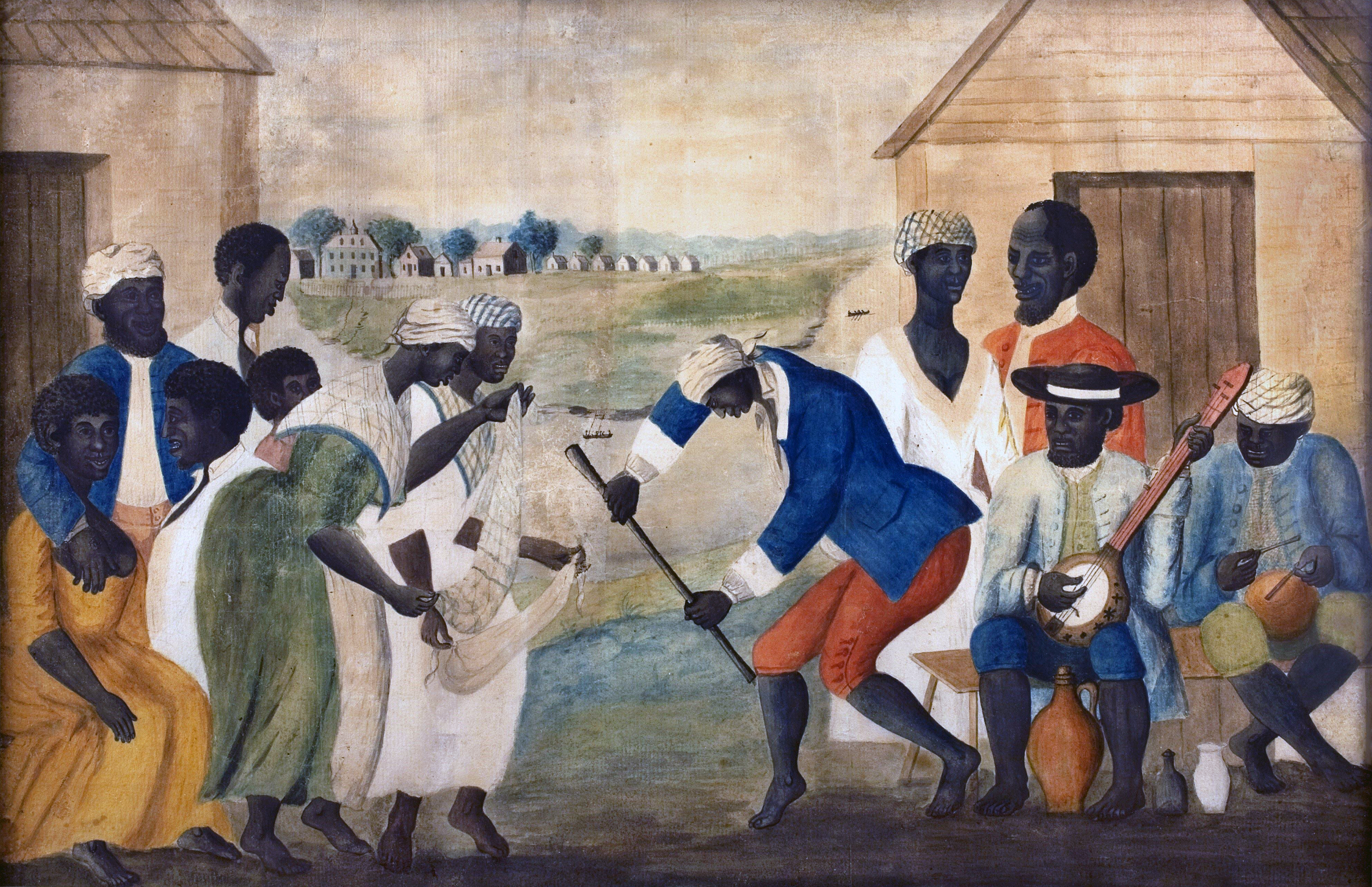
Gullah slaves had farmed the Sea Islands for several generations.

Treasury Secretary Salmon P. Chase had in December deployed Colonel William H. Reynolds to collect and sell whatever cotton could be confiscated from the Sea Island plantations. Soon after, Chase deployed Edward Pierce (after his brief period at Grand Contraband Camp) to assess the situation in Port Royal. Pierce found a plantation under strict Army control, paying wages too low to enable economic independence; he also criticized the Army's policy of shipping cotton North to be ginned. Pierce reported that the black workers were experts in cotton farming but required white managers "to enforce a paternal discipline". He recommended the establishment of a supervised black farming collective to prepare the workers for the responsibilities of citizenship—and to serve as a model for post-slavery labor relations in the South.

The Treasury Department sought to raise money and in many cases was already leasing occupied territories to Northern capitalists for private management. For Port Royal Colonel Thomas had already prepared an arrangement of this type; but Pierce insisted that Port Royal offered the chance to "settle a great social question": namely, whether "when properly organized, and with proper motives set before them, [blacks] will as freemen be as industrious as any race of men are likely to be in this climate." Chase sent Pierce to see President Lincoln. As Pierce later described the encounter:

Mr. Lincoln, who was then chafing under a prospective bereavement, listened for a few moments, and then said, somewhat impatiently, that he did not think he ought to be troubled with such details, that there seemed to be an itching to get negroes into our lines; to which I replied that these negroes were within them by the invitation of no one, being domiciled there before we began occupation. The President then wrote and handed to me the following card :

I shall be obliged if the Secretary of the Treasury will in his discretion give Mr. Pierce such instructions in regard to Port Royal contrabands as may seem judicious. A. LINCOLN.

Pierce accepted this reluctant mandate, but feared that "some unhappy compromise" might compromise his plan to engineer black citizenship.

==== Port Royal Experiment ====
The collective was established and became known as the Port Royal Experiment: a possible model for black economic activity after slavery. The Experiment attracted support from Northerners like economist Edward Atkinson, who hoped to prove his theory that free labor would be more productive than slave labor. More traditional abolitionists like Maria Weston Chapman also praised Pierce's plan. Civic groups like the American Missionary Association provided enthusiastic assistance. These sympathetic Northerners quickly recruited a boatload (53 chosen from a pool of applicants several times larger) of Ivy League and divinity school graduates who set off for Port Royal on March 3, 1862.

The residents of Port Royal generally resented the military and civilian occupiers, who exhibited racist superiority in varying degrees of overtness. Joy turned to sorrow when, on May 12 Union soldiers arrived to draft all able-bodied black men previously liberated on April 13, 1862, by General David Hunter who proclaimed slavery abolished in Georgia, South Carolina, and Alabama. Hunter kept his regiment even after Lincoln reversed this tri-state emancipation proclamation; but disbanded almost all of it when unable to draw payroll from the War Department. Black farmers preferred to grow vegetables and catch fish, whereas the missionaries (and other whites on the islands) encouraged monoculture of cotton as a cash crop. In the thinking of the latter, civilization would be advanced by incorporating blacks into the consumer economy dominated by Northern manufacturing.

Meanwhile, various conflicts arose among the missionaries, the Army, and the merchants whom Chase and Reynolds had invited to Port Royal in order to confiscate all that could be sold. On balance, however, the white sponsors of the Experiment had perceived positive results; businessman John Murray Forbes in May 1862 called it "a decided success", announcing that Blacks would indeed work in exchange for wages.

Secretary of War Edwin M. Stanton appointed General Rufus Saxton as military governor of Port Royal in April 1862, and by December Saxton was agitating for permanent black control over the land. He won support from Stanton, Chase, Sumner, and President Lincoln, but met continuing resistance from a tax commission that wanted to sell the land. Saxton also received approval to train a black militia, which formally became the 1st South Carolina Volunteers on January 1, 1863, when the Emancipation Proclamation legalized its existence.

==== Landownership in the Sea Islands ====
As elsewhere, black workers felt strongly that they had a claim to the lands they worked.

The Confiscation Act of 1862 allowed the Treasury Department to sell many captured lands on the grounds of delinquent taxes. All told, the government now claimed 76,775 acres of Sea Island land. Auditors arrived in Port Royal and began to assess the estates now occupied by blacks and missionaries. The stakes were high: the Sea Island cotton harvest represented a lucrative commodity for Northern investors to control.

Most of the whites involved in the project felt that black ownership of the land should be its final result. Saxton—along with journalists including Free South editor James G. Thompson, and missionaries including Methodist minister Mansfield French—lobbied hard for distribution of the land to black owners. In January 1863, Saxton unilaterally halted the Treasury Department's tax sale on the grounds of military necessity.

The tax commissioners conducted the auction regardless, selling ten thousand acres of land. Eleven plantations went to a consortium ("The Boston Concern") headed by Edward Philbrick, who sold the land in 1865 to black farmers. One black farming collective outbid the outside investors, paying an average of $7.00 per acre for the 470 plantation on which they already lived and worked. Overall, the majority of the land was sold to Northern investors and remained under their control.

In September 1863, Lincoln announced a plan to auction 60,000 acres of South Carolina land in lots of 320 acres—setting aside 16,000 acres of the land for "heads of families of the African race", who could obtain 20-acre lots sold at $1.25/acre (equivalent to $33 in 2025). Tax Commissioner William Brisbane envisioned racial integration on the islands, with large plantation owners employing landless blacks. But Saxton and French considered the 16,000-acre reserve to be inadequate, and instructed black families to stake claims and build houses on all 60,000 acres of the land. French traveled to Washington in December 1863 to lobby for legal confirmation of the plan. At French's urging, Chase and Lincoln authorized Sea Island families (and solitary wives of soldiers in the Union Army) to claim 40-acre plots. Other individuals over the age of 21 would be allowed to claim 20 acres. These plots would be purchased at $1.25 per acre, with 40% paid upfront and 60% paid later. With a requirement of six months' prior residency, the order functionally restricted settlement to blacks, missionaries, and others who were already involved in the Experiment.

Claims to land under the new plan began to arrive immediately, but Commissioner Brisbane ignored them, hoping for another reversal of the decision in Washington. Chase did indeed reverse his position in February, restoring the plan for a tax sale. The sale took place in late February, with land selling for an average price of more than $11/acre (equivalent to $226 in 2025). The sale provoked outcry from freedpeople who had already claimed land according to Chase's December order.

==== "Negroes of Savannah" ====
Major General William Tecumseh Sherman's "March to the Sea" brought a massive regiment of the Union Army to the Georgia coast in December 1864. Accompanying the Army were an estimated ten thousand black refugees, former slaves. This group was already suffering from starvation and disease. Many former slaves had become disillusioned by the Union Army, having suffered pillaging, rape, and other abuses. They arrived in Savannah "after long marches and severe privations, weary, famished, sick, and almost naked. On December 19, Sherman dispatched many of these slaves to Hilton Head, an island already serving as refugee camp. Saxton reported on December 22 "Every cabin and house on these islands is filled to overflowing—I have some 15,000." 700 more arrived on Christmas.

On January 11, 1865, Secretary of War Edwin Stanton arrived in Savannah with Quartermaster General Montgomery C. Meigs and other officials. This group met with Generals Sherman and Saxton to discuss the refugee crisis. They decided, in turn, to consult leaders from the local Black community and ask them: "What do you want for your own people?" A meeting was duly arranged.

At 8:00 PM on January 12, 1865, Sherman met with a group of twenty people, many of whom had been slaves for most of their lives. The blacks of Savannah had seized the opportunity of emancipation to strengthen their community's institutions, and they had strong political feelings. They selected one spokesperson: Garrison Frazier, the 67-year-old former pastor of Third African Baptist. In the late 1850s, he had for $1,000 bought freedom for himself and his wife. Frazier had consulted with the refugees as well as the other representatives. He told Sherman: "The way we can best take care of ourselves is to have land, and turn it and till it by our own labor." Frazier suggested that young men would serve the government in fighting the Rebels, and that therefore "the women and children and old men" would have to work this land. Almost all of those present agreed to request land grants for autonomous black communities, on the grounds that racial hatred would prevent economic advancement for blacks in mixed areas.

==== Sherman's Special Field Orders, No. 15 ====
Sherman's Special Field Orders, No. 15, issued on January 16, 1865, instructed officers to settle these refugees on the Sea Islands and inland: 400,000 total acres divided into 40-acre plots. Though mules (beasts of burden used for plowing) were not mentioned, some of its beneficiaries did receive them from the army. Such plots were colloquially known as "Blackacres".

Sherman's orders specifically allocated "the islands from Charleston, south, the abandoned rice fields along the rivers for thirty miles back from the sea, and the country bordering the St. Johns River, Florida." The order specifically prohibits whites from settling in this area. Saxton, who, with Stanton, helped to craft the document, was promoted to major general and charged with oversight of the new settlement. On February 3, Saxton addressed a large freedpeople's meeting at Second African Baptist, announcing the order and outlining preparations for new settlement. By June 1865, about 40,000 freed people were settled on 435,000 acres (180,000 ha) in the Sea Islands.

The Special Field Orders were issued by Sherman, not the federal government with regards to all former slaves, and he issued similar ones "throughout the campaign to assure the harmony of action in the area of operations." It was claimed by some that these settlements were never intended to last. However, this was never the understanding of the settlers—nor of General Saxton, who said he asked Sherman to cancel the order unless it was meant to be permanent.

In practice, the areas of land settled were quite variable. James Chaplin Beecher observed that the "so called 40 acre tract[s] vary in size from eight acres to (450) four hundred and fifty." Some areas were settled by groups: Skidaway Island was colonized by a group of over 1000 people, including Reverend Ulysses L. Houston.

==== Significance ====
The Sea Islands project reflected a policy of "40 acres and a mule" as the basis for post-slavery economics. Especially in 1865, the precedent it set was highly visible to newly free blacks seeking land of their own.

Freedpeople from across the region flocked to the area in search of land. The result was refugee camps afflicted by disease and short on supplies.

Especially after Sherman's Orders, the coastal settlements generated enthusiasm for a new society that would supplant the slave system. Reported one journalist in April 1865: "It was the Plymouth colony repeating itself. They agreed if any others came to join them, they should have equal privileges. So blooms the Mayflower on the South Atlantic Coast."

=== Wage labor system ===
Beginning in occupied Louisiana under General Nathaniel P. Banks, the military developed a wage-labor system for cultivating large areas of land. This system—which took effect with Lincoln and Stanton's blessing soon after the Emancipation Proclamation legitimized contracts with the freedpeople—offered ironclad one-year contracts to freedpeople. The contract promised $10/month as well as provisions and medical care. The system was soon also adopted by General Lorenzo Thomas in Mississippi.

Sometimes land came under the control of Treasury officials. Jurisdictional disputes erupted between the Treasury Department and the military. Criticism of Treasury Department profiteering by General John Eaton and journalists who witnessed the new form of plantation labor influenced public opinion in the North and pressured Congress to support direct control of land by freedmen. The Treasury Department, particularly as Secretary Chase prepared to seek the Republican nomination in 1864, accused the military of treating the freedpeople inhumanely. Lincoln decided in favor of military rather than Treasury jurisdiction, and the wage labor system became more deeply established. Abolitionist critics of the policy called it no better than serfdom.

=== Davis Bend ===
One of the largest black landownership projects took place at Davis Bend, Mississippi, the 11,000-acre site of plantations owned by Joseph Davis and his famous younger brother Jefferson, president of the Confederacy. Influenced by some aspects of Robert Owen's socialism, Joseph Davis had established the experimental 4000-acre Hurricane Plantation in 1827 at Davis Bend. Davis allowed several hundred slaves to eat nutritious food, live in well-built cottages, receive medical care, and resolve their disputes in a weekly "Hall of Justice" court. His motto was: "The less people are governed, the more submissive they will be to control." Davis relied heavily on the managerial skills of Ben Montgomery, a well-educated slave who conducted much of the plantation's business.

The Battle of Shiloh began a period of turmoil (1862–1863), at Davis Bend, although its black residents continued farming. The plantation was occupied by two companies of black Union troops in December 1863. Under the command of Colonel Samuel Thomas, these soldiers began to fortify the area. General Ulysses S. Grant had expressed a desire to make of the Davis plantations "a negro paradise." Thomas began to lease the land to black tenants for the 1864 crop season. Black refugees who had gathered in Vicksburg moved en masse to Davis Bend under the auspices of the Freedman's Department (an agency created by the military prior to Congressional authorization of the "Freedmen's Bureau", discussed below).

Davis Bend was caught in the middle of the turf war between the military and the Treasury Department. In February 1864, the Treasury re-confiscated 2000 acres of Davis Bend, restoring them to white owners who had sworn loyalty oaths. It also leased 1,200 acres to Northern investors. Although Thomas resisted instructions to prevent the free blacks from farming, General Eaton ordered him to comply. Eaton also ordered Thomas to confiscate farming equipment held by blacks, on the grounds that—because Mississippi law banned slaves from owning property—they must have stolen such possessions. The Treasury Department sought to charge the plantation workers a fee for using the cotton gin. The residents of Davis Bend objected strenuously to these measures. In a petition signed by 56 farmers (including Montgomery) and published in the New Orleans Tribune:

At the commencement of our present year, this plantation was, in compliance with an order of our Post Commander, deprived of horses, mules, oxen and farming utensils of every description, very much of which had been captured and brought into Union lines by the undersigned; in consequence of which deprivations, we were, of course, reduced to the necessity of buying everything necessary for farming, and having thus far succeeded in performing by far the most expensive and laborious part of our work, we are prepared to accomplish the ginning, pressing, weighing, marking, consigning, etc., in a business-like order if allowed to do so.

== Freedmen's Bureau ==
From 1863 to 1865, Congress debated what policies it might adopt to address the social issues that would confront the South after the war. The Freedmen's Aid Society pushed for a "Bureau of Emancipation" to assist in the economic transition away from slavery. It used Port Royal as evidence that blacks could live and work on their own. Land reform was often discussed, though some objected that too much capital would be required to ensure the success of black farmers. On January 31, 1865, the House of Representatives approved the 13th Amendment, which outlaws slavery and involuntary servitude except in the case of punishment.

Congress continued to debate the economic and social status of the free population, with land reform identified as critical to realizing black freedom. A bill drafted in conference committee to provide limited land tenure for one year while authorizing military supervision of freedmen was rejected in the Senate by abolitionists who thought it did not do justice to the freedmen. A six-person committee quickly wrote "an entirely new bill" which substantially increased its promise to the freedmen.

This stronger version of the bill passed both houses on March 3, 1865. With this bill, Congress established the Bureau of Refugees, Freedmen, and Abandoned Lands under the War Department. The Bureau had authority to provide supplies for refugees—and an unfunded mandate to redistribute land, in parcels of up to 40 acres:

Sec. 4. And be it further enacted, That the commissioner, under the direction of the President, shall have authority to set apart, for the use of loyal refugees and freedmen, such tracts of land within the insurrectionary states as shall have been abandoned, or to which the United States shall have acquired title by confiscation or sale, or otherwise, and to every male citizen, whether refugee or freedman, as aforesaid, there shall be assigned not more than forty acres of such land, and the person to whom it was so assigned shall be protected in the use and enjoyment of the land for the term of three years at an annual rent not exceeding six per centum upon the value of such land, as it was appraised by the state authorities in the year eighteen hundred and sixty, for the purpose of taxation, and in case no such appraisal can be found, then the rental shall be based upon the estimated value of the land in said year, to be ascertained in such manner as the commissioner may by regulation prescribe. At the end of said term, or at any time during said term, the occupants of any parcels so assigned may purchase the land and receive such title thereto as the United States can convey, upon paying therefor the value of the land, as ascertained and fixed for the purpose of determining the annual rent aforesaid.

The bill thus established a system in which Southern blacks could lease abandoned and confiscated land, with yearly rent at 6% (or less) of the land's value (assessed for tax purposes in 1860). After three years, they would have the option to buy this land at full price. The Bureau in charge, which became known as the Freedmen's Bureau, was placed under the continuing supervision of the military because Congress anticipated the need to defend black settlements from White Southerners. The bill mandated institutionalized black landownership of the same land that had formerly relied on their unpaid labor.

After Lincoln's assassination, Andrew Johnson became president. On May 29, 1865, Johnson issued an amnesty proclamation to ordinary Southern citizens who swore loyalty oaths, promising not only political immunity but also return of confiscated property. (Johnson's proclamation excluded Confederate politicians, military officers, and landowners with property worth more than $20,000.) General O. O. Howard, chief of the Freedmen's Bureau, requested an interpretation from Attorney General James Speed regarding how this proclamation would affect the Freedmen's Bureau mandate. Speed replied on June 22, 1865, that the Bureau Commissioner:

... has authority, under the direction of the President, to set apart for the use of loyal refugees and freedmen the lands in question; and he is required to assign to every male of that class of persons, not more than forty acres of such lands.

=== Circular #13 ===
Howard acted quickly based on the authorization from Speed, ordering an inventory of lands available for redistribution and resisting white Southerners' attempts to reclaim property. At its peak in 1865, the Freedmen's Bureau controlled 800,000–900,000 acres of plantation lands previously belonging to slave owners. This area represented 0.2% of land in the South; ultimately the Johnson proclamation required the Bureau to re-allocate most of it to its former owners.

On July 28, 1865, Howard issued "Circular no. 13", a directive within the Freedmen's Bureau to issue land to refugees and freedmen. Circular no. 13 explicitly instructed Bureau agents to prioritize the Congressional mandate for land distribution over Johnson's amnesty declaration. Its final section clarified: "The pardon of the President will not be understood to extend to the surrender of abandoned or confiscated property which by law has been 'set apart for Refugees and Freedmen'". With Circular #13, land redistribution was an official policy for the entire South, and understood as such by army officers.

After issuing Circular 13, however, Howard, seemingly unaware of how significant and controversial his instructions might prove, left Washington for a vacation in Maine. President Johnson and others began to counteract the Circular almost immediately. After Johnson ordered the Bureau to restore the estate of a complaining Tennessee plantation owner, General Joseph S. Fullerton suggested to at least one subordinate that Circular #13 "will not be observed for the present".

When Howard returned to Washington, Johnson ordered him to write a new Circular that would respect his policy of land restoration. Johnson rejected Howard's draft and wrote his own version, which he issued on September 12 as Circular #15—including Howard's name. Circular #15 established strict criteria for designating a property as "officially confiscated" and had the effect in many places of ending land redistribution completely.

Especially during the six-week period between Circular #13 and Circular #15, '40 acres and a mule' (along with other supplies necessary for farming) represented a common promise of Freedmen's Bureau agents. Clinton B. Fisk, Assistant Commissioner of the Freedmen's Bureau for Kentucky and Tennessee, had announced at a black political assembly: "They must not only have freedom but homes of their own, thirty or forty acres, with mules, cottages, and schoolhouses etc."

A Bureau administrator in Virginia proposed leasing to each family a 40-acre plot of land, a pair of mules, harnesses, a cart, tools, seeds, and food supplies. The family would pay for these supplies after growing crops and selling them.

=== Black Codes ===
Bureau agents encountered legal problems in allocating land to freed people as a result of the "Black Codes" passed by Southern legislatures in late 1865 and 1866. Some of the new laws prevented black people from owning or leasing land. The Freedmen's Bureau generally treated the black Codes as invalid, based on federal legislation. However, the Bureau was not always able to enforce its interpretation after the Union Army had substantially demobilized.

== Colonization and homesteading ==
During and after the war, politicians, generals and others envisioned a variety of colonization plans that would have provided real estate to black families. Although the American Colonization Society had been colonizing more people in Liberia and receiving more donations (almost one million dollars in the 1850s), it did not have the means to respond to mass emancipation.

A 2020 study contrasted the successful distribution of free land to former slaves in the Cherokee Nation with the failure to give free land to former slaves in the Confederacy. The study found that even though levels of inequality in 1860 were similar in the Cherokee Nation and the Confederacy, former black slaves prospered in the Cherokee Nation over the next decades. The Cherokee Nation had lower levels of racial inequality, higher incomes for black people, higher literacy rates among black people, and greater school attendance rates among black people.

=== Foreign colonization plans ===
Lincoln had long supported colonization as a plausible solution to the problem of slavery, and pursued colonization plans throughout his presidency. In 1862, Congress approved $600,000 to fund Lincoln's plan for colonizing blacks "in a climate congenial to them", and granted Lincoln broad executive powers to orchestrate colonization. Lincoln immediately created an Emigration Office within the Department of the Interior and instructed the State Department to acquire suitable land. The first major plan considered would have sent employed free blacks as coal miners in Chiriquí Province, Panama (then part of Gran Colombia). Volunteers were promised 40 acres of land and a job in the mines; Senator Samuel C. Pomeroy, whom Lincoln had appointed to oversee the plan, had also purchased mules, yokes, tools, wagons, seeds, and other supplies to support a potential colony. Pomeroy accepted 500 of the 13,700 people who applied for the job. However, the plan was canceled by the end of the year, thanks to a discovery that Chiriquí's coal was of poor quality.

Like Liberia, an independent black nation, Haiti was also considered a good place to colonize freedpeople from the U.S. As the Chiriquí plan was hitting its stride in 1862, Lincoln was developing another plan to colonize the small island of Île à Vache near Haiti. Lincoln struck a deal with businessman Bernard Kock, who had obtained rights to lease the island for cultivation and wood-cutting. A total of 453 Blacks, mostly young men from the Tidewater region around occupied Hampton, Virginia, volunteered to colonize the island. On April 14, 1863, they left Fort Monroe in the "Ocean Ranger". Kock confiscated all of the money possessed by the colonists and did not pay their wages. Initial reports suggested dire conditions, though these were later disputed. A number of colonists died in the first year. 292 survivors from the original group remained on the island and 73 had moved to Aux Cayes; most were restored to the U.S. by a mission of the Navy in February 1864. Congress rescinded Lincoln's colonization authority in July 1863.

Lincoln continued to pursue colonization plans, particularly in the British West Indies, but none came to fruition. The American Colonization Society settled a few hundred people in Liberia during the war, and several thousand more in the five years following.

=== Domestic colonization plans ===
Confederate general Nathan Bedford Forrest had proposed in 1865 before the end of the war to hire black soldiers and freedmen in constructing a railroad for the Memphis and Little Rock Railroad Company, paying them with $1 (~$21.00 in 2025)/day and land along the railway line. This proposal later gained the endorsements of Sherman, Howard, Johnson, and Arkansas Governor Isaac Murphy. Howard transported several hundred freedmen from Alabama to Arkansas for work on the line. He appointed Edward Ord to supervise the project and protect the freedmen from Forrest.

=== Southern Homesteading Act ===
As it became clear that the pool of land available for blacks was rapidly shrinking, the Union discussed various proposals for how blacks might resettle and eventually own their own land. In Virginia, the mass of landless blacks represented a growing crisis—soon to be exacerbated by the return of 10,000 black soldiers from Texas. Concerned about a possible insurrection, Colonel Orlando Brown (head of the Freedmen's Bureau in Virginia) proposed relocating Virginia's blacks to Texas or Florida. Brown proposed that the federal government reserve 500,000 acres in Florida for colonization by the soldiers and 50,000 other free blacks from Virginia. Howard took Brown's proposal to Congress.

In December 1865, Congress began to debate the "Second Freedmen's Bureau bill", which would have opened three million acres of unoccupied public land in Florida, Mississippi, and Arkansas for homesteading. (An amendment to allow black homesteading on public lands in the North was defeated.) Congress passed the bill in February 1866 but could not override Johnson's veto. (Congress passed a more limited "Second Freedmen's Bureau Bill" in July 1866, and did override Johnson's veto.)

Howard continued to push for Congress to appropriate land for allocation to freedmen. With support from Thaddeus Stevens and William Fessenden, Congress began to debate a new bill for black settlement of public lands in the South. The result was the Southern Homestead Act, which opened 46,398,544.87 acres of land in Florida, Alabama, Louisiana, Mississippi and Arkansas to homesteading; initially 80-acre parcels (half-quarter section) until June 1868, and thereafter 160-acre parcels (quarter section). Johnson signed this bill and it went into effect on June 21, 1866. Until January 1, 1867, the bill specified, only free blacks and loyal whites would be allowed access to these lands.

Howard, concerned about competition with Confederates that would begin in 1867, ordered Bureau agents to inform free blacks about the Homesteading Act. Local commissioners did not disseminate the information widely, and many freedpeople were unwilling to venture into unknown territory, with insufficient supplies, based only on the promise of land after five years.

Those who did attempt homesteading encountered unreliable bureaucracy that often did not comply with federal law. They also faced extremely harsh conditions, usually on low quality land that had been rejected by white settlers in years past. Nevertheless, free blacks entered about 6,500 claims to homesteads; about 1000 of these eventually resulted in property certificates.

== Outcomes ==
Southern landowners regained control over almost all of the land they had claimed before the war. The national dialogue about land ownership as a key to success for freed people gave way (in the sphere of white politics and media) to the implementation of a plantation wage system. Under pressure from Johnson and other pro-capital politicians in the North, and from almost all of white society in the South, the Freedmen's Bureau was transformed from a protector of land rights to an enforcer of wage labor.

Free blacks in the South widely believed that all land would be redistributed to those who had worked on it. They also felt strongly that they had a right to own this land. Many expected this event to occur by Christmas 1865 or New Year's 1866. Although the freedpeople formed this belief in response to the policies of the Freedmen's Bureau and Circular #13, their hopes were soon downplayed as superstition akin to belief in Santa Claus.

Hope for "40 acres and a mule" specifically was prevalent beginning in early 1865. The expectation of "40 acres" came from the explicit terms of Sherman's Field Order and the Freedmen's Bureau bill. The "mule" may have been added simply as an obvious necessity for achieving prosperity through agriculture. ("Forty acres" was a slogan, which though it did appear often in formal declarations, represented a wide variety of different arrangements for land ownership and farming.)

A counter-rumor spread among Southern whites that when the land was not redistributed on Christmas, angry blacks would launch a violent insurrection. Alabama and Mississippi passed laws forming White paramilitary groups, which violently disarmed free black people.

According to historian Donald R. Shaffer:

The fact was, however, that not all African Americans were enthusiastic about land redistribution. The black elite in the South, which disproportionately consisted of those who had been free before the war and the lightskinned, tended to emphasize suffrage and equal rights over economic issues. Consisting of property owners, or men who realistically aspired to buy property one day, these black men tended to oppose land confiscation and redistribution. They made common cause with white Republicans on this issue, few of whom supported confiscating land from ex-Confederates—even among the Radical Republicans. The fact that members of the elite predominated among black officeholders during Reconstruction also meant they rarely pushed this issue in Congress or state legislatures (not that it had much chance of passing even if they had, due to white majorities in these bodies). Hence, most African Americans during Reconstruction did not achieve the dramatic economic progress comparable to that demonstrated by their race in politics.

=== Wage labor ===
Southern farm owners complained that because they were waiting for land, the newly free blacks would not readily sign long-term labor contracts. South Carolina Governor James Lawrence Orr asked Johnson in 1866 to continue pushing his land policy, writing that "complete restoration will restore complete harmony".

Black hopes for land came to be seen as a major barrier to economic productivity, and forces from both South and North worked hard to dispel them. Southern governments passed "Black Codes" to prevent blacks from owning or leasing land, and to restrict their freedom of movement. Agents of the Freedmen's Bureau now told blacks that redistribution was impossible and that they would need to perform wage labor to survive. If they could not persuade people to sign contracts, they would insist forcefully. Thomas Conway, the Bureau Commissioner in Louisiana, ordered: "Hire them out! Cut wood! Do anything to avoid a state of idleness." Even Rufus Saxton, who campaigned actively for black property in the Sea Islands, issued a Circular instructing his agents to dispel the rumor of redistribution at New Year's 1866. (The unfunded Bureau drew its own finances from profits generated by freedpeople under contract.) Although some Whites continued to press for colonization, most now believed that black labor could be recuperated through the wage system.

According to many historians, economic negotiations between blacks and whites in the South thus unfolded within the parameters dictated by the Johnson administration. Southern plantation owners pushed blacks toward servitude, while the Republican Congress pushed for free wage labor and civil rights. Eventually, under this framework, sharecropping emerged as the dominant mode of production. Some historians, such as Robert McKenzie, have challenged the prevalence of this "standard scenario" and argued that land ownership fluctuated significantly during the 1870s. Black land ownership did increase across the South.

=== Tidewater Virginia ===
Many blacks who had settled on property surrounding Hampton were forced to leave by various means. These included Johnson's aggressive restoration policy, Black Codes passed by the Virginia legislature, and with vigilante enforcement by returning Confederates. Union troops also forcefully evicted settlers, sometimes provoking violent standoffs; many blacks came to trust the Freedmen's Bureau no more than they did the Rebels. In 1866 Tidewater's refugee camps were still full, and many of their residents were sick and dying. Relations with Northern and Southern whites had become violently hostile. The whites (military occupiers and local residents) agreed on a plan to deport the freedpeople back to their counties of origin.

After the turbulence of restoration, land ownership steadily increased. Hampton already had at least some black landowners, such as the family of American Revolutionary War veteran Caesar Tarrant. In 1860, about eight free Negroes owned land in Hampton. By 1870, approximately 121 free Blacks owned land in the area. Those who owned land before the war expanded their holdings.

Some of the blacks in Hampton formed a community land trust called Lincoln's Land Association and purchased several hundred acres of surrounding land. Land for the Hampton Institute (later Hampton University), was acquired from 1867 to 1872 with assistance from George Whipple of the American Missionary Association. Whipple also helped to sell 44 individual lots to black owners.

Many freedpeople could not afford to purchase land immediately after the war but earned money in jobs outside farming such as fishing and oystering. Black land ownership thus increased even faster (though not for everyone) during the 1870s. In Charles City County, three-quarters of black farm workers owned their own farms, with an average size of 36 acres. In York County, 50% owned their farms, which averaged 20 acres. (Statewide, the number of landowners was high, but the average size of land was only 4 acres.) These relatively small farms, on relatively poor land, did not generate enormous profits. However, they did constitute a base of economic power, and blacks from this region held political office at a high rate.

Survivors of the camps also achieved a high level of land ownership and business success in the town of Hampton itself.

=== Sea Islands ===
The May 29 amnesty proclamation did not apply to many Sea Islands landowners; however, most of these had secured special pardons directly from Johnson. General Rufus Saxton was overwhelmed with ownership claims for properties in the "Sherman Reserve". Saxton wrote to Howard on September 5, 1865, asking him to protect black landownership on the Sea Islands:

General, I have the honor to report that the old owners of the lands on the Sea Islands, are making strong efforts to regain possession of them. These Islands were set apart for the colonization of the freedmen, by General Sherman's Special Field Order no. 15: Head Quarters Military Division of the Mississippi: In pursuance of this Order, which was issued as a military necessity, with the full approval and sanction of the Honorable Secretary of War, I, as you are already aware, have colonized some forty (40) thousand Freedmen, on forty (40) acre Tracts. promising them that they should have promissory titles to the same.

I consider that the faith of the Government is solemnly pledged to these people, who have been faithful to it. and that we have no right now to dispossess them of their lands.

I believe that Congress will decide that General Sherman's Order has all the binding effects of a Statute, and that Mr. Stanton will sustain you in not giving up any of these lands to their late owners.

I respectfully ask that this Order which I have carried out in good faith, Shall now be enforced, and that no part or parcel of the lands which have been disposed of under its just provisions, shall, under any circumstances, be restored to the former owners. It seems to me not as wise or prudent to do injustice to those who have always been loyal and true, in order to be lenient to those who have done their best to destroy the nation's life.

Circular no. 15, issued days later, led the land's former owners to increase their efforts. Saxton continued to resist, passing their written requests to Howard with the comment:

The freedmen were promised the protection of the Government in their possession. This order was issued under a great military necessity with the approval of the War Department. I was appointed the executive officer to carry it out. More than forty thousand destitute freedmen have been provided with homes under its promises. I cannot break faith with them now by recommending the restoration of any of these lands. In my opinion this order of General Sherman is as binding as a statute.

Johnson dispatched Howard to the Islands, with instructions to broker a "mutually satisfactory" settlement. Howard understood that this implied a complete restoration of pre-war ownership. He informed the islanders of Johnson's intention. But (with support from Stanton, who felt comfortable with a literal interpretation of the phrase "mutually satisfactory") appointed a sympathetic captain, Alexander P. Ketchum, to form a commission overseeing the transition. Ketchum and Saxton proceeded to resist resettlement claims by Confederate whites.

The settlers formed a solidarity network to resist reclamation of their lands and proved willing to defend their homes with vigorous displays of force. The Sea Island homesteaders also wrote directly to Howard and Johnson, insisting that the government keep its promise and maintain their homesteads.

However, the prevailing political wind continued to favor the Southern landowners. Saxton and Ketchum lost their positions; Daniel Sickles and Robert K. Scott assumed power. In the winter of 1866–1867, Sickles turned the Union Army on the settlers, evicting all those that could not produce the correct deed. Black settlers retained control over 1,565 titles amounting to 63,000 acres. Scott recounted in his report to Congress: "The officers of these detachments in many instances took from the freedmen their certificates, declared them worthless, and destroyed them in their presence. Upon refusing to accept the contracts offered, the people in several instances were thrust out into the highways, where, being without shelter, many perished from small-pox, which prevailed to an alarming extent among them."

Soldiers continued to evict settlers and enforce work agreements, leading in 1867 to a large-scale armed standoff between the Army and a group of farmers who would not renew their contract with a plantation owner. General Davis Tillson in Georgia ordered a modification to the title of black landowners "as to give a man holding one, not forty acres, but as much land as he could work well, say from ten to fifteen acres—and that the balance of the land should be turned over to Messrs. Scuyler and Winchester, who should be allowed to hire the remaining freed people who wish to work for them [...]". 90% of the land on Skidaway Island was confiscated.

The (second) Second Freedmen's Bureau bill, passed in July 1866 over Johnson's veto, stipulated the freedpeople whose lands had been restored to Confederate owners could pay $1.25 (~$27.00 in 2025) per acre for up to 20 acres of land in St. Luke and St. Helena parishes of Beaufort County, South Carolina. This district was overseen by Major Martin R. Delaney, an abolitionist and advocate of black land ownership. About 1,900 families with land titles resettled in Beaufort County, buying 19,040 acres of land at relatively low rates.

Many people remained on the islands and maintained the Gullah culture of their ancestors. Several hundred thousand Gullah people live on the Sea Islands today. Their claim to the land has been threatened in recent decades by developers seeking to build vacation resorts.

=== Davis Bend ===
Thomas denied their request and accused Montgomery of having promoted the petition to further his own profits. Montgomery appealed to Joseph Davis, who had returned to Mississippi in October 1865 and was staying in Vicksburg.

Samuel Thomas was eventually removed from his post. Joseph Davis regained control of his plantation in 1867 and promptly sold it to Benjamin Montgomery for $300,000 (~$5.67 million in 2025). This price, $75 per acre, was comparatively low. The transaction itself was illegal because the Mississippi Black Codes outlawed sale of property to blacks; Davis and Montgomery therefore conducted the deal in secret.

Montgomery invited free blacks to settle the land and work there. In 1887, led by Benjamin's son Isaiah Montgomery, the group founded a new settlement at Mound Bayou, Mississippi. Mound Bayou remains an autonomous and virtually all-Black community.

=== Politics ===
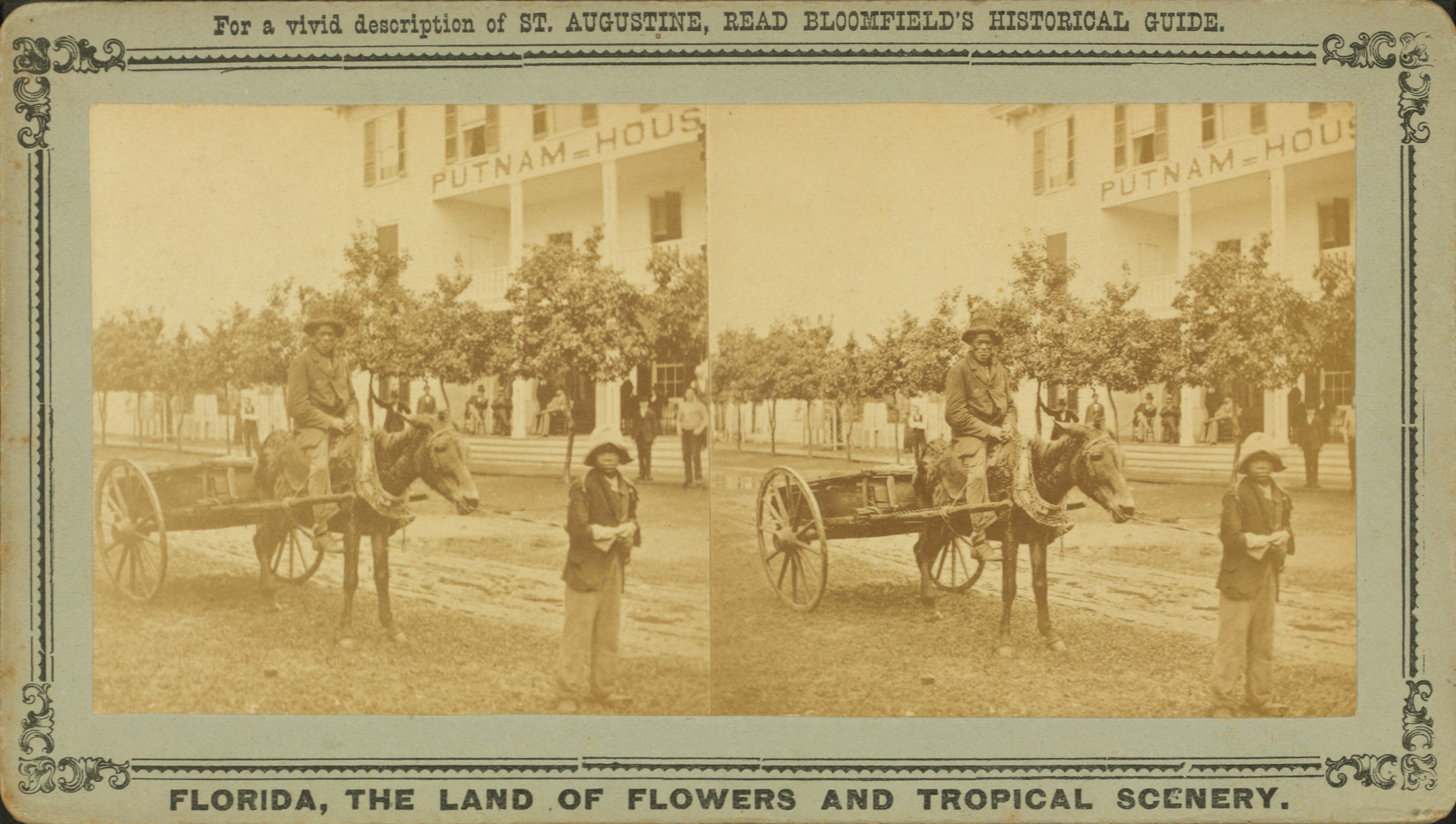
15th Amendment, or the Darkey's millennium - 40 acres of land and a mule, from Robert N. Dennis collection of stereoscopic views.

Thaddeus Stevens and Charles Sumner continued to support land reform for freed people, but were opposed by a large bloc of politicians who did not want to violate property rights or redistribute capital.

Many radical Northerners withdrew their support for land reform in the years following the war. One reason for the shift in political opinion was fear by the Republicans that land ownership might lead Blacks to align with Democrats for economic reasons. In general, politicians turned their focus to the legal status of freed people. In the analysis of W. E. B. Du Bois, black suffrage became more politically palatable precisely as an inexpensive alternative to well-funded agrarian reform.

== Orders ==
The orders were issued following Sherman's March to the Sea. They were intended to address the immediate problem of dealing with the tens of thousands of black refugees who had joined Sherman's march in search of protection and sustenance, and "to assure the harmony of action in the area of operations." Critics allege that his intention was for the order to be a temporary measure to address an immediate problem, and not to grant permanent ownership of the land to the freedmen, although most of the recipients assumed otherwise. General Sherman issued his orders four days after meeting with twenty local black ministers and lay leaders and with U.S. Secretary of War Edwin M. Stanton in Savannah, Georgia. Brig. Gen. Rufus Saxton, an abolitionist from Massachusetts who had previously organized the recruitment of black soldiers for the Union Army, was put in charge of implementing the orders. Freedmen were settled in Georgia, particularly along the Savannah River, in the Ogeechee district of Chatham County, and on islands off of the coast of Savannah.

Special Field Orders No. 15.

Headquarters Military Division of the Mississippi,
In the Field, Savannah, Ga., January 16, 1865.

I. The islands from Charleston south, the abandoned rice-fields along the rivers for thirty miles back from the sea, and the country bordering the Saint Johns River, Fla., are reserved and set apart for the settlement of the Negros now made free by the acts of war and the proclamation of the President of the United States.

II. At Beaufort, Hilton Head, Savannah, Fernandina, Saint Augustine, and Jacksonville the blacks may remain in their chosen or accustomed vocations; but on the islands, and in the settlements hereafter to be established, no white person whatever, unless military officers and soldiers detailed for duty, will be permitted to reside; and the sole and exclusive management of affairs will be left to the freed people themselves, subject only to the United States military authority and the acts of Congress. By the laws of war and orders of the President of the United States the negro is free, and must be dealt with as such. He cannot be subjected to conscription or forced military service, save by the written orders of the highest military authority of the Department, under such regulations as the President or Congress may prescribe; domestic servants, blacksmiths, carpenters, and other mechanics will be free to select their own work and residence, but the young and able-bodied negroes must be encouraged to enlist as soldiers in the service of the United States, to contribute their share toward maintaining their own freedom and securing their rights as citizens of the United States. Negroes so enlisted will be organized into companies, battalions, and regiments, under the orders of the United States military authorities, and will be paid, fed, and clothed according to law. The bounties paid on enlistment may, with the consent of the recruit, go to assist his family and settlement in procuring agricultural implements, seed, tools, boats, clothing, and other articles necessary for their livelihood.

III. Whenever three respectable negroes, heads of families, shall desire to settle on land, and shall have selected for that purpose an island, or a locality clearly defined within the limits above designated, the inspector of settlements and plantations will himself, or by such sub-ordinate officer as he may appoint, give them a license to settle such island or district, and afford them such assistance as he can to enable them to establish a peaceable agricultural settlement. The three parties named will subdivide the land, under the supervision of the inspector, among themselves and such others as may choose to settle near them, so that each family shall have a plot of not more than forty acres of tillable ground, and when it borders on some water channel with not more than 800 feet water front, in the possession of which land the military authorities will afford them protection until such time as they can protect themselves or until Congress shall regulate their title. The quartermaster may, on the requisition of the inspector of settlements and plantations, place at the disposal of the inspector one or more of the captured steamers to ply between the settlements and one or more of the commercial points, heretofore named in orders, to afford the settlers the opportunity to supply their necessary wants and to sell the products of their land and labor.

IV. Whenever a negro has enlisted in the military service of the United States he may locate his family in any one of the settlements at pleasure and acquire a homestead and all other rights and privileges of a settler as though present in person. In like manner negroes may settle their families and engage on board the gunboats, or in fishing, or in the navigation of the inland waters, without losing any claim to land or other advantages derived from this system. But no one, unless an actual settler as above defined, or unless absent on Government service, will be entitled to claim any right to land or property in any settlement by virtue of these orders.

V. In order to carry out this system of settlement a general officer will be detailed as inspector of settlements and plantations, whose duty it shall be to visit the settlements, to regulate their police and general management, and who will furnish personally to each head of a family, subject to the approval of the President of the United States, a possessory title in writing, giving as near as possible the description of boundaries, and who shall adjust all claims or conflicts that may arise under the same, subject to the like approval, treating such titles altogether as possessory. The same general officer will also be charged with the enlistment and organization of the negro recruits and protecting their interests while absent from their settlements, and will be governed by the rules and regulations prescribed by the War Department for such purpose.

VI. Brig. Gen. R. Saxton is hereby appointed inspector of settlements and plantations and will at once enter on the performance of his duties. No change is intended or desired in the settlement now on Beaufort Island, nor will any rights to property heretofore acquired be affected thereby.

By order of Maj. Gen. W. T. Sherman:

L. N. DAYTON, Assistant Adjutant-General.

— William T. Sherman, Military Division of the Mississippi; 1865 series - Special Field Order 15, January 16, 1865.

=== Publication in the Official Record ===
This order is part of the Official Records of the American Civil War. It can be found in Series I – Military Operations, Volume XLVII, Part II, Pages 60–62. The volume was published in 1895.

== Legacy ==
According to Henry Louis Gates Jr.:

The promise was the first systematic attempt to provide a form of reparations to newly freed slaves, and it was astonishingly radical for its time, proto-socialist in its implications. In fact, such a policy would be radical in any country today: the federal government's massive confiscation of private property – some 400,000 acres – formerly owned by Confederate land owners, and its methodical redistribution to former black slaves.

According to historian John David Smith:

"What does this history teach us? Yes, the historical record disproves assertions that the federal government reneged on promises to grant the freedpeople "forty acres and a mule." But the fact that the government never made such a promise in the first place tells us something about how black people were treated in 19th-century America. Moreover, it is important to remember that the freedpeople desperately wanted land, believed that they had been deceived, and felt betrayed. The legacy of that sense of betrayal lingers on. After 138 years, the stubborn myth of "forty acres and a mule" remains a political football and a sober reminder of the ex-slaves' broken hopes and shattered dreams.

By the 1870s, blacks had abandoned hope of federal land redistribution, but many still saw "forty acres and a mule" as the key to freedom. Black land ownership in the South increased steadily despite the failure of federal Reconstruction. One quarter of black farmers in the South owned their land by 1900. Near the coast, they owned an average of 27 acres; inland, an average of 48 acres. By comparison, 63% of Southern white farmers owned their land. Most of this land was simply bought through private transactions.

In 1910, black Americans owned 15,000,000 acres of land, most of it in Alabama, Mississippi, North Carolina, and South Carolina. This figure has since declined to 5,500,000 acres in 1980 and to 2,000,000 acres in 1997. Most of this land is not the area held by black families in 1910; beyond the "Black Belt", it is located in Texas, Oklahoma, and California. The total number of Black farmers has decreased from 925,708 in 1920 to 18,000 in 1997; the number of white farmers has also decreased, but much more slowly. Black American land ownership has diminished more than that of any other ethnic group, while white land ownership has increased. Black families who inherit land across generations without obtaining an explicit title (often resulting in tenancy in common by multiple descendants) may have difficulty gaining government benefits and risk losing their land completely. Outright fraud and lynchings have also been used to strip black people of their land.

Black landowners are common targets of eminent domain laws invoked to make way for public works projects. At Harris Neck in the Sea Islands, a group of Gullah freedpeople retained 2,681 acres of high-quality land due to the Will of the plantation owner Marg[a]ret Ann Harris. About 100 black farmers continued to live at Harris Neck until 1942, when they were forced off the land because of a plan to build an Air Force base. The land was used freely by local white authorities until 1962, when it was turned over to the federal Fish and Wildlife Service and became Harris Neck National Wildlife Refuge. Ownership of the land remains contested.

The United States Department of Agriculture (USDA) has long been viewed as a cause for the decline in black agriculture. According to a 1997 report by the USDA's own Civil Rights Action Team:

There are some who call the USDA 'the last plantation.' An 'old line' department, USDA was one of the last federal agencies to integrate and perhaps the last to include women and minorities in leadership positions. Considered a stubborn bureaucracy and slow to change, USDA is also perceived as playing a key role in what some see as a conspiracy to force minority and socially disadvantaged farmers off their land through discriminatory loan practices.

A class action lawsuit has accused the USDA of systematic discrimination against black farmers from 1981 to 1999. In Pigford v. Glickman (1999), District Court Judge Paul L. Friedman ruled in favor of the farmers and ordered the USDA to pay financial damages for loss of land and revenue. However, the status of full compensation for affected farmers remains unresolved.

=== Symbolism ===
The phrase "40 acres and a mule" has come to symbolize the broken promise that Reconstruction policies would offer economic justice for African Americans.

The "40 acres and a mule" promise featured prominently in the class action racial discrimination lawsuit of Pigford v. Glickman. In his opinion, federal judge Paul L. Friedman ruled that the United States Department of Agriculture had discriminated against African American farmers and wrote: "Forty acres and a mule. The government broke that promise to African American farmers. Over one hundred years later, the USDA broke its promise to Mr. James Beverly."

In 1989, the U.S. congressional representative for Michigan John Conyers introduced a bill entitled Commission to Study Reparation Proposals for African Americans Act. The bill was later numbered H.R. 40 as an allusion to the promise.

=== Reparations ===
"40 acres and a mule" is often discussed in the context of reparations for slavery. However, strictly speaking, the various policies offering "forty acres" provided land for political and economic reasons—and with a price tag—and not as unconditional compensation for lifetimes of unpaid labor.

=== Memorials ===
A historical marker commemorating the order was erected by the Georgia Historical Society in Savannah, near the corner of Harris and Bull streets, in Madison Square.

=== Popular culture ===
The phrase is heard in the 1939 film Gone with the Wind, during a brief scene in which a politician promises forty acres and a mule to a group of freedmen in exchange for their votes.

== See also ==
- American Civil War
- Forty Acres and a Mule Filmworks
- Three acres and a cow, a land reform slogan in Britain.
- Black land loss in the United States
- African-American history of agriculture in the United States
- Jim Crow economy
