= Black land loss in the United States =

Black land loss in the United States refers to the loss of land ownership and rights by Black people residing or farming in the United States. In 1862, the United States government passed the Homestead Act. This Act gave certain Americans seeking farmland the right to apply for ownership of government land or the public domain. This newly acquired farmland was typically called a homestead. In all, more than 160 million acres (650,000 km^{2}; 250,000 mi^{2}) of public land, or nearly 10 percent of the total area of the United States was given away free to 1.6 million homesteaders. However, until the United States abolished slavery in 1865 and the passage of the 14th amendment in 1868, enslaved and free Black people could not benefit from these acts. According to data published by the National Park Service and the University of Nebraska, some 6000 homesteads of an average of 160 acres (65 ha; 0.25 mi^{2}) were issued to Black people in the years immediately following the war.

At about the same time, as Black Americans began seeking out land of their own, Special Field Orders No. 15 was issued through the Savannah Colloquy. The order issued freed black people 40 acres of land that lay on the coastline of Georgia and South Carolina. In addition, the mules that had been used in the war and were now idle were expected to be offered to these black Americans for use in farming, leading to the phrase "forty acres and a mule". The Freedmen's Bureau was created by the government and President Abraham Lincoln in 1865 to deal with the issue of the freed black people and their settlement in the abandoned land. Sherman's Land was a Field Order that gave a significant number of freed black people the opportunity to settle on land in Georgia and South Carolina. There were around 40,000 of these freed black people who settled in over 400,000 acres of land. However, it later turned out these lands belonged to rice plantation farmers. According to Linda Faye Williams, it also turned out that while the Freedman's Bureau had the potential to help freed slaves get on their feet, ultimately all of the land that was supposed to be distributed amongst the freed black people was given back to confederate planters who previously owned it, by Pres. Andrew Johnson, who overturned the Field Order.

== Causes of land loss ==
1865 marked the abolition of slavery with the creation of the 13th Amendment and although many people were now free they were still being restricted in some ways. Common issues causing land loss among freed slaves and their descendants included a lack of necessary paperwork and documents. The lack of or inability to produce these items resulted in unequal access to programs and services that would have assisted them with both obtaining land and ensuring that it remained within the family. Many newly freed slaves lacked necessary documents such as birth certificates that would prove their identity. They were able to obtain citizenship documentation after being freed, as they were required to register for citizenship. This documentation was not seen as proof of identity, however, and many freed slaves were given the same last names as their owners.

Another issue was that many freed slaves and their earlier descendants rarely had access to legal services which meant they couldn't write wills that would correctly pass down landownership and the proper titles. If land was not explicitly passed down to a certain person or group of people, the property would go to all of the next heirs, who would have the ability to sell their piece of land without informing the others.

In the years following 1865, newly freed slaves experienced difficulty acquiring land because there was a lack of documents that proved their identity. This was one of the ways that white people were able to restrict the freedmen from acquiring status.

== Civil War ==
In the year 1862, the U.S. Department of Agriculture was created. At this time the legal administration still heavily favored white Americans despite the ongoing Civil War and the slavery of the black people. During the same year the U.S Congress passed the Morill Act of 1862. Also referred to as the land Grant Act, the Morill Act of 1862 was meant to offer land grants to whites-only colleges that taught agriculture and mechanical courses. In addition, Congress also passed the Homestead Act of 1862, which legalized the acquisition of land in the West. The legalization came with the offer of subsidies to facilitate the acquisition and use of the land. However, these benefits were reserved for whites only; black Americans were not able to enjoy their rights to land nor government support.

== Post Civil War ==
When slavery was abolished in 1865, black Americans started to demand American land. One of the responses offered to their demand was Field Order 15 issued through what is famously referred to as the Savannah Colloquy. The order gave roughly 400,000 acres of land that lay on the coastline of Georgia and South Carolina to freed slaves. In addition, the mules that had been used in the war and were now idle were to be offered to these black Americans for use in farming.

To help freed slaves deal with starvation, housing issues and medical aid, Congress created the Freedmen's Bureau in 1865. A significant number of freed slaves were settled in Georgia and South Carolina. Approximately 40,000 freed slaves were settled in over 400,000 acres of land, but their claims were contested by rice plantation farmers who claimed to own the land. After Lincoln's assassination in April 1865 the Presidency was assumed by Vice-president Andrew Johnson, who overturned Special Field Orders No. 15. The new presidential order required black landowners to return the land to the white rice plantation farmers, a move that was vehemently opposed by the black landowners.

When black Americans finally gained citizenship in 1866, Congress passed the Southern Homestead Act. This Act was meant to avail land in states such as Alabama, Arkansas, Florida, Louisiana, Texas, and Mississippi to acquisition by the people, which included the black population. At the core of Act was the endeavor to give black Americans the chance to buy land in these states, of which black Americans took advantage. Though black Americans' right to land was improving, their political and social rights, among others, were declining at a worrying pace, especially in the South.

The Federation of Southern Cooperatives was created in 1867 and was intended to offer financial assistance to black farmers to assist in their quest to acquire land and to improve their agricultural practices. A second Morill Act was passed in 1890 and gave blacks grants to colleges to learn arts and agricultural courses. In line with this, black Americans formed the first cooperative union in Arkansas and the United States in order to fight for and protect their rights.

The rest of these eras is characterized by the Jim Crow policies that had been legalized by the Supreme Court under the Plessy v. Ferguson 1896 decision that allowed "separate but equal" treatment of whites and blacks.

For a period after the Civil War, black ownership of land increased and was primarily used for farming. At one point blacks had gained ownership over about 15 million acres, which meant that they were also in control of 14% of the farms located in the United States (that is 925,000 farms owned by black people). Leah Douglas observes that this number is drastically different from 20th century figures; in the 20th century black people not only owned far less land in general but also owned only 2% of the farms located in the US.

== 1900s ==
By 1910 records showed that more black Americans owned land than ever before in the history of the United States. Over 14 million acres of land were owned by approximately 210,000 black persons, leading some historians to refer to this time period as the height of black land ownership. Since then, however, black land ownership has been on a steady decline. In a bid to address this worsening issue Congress came up with the Farmers Home Administration, which was intended to extend credit to small income farmers, particularly black Americans. With the establishment of political rights for all black Americans, rights to land in the southern states began improving.

Despite these efforts black ownership of land continued to decline and many black Americans were still experiencing land loss. In 1969 James Forman began a very long campaign dubbed the 'Black Manifesto', which called for reparations to be paid to black Americans as well as a land bank in the south meant to offer financial assistance for those experiencing land loss. This call was later followed up by the 1973 'Only Six Million Acres' campaign led by Robert S. Browne. This campaign led to the creation of the Emergency Land Fund during that same year. Also founded by Browne, this fund was intended to address the loss of land by the black population.

Using government grants, the Emergency Land Fund conducted research to determine why black Americans were losing land at an alarming rate. It found that the primary reason for the land loss was the heir property policy and that family owned land was easily lost in loans and other encumbrances. Further research has suggested that additional reasons for black land loss was discrimination by the Department of Agriculture and discriminatory policies put in place by the Farmers Home Administration.

Eventually, the Emergency Land Fund merged with other federations with similar goals and in 1990 they petitioned for the passage of laws to offer assistance to black farmers. During the same year a lawsuit was filed that sought redress for the plight of black farmers. Despite these actions and awareness campaigns such as the 1992 Caravan to Washington March, black land loss continued. In 1997 the Department of Agriculture responded by holding talks with farmers and by coming up with 92 ideals that were intended to defeat discrimination. Another lawsuit was filed based on the black farmers' plight, prompting the Department of Agriculture to agree to offer a class payment in 1999.

== 2000s ==
In 2002, a USDA Report showed that black people owned less than 1% of the rural land in the United States and the total value of all of that land together is only 14 billion dollars, out of a total land value of more than 1.2 trillion dollars, while the total land that white people owned 96% of rural land, bringing their land's joint worth to just over one trillion dollars.

Black American farmers are more likely to rent rather than own the land on which they live, which in turn made them less likely to be able to afford to buy land later.

In the year 2010, President Barack Obama authorized the payment of 1.25 billion dollars from the USDA to black American farmers as a settlement in Pigford v. Glickman.

Even after the Pigford settlement black land loss remained prevalent. Organizations founded to help people maintain ownership of their land include the Federation of Southern Cooperatives, whose Land Assistance fund provides grants to African American families in need, primarily to Southern farmers (whose land ownership is also decreasing).

== Black land loss' impact on the present ==
Land ownership is important because it is a type of wealth that people can establish and benefit from themselves but also pass down (if properly maintained) for generations. During slavery, black people were denied ownership of themselves let alone land and after slavery ended laws were set in place to ensure that this remained the same. The large migration of black workers from the South to the North after globalization and technological advancements replaced the need for a lot of manual labor, created such a large population of black people in the North that people in power initiated redlining. Redlining prevented black people from living in certain areas (both because real estate agents would only show them houses in black-designated areas and because banks would deny blacks the loans necessary to buy a house in white-designated areas).

Since redlining limited blacks to certain areas, not only did overcrowding become an issue, but there were fewer options for owning land (let alone space enough to establish farms). Land ownership is one of the easier ways to establish wealth, but black people were denied this option for so long that now it is one of the only forms of wealth they have.

== See also ==
- African-American history of agriculture in the United States
- Jim Crow economy
