= 1891 Arkansas cotton pickers' strike =

Labor action of African-American sharecroppers in Arkansas

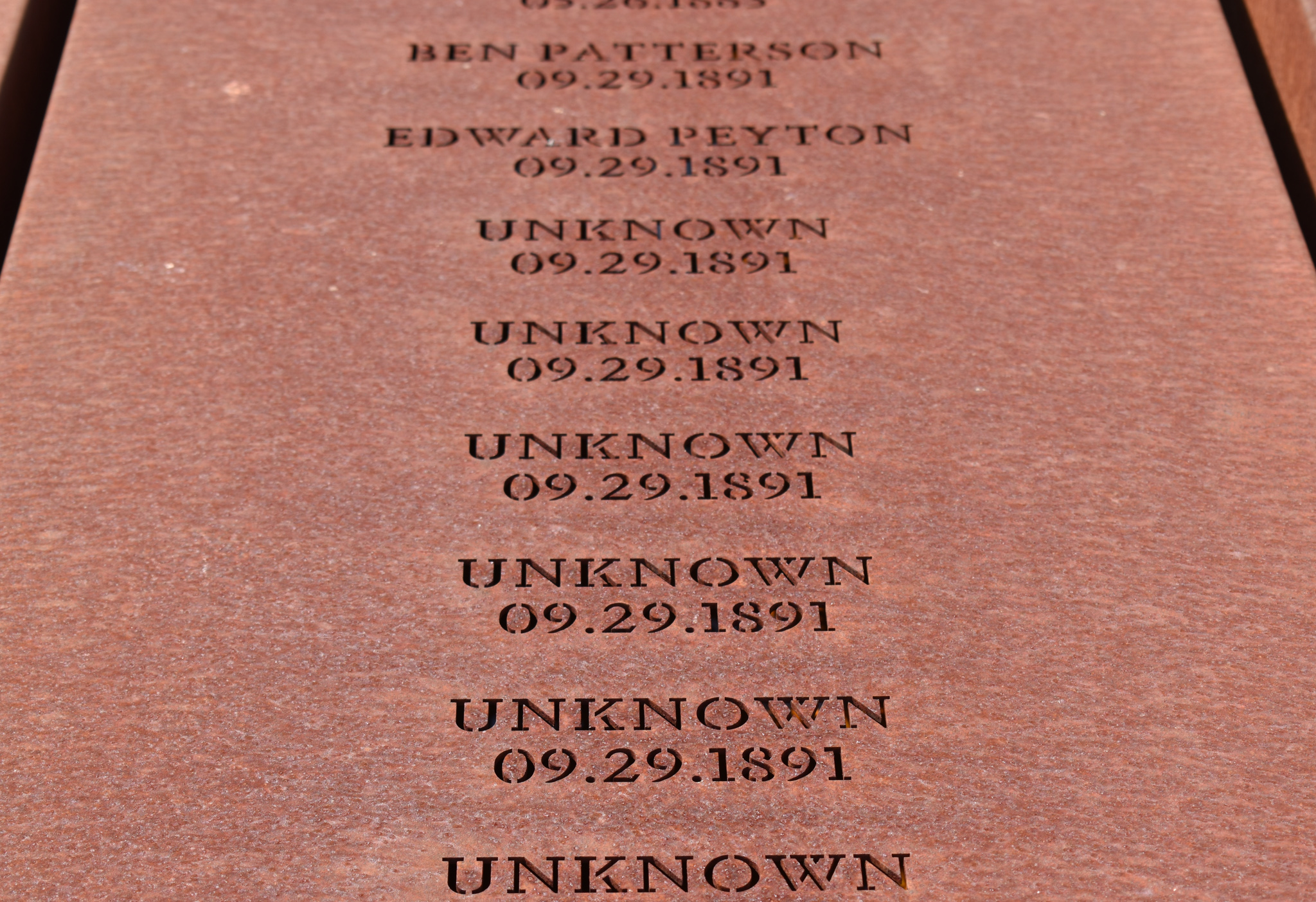
Monument at the National Memorial for Peace and Justice memorializing the Black individuals lynched following the strike.

The cotton pickers' strike of 1891 was a labor action of African-American sharecroppers in Lee County, Arkansas in September 1891. The strike led to open conflict between strikers and plantation owners, racially motivated violence, and both a sheriff's posse and a lynching party. One plantation manager, two non-striking workers, and some twelve strikers were killed during the incident. Nine of those strikers were hanged in a mass lynching on the evening of September 29.

== Background ==
In 1886 the Colored Farmers' National Alliance and Cooperative Union had been founded by R.M. Humphrey, a white Baptist minister, reformer, and member of the parallel white Farmers' Alliance organization. Early in September 1891, Humphrey called for a national African-American strike of sharecroppers against planters, in response to the planters setting 50-cent-per-100-pound prices at their summer conventions.

Despite its extensive claimed membership of millions, and despite Humphrey's announcement of 600,000 members firmly committed to strike for $1 per 100 pounds, the strike promoted for September 12 took hold nowhere. Additionally, many landowners who became aware of the planned strike took steps to suppress or outright prevent the strike through increased police presence and pacification tactics such as smaller raises. Its failure was noted and documented with some satisfaction in newspapers across the cotton-growing south. The one exception was in Lee County, a location with its own history of conflict, on the Mississippi River and across from Memphis, Tennessee. Ben Patterson, a Black labor organizer from Memphis, traveled to Lee County at the beginning of September 1891 and began to organize a strike among local cotton pickers. Patterson's efforts were significantly more successful than those of Humphrey, garnering the support of at least twenty-five pickers in Lee County.

== The strike ==
Workers for planter Colonel H.P. Rodgers struck on September 20, demanding higher wages, and began traveling through the county looking for support. These workers were from Memphis, led by a Ben Patterson. Among other workers in the county they found no support. A brawl between striking and non-striking workers killed two on September 25. On the 28th the strikers killed a notorious plantation manager named Miller and burned a cotton gin.

A posse, with some black members, was organized under Sheriff Derrick of Marianna to track down the remaining strikers and Patterson, partly on the grounds that Miller the plantation manager had been deputized. On September 29 the search led north to an island near Horseshoe Lake in Crittenden County. The strikers had been trying to work north, back to President's Island and then to Memphis. In an open battle the posse killed two strikers and captured nine. At more or less the same time, Patterson alone escaped to the steamboat James Lee and admitted his story, but was extracted from the boat, taken ashore, and shot. The nine prisoners under guard by the sheriff's men were intercepted on the road by a masked lynching party, greatly outnumbering them, that took the prisoners and hanged them one by one.

The Arkansas Gazette ran coverage under the title "Lee County Trouble Settled with Rope". The incident directly led to the collapse of the Colored Farmers' Alliance.

== See also ==
- List of massacres in the United States
- List of worker deaths in United States labor disputes
