= Agriculture in the Southwestern United States =

Agriculture in the Southwest United States is very important economically.

== Watershed ==
The three main watersheds of the southwest United States are the Colorado River Basin, the Great Basin, and the Rio Grande Basin. The Colorado River Basin includes parts of California, Utah, Arizona, New Mexico, Colorado, and Wyoming. The Colorado River is the largest river in the Southwest United States. The Great Basin watershed includes parts of southern California, most of Utah, the northwest half of Nevada, and parts of Oregon and Idaho. The Rio Grande Basin includes most of New Mexico, some of western Texas, and a small portion of Colorado.

Almost all of Arizona drains into the Colorado River. Most of New Mexico drains into either the Rio Grande or the Pecos River, its tributary. Other watersheds of New Mexico include the Canadian River in the northeast, the San Juan in the Northwest, and the Gila (tributary of Colorado River) in the southwest.

== Native vegetation ==
=== New Mexico ===
New Mexico's mountain ranges support a wide variety of plant life. In the Rocky Mountains, the slopes have forests of Douglas fir, ponderosa pine, and aspen trees at lower elevations. At higher elevations, the forests include Engelmann spruce, firs, Rocky Mountain white pine, and various aspens. Above the timberline of the mountains is alpine tundra. Most other mountain ranges in New Mexico predominantly include ponderosa pine and Douglas firs, yuccas, cacti, and creosote bushes.

=== Arizona ===
On the mountain slopes of Arizona, there are forests of Ponderosa pine, firs, and other evergreen trees. These trees, especially the Ponderosa pine, are the main source of Arizona's commercial timber. At lower elevations, the main natural trees are the pinyon, juniper, and oak.

=== Nevada ===
Nevada has vegetation similar to New Mexico and Arizona in many ways. Desert shrub ecosystems, of which sagebrush makes a huge part, cover nearly 55 million acres of the land. About 14 percent (or 9.2 million acres) of Nevada lies in Pinyon-Juniper forests, and the mountainous regions are covered with coniferous or alpine trees, depending on the altitude.

== History of agriculture ==
Native Americans have been in the Southwest United States for at least 12,000 years. Although the agricultural practices of ancient Native Americans is largely unknown in the area, it is known that agriculture was widespread by the arrival of the Pueblos by 100 BC at the latest. The Pueblos relied heavily on hunting and fishing for sustenance at first, only growing pumpkins and corn. They stored their food in pits, and lived in either caves or huts made out of wooden poles and clay.

Around 500 CE, the Pueblos began growing beans and domesticated the turkey and duck. It was around this time that agriculture became as important a part of survival as hunting and fishing, because they had a slightly more diverse agricultural diet. Once agriculture became more prevalent and useful, the Pueblos began to group together in larger numbers, forming groups of many connected houses, with basements full of stored food.

Between 1000 and 1500 CE, Native American agriculture expanded greatly. Around this time, the Navajos and Apaches became the largest population in the area. They began to grow cotton, melons, squash, and chili peppers in addition to corn, beans, and pumpkins.

The Native Americans in the Southwest used the most advanced agricultural techniques available at the time. They frequently employed the use of irrigation, crop rotation, and windbreaks to maximize their crop yield. These techniques were presumably borrowed from the people of Mexico and the Andes in the south. When the Spaniards arrived in North America in the 1500s, they brought bananas, wheat, sheep, and cows. All of these were incorporated into the diet of many Native American tribes of the Southwest.

== Modern agriculture ==
Most of the Colorado River basin water used by humans is used to grow feed for livestock—more than four times the amount used for crops for direct human consumption.

The Southwest United States is so dry and hot and the soil is inadequate compared to places like the Great Plains in the Midwest, much of the Southwest is used for grazing livestock. Almost 60 percent of the land in Nevada is used for livestock grazing, and at least 35 percent in New Mexico and Arizona. Nevada has the smallest amount of land used for crop production, while New Mexico has the most.

Crop production plays a large part in the economy. Much of the land designated as cattle grazing land is also used to grow alfalfa hay. This is used to feed livestock, so cattle and sheep farmers tend to grow it to feed their animals, and sell it when they are in excess.

=== Livestock ===
In New Mexico, as in Arizona and Nevada, livestock is the principal economic generator in their agricultural industry. In 2007, the state produced over $3.0 billion worth of cattle and sheep. Of that, $1.3 billion was from the dairy industry, while $951 million was from the beef industry. That year, there were 1.5 million cattle and 130,000 sheep in the state.

Arizona's livestock industry comprises over one third of its $2.4 billion annual industry. Nevada's main agricultural output is also beef, followed by hay and dairy products.

=== Crops ===
Most of the cropland in the Southwest United States is used to grow hay. In New Mexico, 1.55 million tons of hay were grown in 2007. In Nevada, over 90 percent of the cropland is used to grow hay. Alfalfa hay is also the number one crop of Arizona. In 2008, Arizona's hay crop sold for $288 million.

Arizona's crops, excluding hay, make about $1.9 billion per year. Cotton, lettuce, and wheat are the largest contributors in terms of money, but they also produce a significant amount of potatoes, lemons, tangerines, and cantaloupes. Over 49,000 dry tons of chili peppers were grown in New Mexico in 2007, 35 million pounds of peanuts were grown, and 63,000 acres were used for onion production. New Mexico is also a significant producer of pinto beans and grapes. Since Nevada uses 90 percent of its cropland to grow hay, it is not a major contributor to other crops. Nevada does grow potatoes, wheat, barley, and onions, as the rest of the southwest states do. They also grow mint and garlic.

Arizona Extension recommends cultivars for tree crops in the Low Desert region, including a few which have been tested and proven viable:

- Apples: Anna, Beverly Hills, Ein shemer, Golden Dorsett, Gordon.
- Apricot: Katy, Patterson.
- Fig: Black Mission, Brown Turkey, White Conadria, White Kadota.
- Peaches: Bonanza Miniature, Babcock, Desert Gold, Desert Red, Earligrande, Flordaprince, Tropic Beauty, Tropic Snow, Tropic Sweet.
- Plums: Gulf Gold, Gulf Ruby, Santa Rosa.
- Almonds: All-in-One, Garden Prince Genetic Dwarf.
- Pecans: Neplus Ultra, Cheyenne, Choctaw, Comanche, Sioux, Western Schley, Wichita.
- Grapes: Cardinal, Exotic, Fantasy, Flame seedless, Perlette, Ruby seedless, Thompson seedless.
- Blackberries: Brazos, Rosborough.
- Strawberries: Camerosa, Chandler, Sequoia, Tioga.

=== Agricultural practices ===
The Southwest employs the heaviest irrigation of any region, since the region is hot and dry, and the soil is generally not as conducive to plant growth as other areas of the country. Despite this, the Southwestern United States suffers from water shortages and droughts despite the already employed irrigation systems.

=== Environmental impact ===
It has been estimated that livestock, namely cattle, make up about 16 percent of human-caused carbon dioxide emissions. Also, although cropland takes up a small portion of land, irrigation for crops accounts for 80 percent of water consumption in the Southwest. A lot of this water is coming from the Colorado River, which is already almost completely used up by the time the water reaches Mexico. About half of irrigation water comes from groundwater in the Southwest, and this is also being used much faster than it is being replenished. If climate change raises the temperatures in the Southwest, then this will increase the amount of water that evaporates from the soil, plants, and bodies of water. Since the 1970s more water has been evaporated from reservoirs than is used by humans.
