= Caesar Tarrant =

American pilot in the Revolutionary War

Caesar Tarrant (Note: Sometimes spelled "Cesar" or "Terrant") (c. 1740–1797) was an American boat pilot who served as a patriot in the American Revolutionary War. Born enslaved, Tarrant's skill as a pilot aboard the Patriot led to his manumission by the state after the war.

== Early life ==
Tarrant was from Hampton, Virginia, home to many river boat pilots. Though enslaved, by the time he was a young adult he had learned how to pilot vessels through the nearby riverways. He was sold once after gaining this skill and it increased his sale price. He married Lucy, a woman enslaved by a different owner, and they had three children.

== Revolutionary War ==
Lord Dunmore, governor of the Colony of Virginia, responded in 1775 to early revolutionary actions by recruiting Virginians to strike back. He issued Dunmore's Proclamation, offering freedom to any enslaved people who fought for the crown. Hundreds signed up to fight with him, but Tarrant decided instead to fight for the patriots.

The Virginia Navy hired Tarrant as a pilot, placing him on several vessels during the war. While serving on the Patriot in 1778, Tarrant participated in a battle at the Virginia Capes, a high priority area for the navy. Tarrant out-maneuvered and rammed the Lord Howe, a British privateer vessel. Both sides took injuries and the British ship escaped, but Tarrant garnered praise from his captain, who said he "behaved gallantly".

== After the war ==
Having served in the state navy for three years, (Note: Historian Luther Porter Jackson writes that Tarrant "was a pilot for four years", but he later refers to Tarrant's daughter seeking a land grant bounty for her father's "three years' services".) Tarrant returned home to Hampton. The state and fledgling United States governments had not promised freedom to slaves fighting on the patriots' side. Tarrant remained enslaved and was passed on to his owner's daughter after his death in 1784.

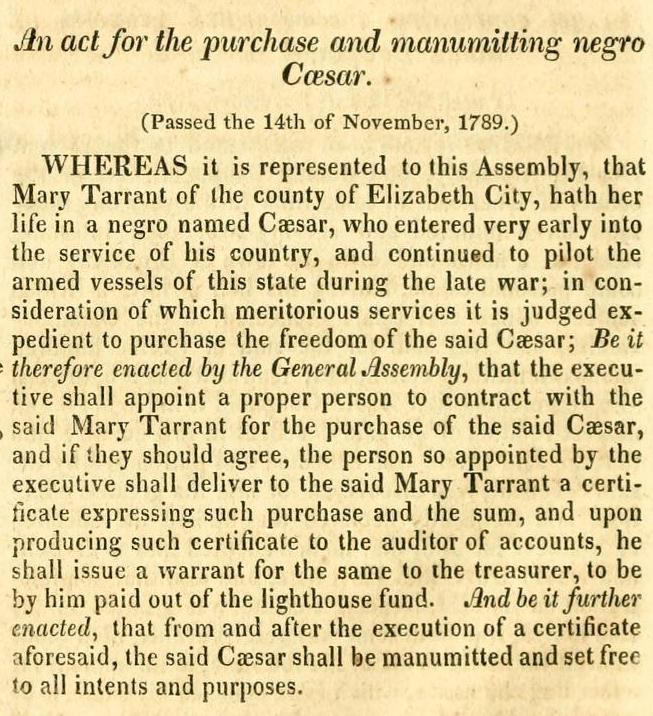
The 1789 Virginia General Assembly statute that freed Tarrant from slavery

In 1789, the Virginia General Assembly directed the executive branch to purchase Tarrant and manumit him. The purchase was concluded that year, and the newly-free Tarrant began freeing the rest of his family.

== Legacy ==
In his will, written in 1796, Tarrant willed his property in Hampton to his wife, with half to go to their daughter Nancy upon Lucy's death. His son Sampson also inherited some property. Lucy sold part of the estate to free their daughter Lidy from slavery. (Note: His daughter's name is sometimes spelled "Lydia". (Hucles 2000))

Two schools in Hampton were named after Tarrant. Cesar Tarrant Elementary closed in 2015. Cesar Tarrant Middle School was renamed from Jefferson Davis Middle School in 2018, with support for the renaming increasing in part due to backlash against the 2017 Unite the Right rally in Charlottesville, Virginia.
