= Colored Farmers' National Alliance and Cooperative Union =

Texas agricultural cooperative

The Colored Farmers' National Alliance and Cooperative Union was formed in 1886 in Texas. Despite the fact that both black and white farmers faced great difficulties due to the rising price of farming and the decreasing profits which were coming from farming, the protective organization known as the Southern Farmers' Alliance did not allow black farmers to join. Nor did the National Grange, centered in the Midwest. A group of black farmers decided to organize their own alliance, to fill their needs. The organization rapidly spread across the Southern United States, peaking with a membership of 1.2 million in 1891.

== Organizational history ==
=== Origins ===
The Farmers' Alliance was founded in central Texas in 1876, through the efforts of farmers at self-protection from 'land sharks,' merchants, horse thieves, and cattle ranchers. The constitution of the initial Texas order, drafted in 1882, denied membership to blacks on the grounds that the Alliance was a social organization "where we meet with our wives and daughters." But, leaders of the Alliance realized that it was impossible to establish a profitable agricultural system while a large black population served as potential competitors and a source of cheap, exploitable labor.

The Colored Farmers National Alliance and Cooperative Union was founded in Houston County, Texas on December 11, 1886, on the farm of R.M. Humphrey, a white Alliance member and Baptist missionary. The alliance elected J. J. Shuffer as its first president. Although the orders' charter barred whites from membership, Humphrey was elected honorary superintendent. As increasingly repressive Black Codes were enacted, Humphrey served as a "white spokesman who could openly express militancy and have access that would be denied to blacks." By 1888 the alliance received a charter from the US Federal Government. They quickly after began to spread and found chapters in different states across the South. In 1890 they merged with a rival alliance, the National Colored Alliance. They also absorbed the Colored Agricultural Wheels in Arkansas, western Tennessee and Alabama. By 1890, the Colored Farmers' Alliance claimed over 1,200,000 members.

The order’s statement of principles was in the vein of Booker T. Washington, promoting economic self-sufficiency and racial ‘uplift’ through vocational training, at the expense of demands for political equality. They tried to educate the farmers about better farming tactics and techniques, and set up exchanges in the ports of Norfolk, Charleston, Mobile, New Orleans and Houston, where members could go in order to purchase discounted items required for their farming. They advocated members' avoiding debt through hard work and sacrifice, and suggested goals such as home ownership. They collaborated with the white Farmers' Alliance in opposing the Louisiana State Lottery Company and efforts to tax the production of cottonseed oil, an extremely valuable crop for black tenant farmers.

However, the two alliances split in 1890 over a Federal Elections Bill introduced in the House of Representatives by Rep. Henry Cabot Lodge, which authorized federal supervision of voter registration and voting. It was designed to end the suppression of Southern Republican votes, particularly black votes, which had been under considerable pressure by the Democratic state legislatures. Virtually all white Southerners, including the Farmers' Alliance, denounced the bill as a return to the policies of Reconstruction, and the Democrats succeeded in making it the central issue of the 1892 Presidential election in the South. Humphrey sought to downplay the issue, insisting that black suffrage would be protected through the Alliance movement. The majority of black Populists supported renewed federal intervention to preserve their civil rights, which were being eroded by state changes to voter registration and electoral laws.

=== Demise ===
In 1891, after the split over the elections bill, the Colored Alliance called a general strike of black cotton-pickers to demand a wage increase from 50 cents to $1 per hundred pounds of cotton. The white Farmers' Alliance, whose membership in the South included large numbers of landowners employing sharecroppers, were the most vehement opponents of the proposed strike. The Progressive Farmer, paper of Farmers Alliance President Leonidas L. Polk, urged “our farmers to leave their cotton in the field rather than pay more than 50 cents per hundred to have it picked.”

The leadership of the Colored Alliance lacked the resources to mobilize the vast majority of sharecroppers who were illiterate or semi-literate and lacked alternative sources of income. The Georgia chapter of the Colored Alliance, with a large contingent of landowners, refused to support the strike, viewing it as detrimental to the interests of black farmers who owned or rented their land. A minor cotton pickers strike of 1891 in the Arkansas Delta in September was crushed by local vigilantes, resulting in the death of fifteen strikers, including several who were lynched.

By the end of 1891, with the failure of the cotton-pickers strike, the Colored Farmers' Alliance began to decline in both membership and political influence. The Texas branch continued to be active by the spring of 1892. Alex Asberry, a black Republican state legislator from Robertson County, was elected state president and founded a newspaper, the Alliance Vindicator. But, by the end of 1892 the Texas Colored Farmers' Alliance had largely disappeared. And by extension, the National Colored Farmers' Alliance disappeared after 1896 with the demise of the Populist Party, from where its members were generally recruited.

=== Colored Alliance and the Populist Party ===
At the 1892 St. Louis convention of the Southern and Northern Farmers' Alliances, Humphrey secured the vote of the Colored Farmers' Alliance for the creation of an independent third-party, helping override considerable opposition from the white Southern Alliance delegates. He packed the Colored Farmers' Alliance delegation with pro-third party white men in a series of proxy deals that were contrary to the organization's charter. The black delegates from Georgia Colored Farmers' Alliance, whose leadership opposed the formation of a third party, walked out of the convention in protest over this action. Only four black delegates were in attendance at the founding convention of the People's Party on the 4th of July in Omaha.

The Populists hoped to bypass black Republican politicians, who they viewed as corrupt, by directly appealing to black farmers via the Colored Alliance. However, the Colored Alliance was in rapid decline and black Republican politicians and newspapers were largely critical of the Southern Populists, whose claims of support for black civil rights were largely rhetorical and disingenuous.

In most Southern states, the stronghold of Populism was in the old yeoman-dominated hill-country white belt regions, whose inhabitants played a leading role in the rebellions against Reconstruction, only to be marginalized by the old black belt planters allied with Northern capital and corporate interests, especially the railroads. The Populists opposed the convict lease system and denounced Democratic reliance on threats of 'Negro domination.' At the same time, they steadfastly maintained that they did not support 'social equality' between the races and often sought to counter allegations that they compromised white racial solidarity by insisting that they were the true party of white supremacy.

A number of Southern Populists sought to rid the South of blacks by promoting emigration, either to Africa or to the West. Polk formulated a plan to create a separate all-black state in the West, preferably Texas. Populist Congressman Tom Watson of Georgia is often cited as the main example of the initial racial liberalism of Southern Populism, acknowledging blacks as an integral part of Southern economy and society. However, he had an antagonistic relationship with the leadership of the states' Colored Alliance, and, after being defeated through Bourbon Democrat manipulation of the black vote, gradually became an advocate of black disenfranchisement.

== See also ==
- Farmers' Alliance
