= Freedmen's Bureau bills =

U.S. Reconstruction-era legislation

- Long title: An Act to establish a Bureau for the Relief of Freedmen and Refugees (1865); An Act to continue in force and to amend "An Act to establish a Bureau for the Relief of Freedmen and Refugees," and for other purposes (1866)
- Enacted by: the 38th United States Congress
- Effective: March 3, 1865 (Original Act)

Citations
- Statutes at Large: 13 Stat. 507 (1865 Act); 14 Stat. 173 (1866 Act)

Legislative history
- Introduced in the House as H.R. 51 (1865); H.R. 613 (1866) by Thomas D. Eliot on December 14, 1863 (1865 Act); Committee consideration by Committee on Emancipation; Passed the House on February 9, 1865 (1865 Act agreement); Passed the Senate on February 22, 1865 (1865 Act agreement); Signed into law by President Abraham Lincoln (1865 Act) on March 3, 1865 (1865 Act); Vetoed by President Andrew Johnson (1866 Act) on July 16, 1866 (1866 Act veto); Overridden by the House on July 16, 1866 (1866 Act override) (104–33); Overridden by the Senate and became law on July 16, 1866 (1866 Act override) (33–12)

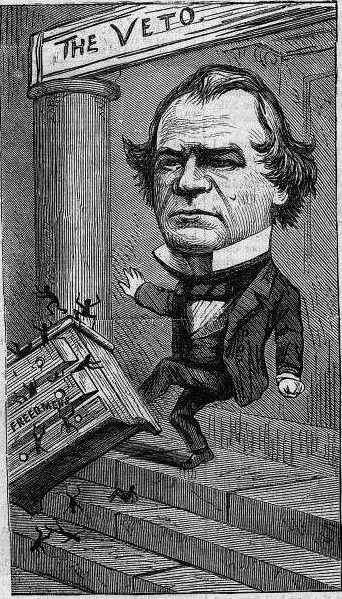
Andrew Johnson vetoed a bill extending funding for the Freedmen's Bureau (editorial cartoon by Thomas Nast, Harper's Weekly, April 14, 1866)

The Freedmen's Bureau bills provided legislative authorization for the Freedmen's Bureau (formally known as the Bureau of Refugees, Freedmen and Abandoned Lands), which was set up by U.S. President Abraham Lincoln in 1865 as part of the United States Army. Following the original bill in 1865, subsequent bills sought to extend its authority and lifespan. Andrew Johnson tried to derail the bill's intention to aid freed slaves during his presidency.

By 1869 Southern Democrats in Congress had deprived the Bureau of most of its funding, and as a result it had to cut much of its staff. By 1870 the Bureau had been weakened further due to the rise of Ku Klux Klan (KKK) violence across the South; members of the KKK and other terrorist organizations, attacked both blacks and sympathetic white Republicans, including teachers. Northern Democrats also opposed the Bureau's work, painting it as a program that would make African Americans "lazy". In 1872, the political will to extend the Bureau's life had diminished to the point that Congress abruptly abandoned the program, refusing to approve renewal legislation.

== The various bills ==
The Freedmen's Bureau was created in 1865 during the Lincoln administration, by an act of Congress called the Freedman's Bureau Bill. It was passed on March 3, 1865, in order to aid former slaves through food and housing, oversight, education, health care, and employment contracts with private landowners.

A follow-up Freedmen's Bureau Bill was vetoed by U.S. President Andrew Johnson on February 19, 1866, and Congress failed to override that veto on the following day.

That failed 1866 Freedmen's Bureau bill was closely related to the Civil Rights Act of 1866. On March 9, 1866, Congressman John Bingham explained that, "the seventh and eighth sections of the Freedmen's Bureau bill enumerate the same rights and all the rights and privileges that are enumerated in the first section of this [the Civil Rights] bill."

On May 29, 1866, the House passed a further Freedmen's Bureau Bill, and on June 26, 1866, the Senate passed an amended version. On July 3, 1866, both chambers passed a conference committee's compromise version.

On July 16, 1866, Congress received another presidential veto message, which Congress overrode later that day. This congressional action extended the Freedmen's Bureau, increased antipathy between President Johnson and Radical Republicans in Congress, and was a major factor during Reconstruction. The Freedmen's Bureau bill that passed in 1866 provided many additional rights to ex-slaves, including the distribution of land, schools for their children, and military courts to ensure these rights. The Freedmen's Bureau Act gave ex-slaves "any of the civil rights or immunities belonging to white persons, including the right to.....inherit, purchase, lease, sell, hold and convey real and personal property, and to have full and equal benefit of all laws and proceedings for the security of person and estate, including the constitutional right of bearing arms." This bill passed both House and Senate and they overrode the president's veto. This was in response to the Southern Black Codes & the KKK and other groups who were taking guns away from freedmen.

In July 1868, Congress voted to again extend the Freedmen's Bureau, but a couple weeks later decided to limit its functions to processing claims and supporting education. Four years later, in June 1872, Congress voted to completely shut down the Freedmen's Bureau by the end of that month.

== See also ==
- Slave Trade Acts
- List of United States presidential vetoes § Andrew Johnson
