= Alexander Harris (minister) =

African-American deacon

The Reverend Alexander Harris

Deacon and Ordained Minister First Bryan Baptist Church
- In office 1862–1871

Personal details
- Born: Alexander F. Harris; July 19, 1818 Savannah, Georgia, U.S.
- Died: October 9, 1909 (aged 91) Savannah, Georgia, U.S.
- Resting place: Laurel Grove Cemetery South
- Occupation: Baptist Ordained Minister; Civic Leader
- Known for: U.S. Civil War, First Bryan Baptist Church, Freemasonry

Alexander Harris (1818–1909) was an African-American deacon, trustee, interim pastor of the First Bryan Baptist Church and one of the most powerful African-American religious and civil leaders in Savannah, Georgia during the end of the 19th century and beginning of the 20th century.

With U.S. Civil War public figure Garrison Frazier and eighteen other African-American ministers and church officials, Harris met with Military Division of the Mississippi Union Army Major-General William Tecumseh Sherman and Secretary of War Edwin M. Stanton on January 12, 1865, at Sherman's Green-Meldrim House headquarters in Savannah, Georgia. This famous meeting, widely regarded as the "Savannah Colloquy" or the "Forty acres and a mule" meeting, resulted in Sherman issuing, on January 16, 1865, Special Field Orders, No. 15, also known as the "Forty acres and a mule" order.

== Early life ==
Born July 19, 1818, in Savannah, Georgia, Harris was a Free man his entire life. Although very little is known of his early life, Harris lived in Augusta, Georgia as a young man, working as a blacksmith.

In 1844, Harris married Frances F. Harris (March 15, 1818 - February 10, 1899). A free woman and a seamstress according to census records, Frances was believed to have had the maiden name of Fullers, since many of her relatives were Fullers. Harris and Frances had three children: Fuleria Frances Harris Montmollin (1849–1870), William Henry Harris (1853–1888), and Nathaniel D. Harris (1856–1879). Harris outlived Frances and their three children. Frances died at the age of 81 of old age and diarrhea.

== Service in the Confederate Army, U.S. Civil War activity ==
Harris enlisted in the Confederate Army during the U.S. Civil War where he served as a drummer with the Republican Blues drum and bugle corps. The Blues were an independent company of Georgia in the volunteer infantry. He was listed as "colored man, not mustered, but in service." He served from May 1861 to August 1862.

At the time of General Sherman's March to the Sea during the Civil War, Harris served as a deacon of the Third African Church, now known as First Bryan Baptist Church. Since Savannah, Georgia's city limits began at West Broad Street (now Martin Luther King Jr. Blvd.), the Confederate defenses rested along Ogeechee Canal. As a consequence, First Bryan Baptist Church was the only church sitting in the middle of the battlefield. As citizens fled the city of Savannah out of fear, officers of First Bryan refused to close the church's doors. Harris understood First Bryan Baptist Church's defenseless position and led officers of the church down to the Confederate defense line for the city at the Ogeechee Canal to request that the church be saved from destruction. Harris consulted with Dr. William Pollard, an officer of First Bryan Baptist Church, who approached Sherman's army as it came down Bay Road. Dr. Pollard gave one of Sherman's captains a torch that was used for light in the front of First Bryan Baptist Church. The captain used the torch so the army could see their way into the city. General Sherman summoned Dr. Pollard and gave him the assignment of contacting all African-Americans in Savannah to request that they gather in Greene Square on January 1, 1865, for the reading of the Emancipation Proclamation.

== Historic meeting with Union Army Major-General William Tecumseh Sherman ==
On January 12, 1865, Harris joined twenty African-American Baptist and Methodist ministers who met with Military Division of the Mississippi Union Army Major-General William Tecumseh Sherman and Secretary of War Edwin M. Stanton in the historic "Savannah Colloquy" or the "Forty acres and a mule" meeting. At the time of this meeting, Harris was 47 years old, having become a licensed ordained minister at Third African Baptist Church/First Bryan Baptist Church a month before. This church had more representatives at this meeting than any other congregation; Harris attended with several fellow pastors including Reverends Garrison Frazier and Ulysses L. Houston. Other African-American ministers invited were William Gaines and James D. Lynch (future Secretary of State of Mississippi).

== Ministry, history with Savannah State University ==
In 1873, Harris founded First Bryan Baptist Church (previously the First, Second and Third African Churches of Savannah) on West Board and Waldburg Streets, and the Mount Olive Baptist Association in 1872. He also served as the pastor of historic Nicolsonboro Baptist Church for many years.

Harris, with James M. Simms, Reverend Emanuel K. Love, J.H .C. Butler, James Ross, John McIntosh, and others helped to bring Georgia State Industrial College to Savannah in 1891. Georgia State Industrial College is known today as Savannah State University.

== Freemasonry in Georgia ==
One of the oldest Freemasons in Georgia at the time, Harris was among the first persons to be initiated in Savannah's Eureka Lodge No. 1 on February 4, 1866. Harris served as Junior Deacon of Eureka Lodge No. 11 (presently Eureka No. 1) in 1866, served as Senior Deacon of the Lodge in 1867, and became the Junior Warden in 1868. In 1869–1870, Harris served as Senior Warden, Worshipful Master for Eureka No. 1 in 1871, and Grand Master of the Most Worshipful Grand Lodge Free and Accepted Masons of Georgia -Colored (now the Most Worshipful Prince Hall Grand Lodge of Free and Accepted Mason for the Jurisdiction of Georgia) from June 1883 to June 1886.

== Death ==
Harris died in Savannah, Georgia on October 9, 1909, at 91 years old from senility after being sick for six months prior to his death.

Rev. George Henry Dwelle, Harris' life-long friend and the father of Dr. Georgia Rooks Dwelle (1884–1977), officiated Harris' funeral. Harris was interred at the historic Laurel Grove Cemetery-South in Savannah, Georgia. The Southern Cross of the Confederate States of America is installed at his gravesite.
