= Garrison Frazier =

African-American Baptist minister and public figure during the U.S. Civil War

Deacon, Ordained Minister and Pastor First Bryan Baptist Church
- In office December 1851 – 1860

Personal details
- Born: Garrison Frazier; 1798? Granville County, North Carolina, U.S. or Virginia
- Died: 1873 Savannah, Georgia, U.S.
- Cause of death: Unknown
- Resting place: Unknown
- Occupation: Baptist Ordained Minister; Church Pastor
- Known for: U.S. Civil War, First Bryan Baptist Church

Garrison Frazier (1798? - 1873) was an African-American Baptist minister and public figure during the U.S. Civil War. He acted as spokesman for twenty African-American Baptist and Methodist ministers who met on January 12, 1865 with Major General William Tecumseh Sherman, of the Union Army's Military Division of the Mississippi, and with U.S. Secretary of War Edwin Stanton, at General Sherman's headquarters in Savannah, Georgia. This meeting is commonly known as the "Savannah Colloquy" or the "Forty acres and a mule" meeting.

Frazier's intervention helped to motivate General Sherman's Special Field Orders, No. 15 or the "Forty acres and a mule" order. Issued January 16, 1865, this order instructed Union Army officers to settle African-American refugees on the Sea Islands and inland: a total of 400,000 acres divided into 40-acre plots. Though mules were not mentioned in the Special Order, some African-American refugees did receive mules from the army. These 40-acre plots were colloquially known as "Blackacres", which may have a basis for their origin in contract law.

At the time of the "Forty acres and a mule" meeting, Frazier was 67 years old.

== Early life ==
There are no clear records of Frazier's day of birth or his parentage. Nonetheless, Frazier was considered to be of pure African blood. There is some confusion on Frazier's birth place. One account lists Frazier's birth place as Granville County, North Carolina, located just north of Durham, North Carolina. Another account lists Frazier's birthplace in Virginia.

Where it is not clearly documented who owned him, Frazier and his wife Diana Williams' enslavers brought them to Georgia around 1850. Having been enslaved for sixty years, Frazier purchased his and his wife's freedom in 1856, paying $1,000 (~$27,918 in 2025) in gold and silver.

Frazier lived on White Bluffs Road in Savannah, Georgia. Frazier and his wife had several children: William Fraser, Roderick O'Neil, John Stafford, Chas Frazier, son Andrew, son Green, daughter Bell Atkinson, and Charity Williams.

== Ministry ==
Initially a member of the Methodist Church in Georgia, Frazier joined the Baptist Church after later becoming convinced "that the Baptist faith was according to the Bible." He was baptized at Savannah, Georgia's Third African Church (later renamed the First Bryan Baptist Church), becoming ordained in the ministry as First Bryan Baptist Church's pastor in December, 1851. He was First Bryan Baptist Church's 8th pastor, serving from December 1851 to 1860. Overall, Frazier served in the ministry for 35 years.

Frazier was known to be "endowed with fair natural gifts, a commanding presence, and a good voice." Considered plain and impressive as a preacher though not learned in theology, Frazier understood and could explain the doctrines of Christ quite clearly.

With the U.S. Civil War roaring throughout the South and with his health failing, Frazier resigned as First Bryan Baptist Church's pastor in 1861. He was succeeded by Deacon Ulysses L. Houston, also a "Forty acres and a mule" colloquy attendee. In fact, First Bryan Baptist Church had more representatives at the "Forty acres and a mule" meeting than any other church.

After his official duties at First Bryan Baptist Church, Frazier was still regarded by Savannah's African-American community and fellow clergymen as a respected elder and highly knowledgeable leader.

== General Sherman's March to the Sea, Savannah's Refugee Crisis, Frazier's "Forty Acres and a Mule" Colloquy ==
As General Sherman executed his military strategy to defeat the Confederacy, he divided his efforts along a West-to-East path following the Confederacy's strategic rail lines. Sherman's Army would exchange its inland base of Atlanta for the more secure base in coastal Savannah, now controlled by the Union Navy. By destroying the Confederacy's manufacturing, rail & communication systems, food/livestock access, and enslaved labor infrastructure, Sherman disrupted the Southern economy, preventing the Southern Army from defending its heartland.

In addition to a cavalry division, Sherman's forces comprised two armies or wings. The right wing/southern column, the Army of the Tennessee, marched along the Georgia railroad, the Macon and Western railroad. The left-wing or Army of Georgia, led by General Henry Warner Slocum, marched following the Georgia railroad, feinting toward Augusta, Georgia. Sherman's plan was to confuse the Confederate Army as to his objectives. His initial target was Georgia's then-state capital Milledgeville, Georgia, captured on November 22, 1864. The ultimate objective was Savannah, captured and occupied on December 21, 1864. This March to the Sea or Savannah Campaign, was among the most effective campaigns of the Civil War.

As Union armies march upon Savannah, over 17,000 formerly-enslaved African-Americans had abandoned Georgia and South Carolina plantations, following Slocum's 26,703 troops. Though General Slocum and his troops employed some of these newly freed refugees as pontoon builders and road-building detachments, General Sherman complained that such a large contingent of refugees could disrupt the Union Army's military operations, possibly bringing defeat to Union forces should they encounter a respectable enemy force, especially as Slocum's left wing turned its attention north to the Carolinas. This became a real concern when hundreds of African-American refugees either drowned or were captured and re-enslaved by Confederate forces during the Ebenezer Creek Massacre of December 8, 1865.

Secretary of War Edwin M. Stanton suggested to General Sherman that they meet with "the leaders of the local Negro community" to discuss Savannah's refugee crisis, and what the clergymen wanted for their people after the war had concluded. On January 12, 1865 at 8:00PM, twenty African-American Baptist and Methodist ministers including Frazier, Ulysses L. Houston, William Gaines, James D. Lynch (future Secretary of State of Mississippi), and Alexander Harris met with General Sherman and Secretary Stanton. The meeting took place at General Sherman's Gothic-style Southern mansion headquarters, the Green-Meldrim House, in Savannah.

Garrison Frazier, selected by his fellow clergyman as spokesperson, introduced each of his fellow clergymen by name and position in their church.

After Sherman and Stanton gave the group assurances of protection and provision until the refugees could be settled, Frazier answered twelve questions, eloquently addressing the desires of African-Americans fleeing chattel enslavement.

According to accounts, Sherman and Stanton were impressed by Frazier's precise reason for the US Civil War, President Lincoln's Emancipation Proclamation, and its implication for African-Americans. Frazier is most known for the following "Forty acres and a mule" colloquy:

Question: "State in what manner you think you can take care of yourselves, and how can you best assist the Government in maintaining your freedom."

Brother Frazier: "The way we can best take care of ourselves is to have land, and turn it and till it by our own labor–that is, by the labor of the women and children and old men; and we can soon maintain ourselves and have something to spare. And to assist the Government, the young men should enlist in the service of the Government, and serve in such manner as they may be wanted. (The Rebels told us that they piled them up and made batteries of them, and sold them to Cuba; but we don't believe that.) We want to be placed on land until we are able to buy it and make it our own."

Question: "State in what manner you would rather live–whether scattered among the whites or in colonies by yourselves."

Brother Frazier: "I would prefer to live by ourselves, for there is a prejudice against us in the South that will take years to get over; but I do not know that I can answer for my brethren."

== Aftermath of Sherman's Meeting, Special Field Orders, Number 15 ==
Four days later, Sherman issued his Special Field Orders, No. 15.

The orders provided for the settlement of 40,000 formerly enslaved African-Americans on a large expanse of coastal land expropriated from white landowners in South Carolina, Georgia, and Florida. This land stretched from Charleston, South Carolina, to northern Florida, "for the settlement of the negroes now made free by the acts of war and the proclamation of the President of the United States." Each family would be allotted "forty acres of tillable ground….in the possession of which land the military authorities will afford them protection, until such time as they can protect themselves, or until Congress shall regulate their title." Sherman appointed Brig. Gen. Rufus Saxton, an abolitionist from Massachusetts who had previously directed the recruitment of black soldiers, to implement that plan. Those orders, which became the basis of the claim that the Union government had promised freed slaves "40 acres and a mule", were revoked later that year by President Andrew Johnson.

== Later life, death ==
Soon after the historic "Forty acres and a mule" meeting, Frazier became enfeebled from age, though he did conduct some missionary work with the country churches for a few years.

Frazier lived on White Bluffs Road in White Bluff, Georgia or "White Bluff", formerly a quiet collection of African-American communities (Nicholsonboro, Rose Dhu, Twin Hill, and Cedar Grove) eight miles southeast of Savannah - now part of the Savannah metro area.

Frazier was also registered to vote in 1870.

Frazier died in 1873. His burial site is unknown.

== Legacy ==
Charles Elmore, professor emeritus of humanities at Savannah State University and the world's foremost authority on Garrison Frazier, believed that both Frazier's presence and eloquence had a significant impact on General Sherman, sufficient to inspire Special Field Orders, No. 15.

The other men chose this eloquent, 67-year-old imposing Black man, who was well over 6 feet tall, to speak on their behalf," Elmore says. "And he said essentially we want to be free from domination of white men, we want to be educated, and we want to own land.

Historian Kevin M. Levin, highlighting Frazier's critical importance to a more multi-dimensional, comprehensive Civil War history, notes:

The problem too often with popular discussions of this history is that they focus on a few figures—Lincoln, Johnson, Sherman, etc.—or collapse these complexities into simplistic generalizations—especially about the North vs. the "South."

I say this not out of a sense of professional superiority or jealousy, but because I feel strongly that bad history makes bad politics. And it's very rare to see discussions of the South in politics today that don't invoke history to some extent.... [ ] When I see discussions in the media or blogosphere about "the South," I know I'm likely to hear mostly if not entirely about the white South. When I read people repeating the popular line that the "South lost the war but won the peace," it's clear to me that they don't have Garrison Frazier in mind. I don't mean to suggest that the only problem here is race (though that's certainly a large part of it). It's also that complex events get reduced to questions about the judgment or character of an individual, so that the coming of emancipation, for example, gets debated as a question of what Lincoln thought about slavery and race. This is not, let me emphasize, an argument that the great "dead white men" don't matter (which strikes me primarily as a caricature anyway). Rather, it's an argument that they need to be understood as part of an historical process—one that connects Lincoln, for example, not just to other politicians and to the northern public, but also to soldiers and officers in the field, to runaway slaves, and to black leaders like Garrison Frazier.

== Memorial to Frazier and Fellow First Bryan Baptist Church Pastor ==
In 2014, the Georgia Historical Society dedicated a Historical Marker at First Bryan Baptist Church, highlighting the roles former First Bryan Baptist Church pastors Garrison Frazier and Ulysses Houston played in the seminal meeting with General Sherman in January 1865:

First Bryan Baptist Church - Constituted 1788

First Bryan dates its founding to the constitution of the Ethiopian Church of Jesus Christ under Rev. Andrew Bryan in January 1788, making it one of the nation's oldest African-American Baptist churches. Known later as First Colored Church, First African, and Third African, the congregation took the name First Bryan Baptist in 1867. Construction of the first church building began here in 1793 on property purchased by Reverend Bryan. The current building was completed in 1874.

First Bryan ministers including Garrison Frazier and Ulysses Houston attended the nearby meeting of local black leaders with Gen. Sherman in January 1865 that resulted in Special Field Orders No. 15, promising confiscated coastal land to freed slaves. In the twentieth century, Civil Rights leader W. W. Law taught Sunday School at First Bryan for many years. Erected by the Georgia Historical Society and First Bryan Baptist Church.
