= James M. Simms =

African-American minister

Personal details
- Born: December 27, 1823 Savannah, Georgia, U.S.
- Died: July 9, 1912 (aged 88) Savannah, Georgia, U.S.
- Party: Republican

James Merilus Simms (December 27, 1823 – July 9, 1912) was a minister, newspaper publisher, author, and elected representative in the Georgia Assembly during the Reconstruction era. He was African American.

Simms was born a slave in Savannah, Georgia. A carpenter by trade, he bought his freedom in 1857. In around 1864, having been condemned for teaching slaves, he was sentenced to be publicly whipped and fined $100 (~$2,059 in 2025). He left Savannah for Boston and became a chaplain in the Union Army, later returning to his home district. Simms may have been the same person as James M. Symms whose company published an edition of William Wells Brown's The Black Man in 1863.

Readable pdf of The black man - his antecedents, his genius, and his achievements

Simms and his African-American colleagues in the Georgia Assembly were prohibited from taking office after a vote by their colleagues. Federal intervention in 1870 overturned the discriminatory action. In 1871, Simms became the first African American judge in Georgia when he was appointed to the First Senatorial District Court. However, due to his unpopularity with Republicans and the white press, Simms resigned less than a year later. He wrote about his church's history in Savannah, Georgia.

In 1870, he supported the Baptist minister and Assembly delegate Ulysses L. Houston in occupying the Bryan County Baptist Church, which had been taken over by his rival Alexander Harris; for their role in this protest, Houston and Simms were both arrested.

== See also ==
- First Bryan Baptist Church
