= James D. Lynch =

American politician (1839–1872)

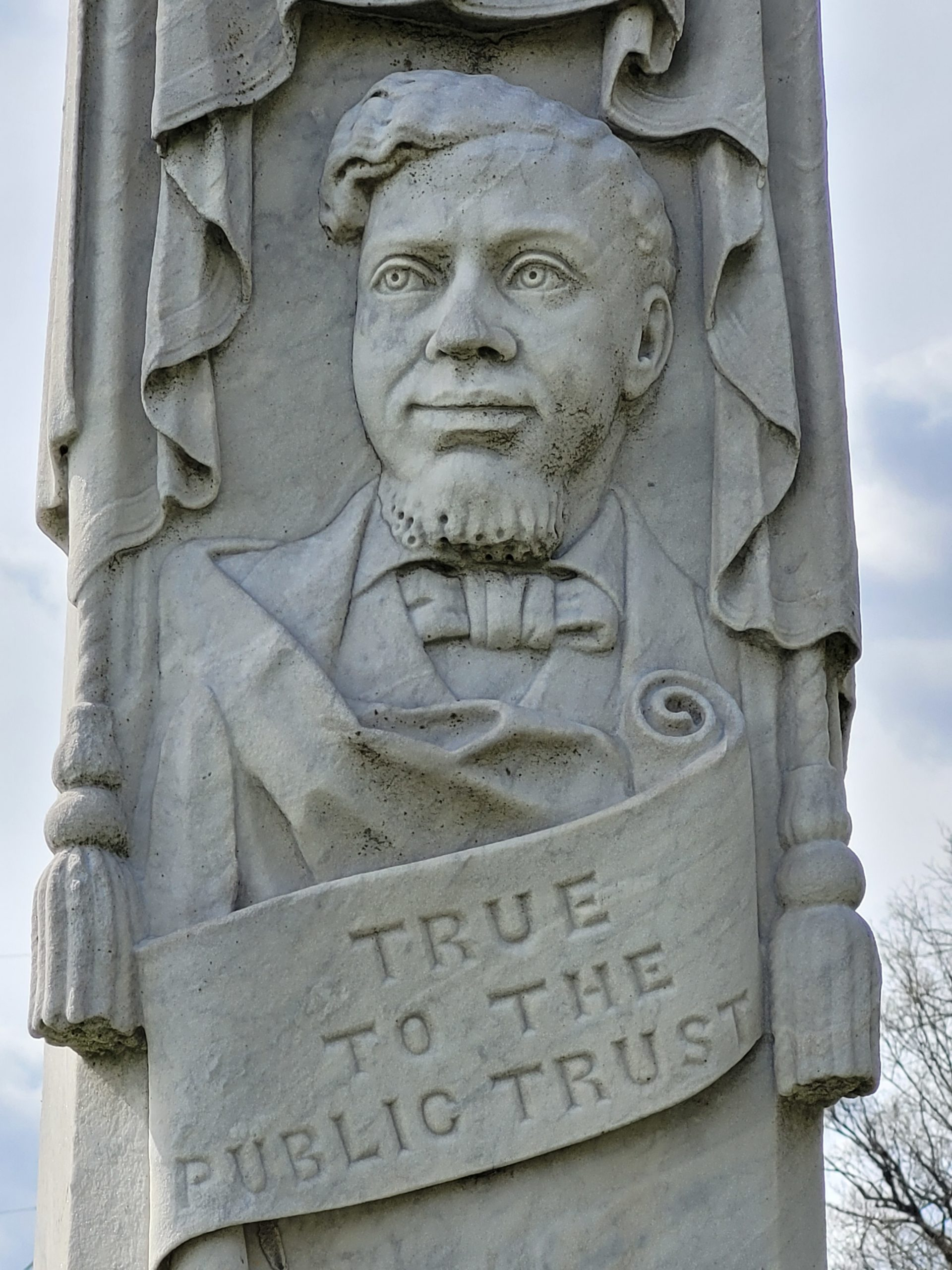
- Statue of Lynch

19th Secretary of State of Mississippi
- In office 1869 – December 18, 1872
- Governor: Adelbert Ames; James L. Alcorn; Ridgely C. Powers
- Preceded by: Henry Musgrove
- Succeeded by: Hannibal C. Carter

Personal details
- Born: 1839 Baltimore, Maryland
- Died: December 18, 1872 (aged 34) Mississippi
- Party: Republican

James D. Lynch (1839 – December 18, 1872) was a missionary, public official, and state legislator in the United States. He was the first African-American Secretary of State of Mississippi, and a minister.

== Early life and career ==
Lynch was born in Baltimore, Maryland. His mother was a slave and his father was a white merchant and minister. Lynch obtained his early education at an elementary school, instructed by Reverend Daniel Payne of the African Methodist Episcopal Church. Lynch attended Kimball Union Academy in New Hampshire, where he spent two years, and then moved to Indianapolis, where he committed himself to ministry. Kimball Union Academy was one of the few Northern schools prior to 1860 that allowed African Americans students to attend. He preached at a small church in the town of Galena, Illinois.

== Rise in prominence ==
In 1863, Lynch was appointed a "Missionary and Government Superintendent" at Beaufort, South Carolina.

Lynch was the youngest of the 20 Black church leaders who met with Secretary of War Edwin Stanton and Union General William Tecumseh Sherman at the Green–Meldrim House at what would later be called the "Savannah Colloquy" on January 12, 1865. Others who participated included Garrison Frazier, Ulysses L. Houston, and William Gaines. Their discussion directly led to Sherman's Special Field Orders No. 15, which included the famous Forty acres and a mule land allotment.

Following the Civil War, Lynch later joined other missionaries in South Carolina. Between 1865 and 1866, Lynch helped to establish churches and schools in South Carolina and Georgia for African American children and adults. In 1868 Lynch then moved to Mississippi as an official of the Methodist Episcopal Church North. Within a year of Lynch's arrival, the church increased by approximately six thousand African Americans, and twenty meeting houses were created. Soon Lynch began to realize that the political rights of the freedmen were just as important as their religious faith. Lynch and others organized the Republican Party in Mississippi, where they later held the first party convention in September 1867 in Jackson. At this time Lynch was elected vice-president of the organization because of his prior services to the party. Lynch then worked to creating a new constitution for Mississippi, where he took a moderate stance. He campaigned to secure voter support for a constitutional convention, in addition to verifying the election of Republican delegates. To further stress his position and the importance of black unity, Lynch became involved with the newspaper business, and became a publisher and editor of his publication called Jackson Colored Citizen.

During the organization of the [1868 "Black and Tan"] convention, it was moved that the word "colored" be added to the name of each Negro delegate. Thereupon, the Reverend James Lynch, a colored man, afterward Secretary of State, moved to amend it so that the color of each delegate's hair should be added also.

== Secretary of State of Mississippi ==
In 1869, Lynch was elected secretary of state, defeating his convention rival Dr. Thomas W. Stringer by a vote of 158 to 36. As a result, Lynch became the first African American state official in Mississippi. While Secretary of State, Lynch had to pay for some of the expenses out of his own pocket because people previously believed that it did not take much to run an administrative department. Lynch worked to improve the public school system throughout the state and acquired support from whites. In 1871, Lynch was re-elected. In 1872, he served as a delegate to the National Republican Convention. While in his second term, Lynch and his African American supporters started to become disillusioned with the Reconstruction process, along with the increasing tension amongst the black and European-American Republicans.

== Death ==
Also in 1872, Lynch was troubled with Bright's disease of the kidney, accompanied by the recurrence of pneumonia. On December 18, 1872, he died at the age of thirty-four. Lynch received a state funeral, in which the governor of Mississippi, R.C. Powers, was one of the pallbearers. Lynch was buried at Greenwood Cemetery in Jackson, Mississippi, where city and state officials, three black fire brigades, a black charitable order, Friendly Brothers, and a large concourse of African Americans followed the procession to the grave. Republicans, who still controlled the state legislature, passed a bill appropriating a thousand dollars for the erection of a monument.
