= First Bryan Baptist Church =

Historic church in Georgia, United States

- U.S. National Register of Historic Places
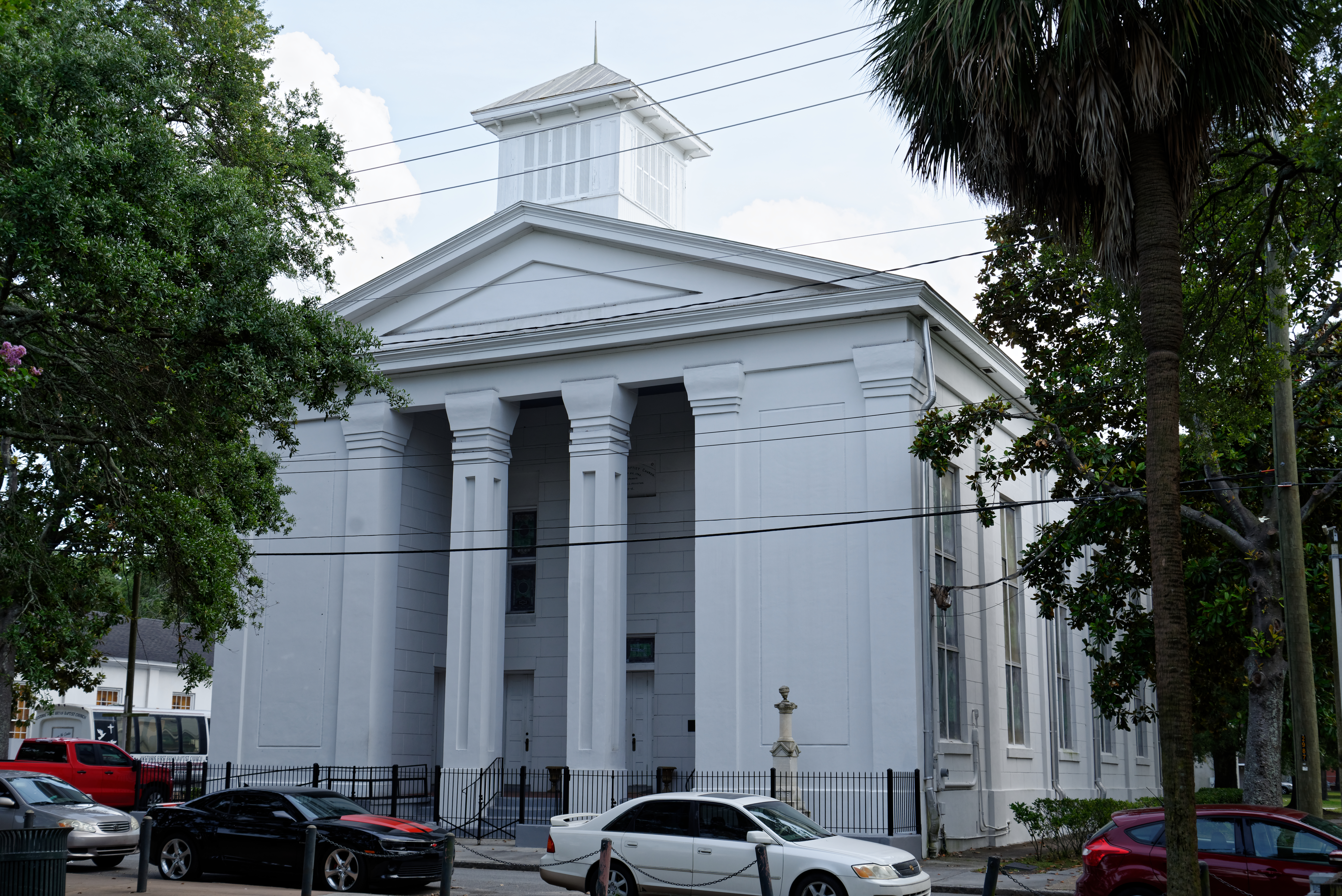
- First Bryan Baptist Church in 2025

- Location within Georgia Location within the United States
- Location: 575 W. Bryan Street, Savannah, Georgia
- Coordinates: 32.08208°N 81.09906°W
- Built: 1873
- Architect: John B. Hogg
- Website: www.fbbcsav.org
- Part of: Savannah Historic District
- NRHP reference No.: 78000971
- Added to NRHP: May 22, 1978

First Bryan Baptist Church is a church organized in Savannah, Georgia by Andrew Bryan in 1788 for African-Americans. Considered to be the Mother Church of Black Baptists, the site was purchased in 1793 by Bryan, a former slave who had also purchased his freedom. The first structure was erected there in 1794. By 1800 the congregation was large enough to split: those at Bryan Street took the name of First African Baptist Church, and Second and Third African Baptist churches were also established. The current sanctuary of First Bryan Baptist Church was constructed in 1873.

== History ==
George Liele was a slave whose unusual talent and leadership ability was recognized by both black and white people. He converted about 1774, was baptized, and received into the membership of the Baptist church (white) in Burke County, of which Rev. Matthew Moore was pastor. His master, Mr. Henry Sharpe, who was a deacon in this church, permitted George Liele to visit the neighboring plantations along the Savannah River and preach to the slaves. On one of his visits to Brampton, a plantation owned by Mr. Jonathan Bryan, four slaves became converted, were baptized and became the nucleus of the first black missionary Baptist church. These slaves were Andrew Bryan, his wife Hannah, Kate Hogg and Hagar Simpson. This was George Liele's last recorded visit. Andrew Bryan was also talented, and with permission of Mr. Bryan, began to visit the plantations along the river as far as Yamacraw, preaching to black and white person who gathered to hear him. Mr. Edward Davis (white) permitted the worshipers to erect a rough wooden building on his land in Yamacraw.

Rev. Thomas Burton and Rev. Abraham Marshall (white) became interested in the growing group of worshipers and on January 20, 1788, visited the services. Rev. Marshall baptized 45 converts and ordained Andrew Bryan to the ministry will full authority to preach the gospel and administer the ordinances of the Baptist church. On this same date, he organized the group into what one day would be named the First Bryan Baptist Church, and installed Andrew Bryan as the first pastor. The church continued to hold services, often under adverse and painful conditions, at Brampton and in the temporary building in Yamacraw. Meanwhile, Rev. Bryan was able to secure his freedom from Mr. Bryan for a minimal sum and thereby devoted his time exclusively to his ministry. A third meeting place was provided by Mr. Thomas Gibbons who gave a lot to Andrew Bryan for this purpose. The lot was situated on Mill Street, running to Indian Street Lane. A temporary building was erected there. This lot was conveyed June 1, 1790, to "Free Andrew." The main United States Post Office is now located on this site. With the help of the members and white friends who were sympathetic to the efforts of the church, Rev. Bryan was able to purchase the lot upon which the church now stands for "thirty pounds sterling" (approximately $150.00), and erected a church, making this site the oldest parcel of real estate owned continuously by black people in the United States. This site is described as lot No. 7, Middle Oglethorpe Ward, 95 feet front, and 132 and a half feet deep. The deeds are dated September 4, 1793.

The First Bryan Baptist Church was incorporated by the State of Georgia in 1866, and appears for the first time in the Records of Deeds of Chatham County, September 4, 1793. Rev. Bryan pastored the church until his death in 1812. Andrew C. Marshall became the pastor in 1815.

During the period between 1788 and 1832, the first Sunday School for blacks was organized at this church in 1826 by Mr. Lowell Mason, who also organized the first Sunday School in Savannah, at the Independent Presbyterian Church. He was the first superintendent and was assisted by Messrs. George Coe, John Lewis and James Barr, all members of the Independent Presbyterian Church. This Sunday School was very successful and remained under supervision until December, 1835 when the Presbyterian Church turned it over to First Bryan. It is still in operation.

In 1832, a controversy over doctrine caused the First African Baptist congregation at Bryan Street to split. Some members left, taking with them the name of First African Baptist Church. In 1859, the members of this new congregation (most of whom were slaves) built their current church building on Franklin Square. The congregation became confused and finally hopelessly divided on doctrinal matters and as a result, Rev. Marshall and a large group of members left the mother church in 1832 and moved to Franklin Square where they occupied a building secured from a white congregation, and organized the First African Baptist Church. The remainder of the members stayed on the original site and continued to worship under the leadership of the deacons until 1833.

From 1833 until 1861 First Bryan had six pastors and existed under trying conditions. In 1861, Rev. Ulysses L. Houston became pastor and First Bryan began to prosper and has continued to make phenomenal progress.

=== Civil War and Emancipation Proclamation ===
Before the Civil War, and its aftermath, First Bryan's pastor and several church members played integral roles in the emancipation of blacks in Savannah. James Merilus Simms, a trustee and ordained minister of First Bryan, went to Richmond, Virginia in 1862 and returned to Savannah with the preliminary draft of the Emancipation Proclamation to share with Savannah's black leadership and population. As a result of his efforts, black Savannah held a celebration dinner with Rev. Ulysses L. Houston giving the invocation and James Porter, the main address on January 1, 1863. Edward Wicks, church clerk for fifty years (1870-1920), was a Union soldier during the Civil War (24th United States Colored Infantry Regiment). Ulysses L. Houston and James Merilus Simms, the pastor and trustee respectively, of First Bryan served in the Reconstruction legislature of Georgia from 1869-1871 (they were initially expelled in 1868).

By January 12, 1865, in the Green-Meldrim Mansion, Ulysses L. Houston, pastor, Third African Baptist; Alexander Harris, Deacon and ordained minister, Third African Baptist, and eighteen black ministers from First African Baptist, Second Baptist, Andrew Methodist Chapel, Bishop W. J. Gaines, James Lynch, founder of the Georgia AME Church, and James Porter met with General William T. Sherman, Edwin Stanton, Secretary of War, General Oliver Otis Howard, Director Freedmen's Bureau, to discuss the future of former slaves in Savannah. Today, Field Order No. 15 is known in American history as "Forty Acres And A Mule". As a result of this Order, Rev. U. L. Houston led 1,000 blacks to Skidaway Island, where they farmed and raised crops until 1866, when white citizens regained the land.

== Current building ==
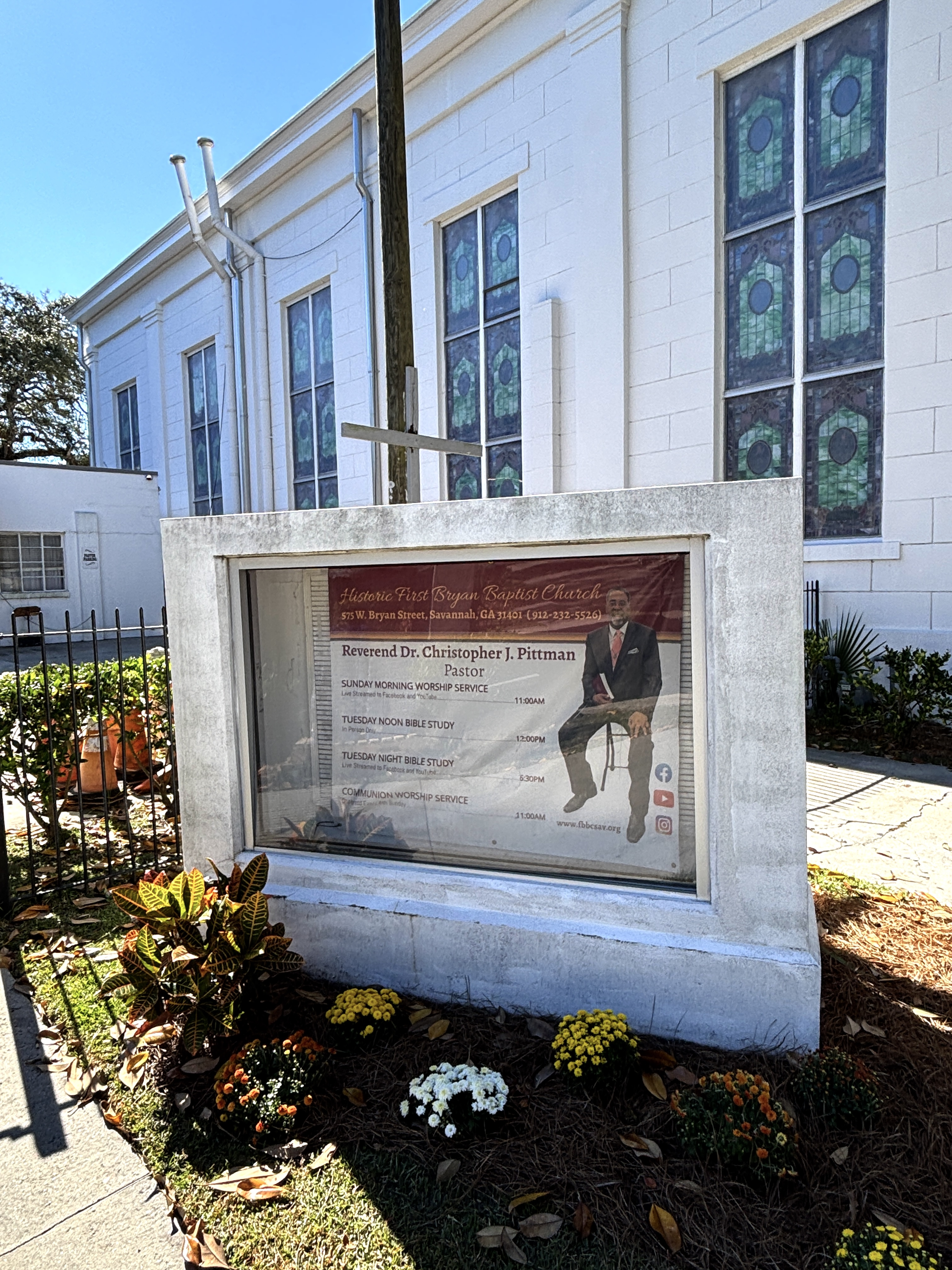
Church marquee sign

August 18, 1873, the congregation, in conference, decided to tear down the building built by Rev. Andrew Bryan and erect a new and modernized edifice for worship. The draft of the plan made by John B. Hogg (white), a civil engineer and city surveyor, free of charge, was shown to the congregation. The plan was accepted on September 29, 1873 at the last communion in the old building. Pictures were made, copies of which were sold for one dollar to help with the building fund.

The cornerstone for the building (present edifice) was laid on October 13, 1873, by the Grand Lodge of Georgia, Prince Hall, attended by two subordinate Lodges. The cornerstone contains a cooper box presented by the Sunday School at a cost of twenty-two dollars. In the box are artifacts given by the members (jewelry, coins, etc.) and receipts, newspaper clippings and other church records.

The labor on the building was done exclusively by black mechanics under the supervision of the architect. The style of architecture is almost pure Corinthian and is similar in design to that of Wesley Chapel in London, England, and the Trinity Methodist Church in Savannah, the plans for which were also made by Mr. Hogg and completed in 1850.

The outer dimensions of the building are: length, 75 feet; breadth, 56 feet; height from the foundation to the peak of the roof, 45 feet; with a belfry above containing a bell. A spacious gallery occupies three sides, with the lower audience room provides a seating capacity of 1,500 persons. On the inside, the distance from the floor to the ceiling is 26 feet. The cost of this building was about $30,000, not including furnishings. A pipe organ was purchased from the Independent Presbyterian Church at a cost of $1,350. This organ was built by H. Knauff Company of Philadelphia in 1856 and was bought by the Presbyterian Church. It was damaged by fire in 1889, and was sold to First Bryan in the early 1890s. It is not in use now but remains as a beautiful showpiece in the sanctuary. Plans are underway to restore this instrument. The building was completed, and on the evening of January 20, 1888, one hundred years after the organization of this first black Baptist congregation, special services marking this occasion was held for the first time. In this same year the first history of this congregation was written by Rev. James Merilus Simms, an office and member of the church. The history was published by J. B. Lippencott and Company of Philadelphia, Pennsylvania.

In October 1940, the Yamacraw community became Yamacraw Village when the cornerstone was laid for this well-known Federal Housing Project. Over the hears, First Bryan Baptist Church continues to provide spiritual and financial resources to uplift the families in the Yamacraw Village community. In 1956, the Education Building was dedicated. This building contains classrooms, offices and an assembly hall named for Dr. M. P. Sessoms, who served as superintendent for many years, and under whose leadership the Church School was highly organized and functioned effectively as a Christian education center.

The present edifices, built in 1873, still exists at 575 W. Bryan St. Savannah, Georgia. The site, buildings and furnishings are estimated to be approximately one and a half million dollars. This church was listed on the National Register of Historic Places in 1978. Tours of the church are available upon request.

== Pastors ==
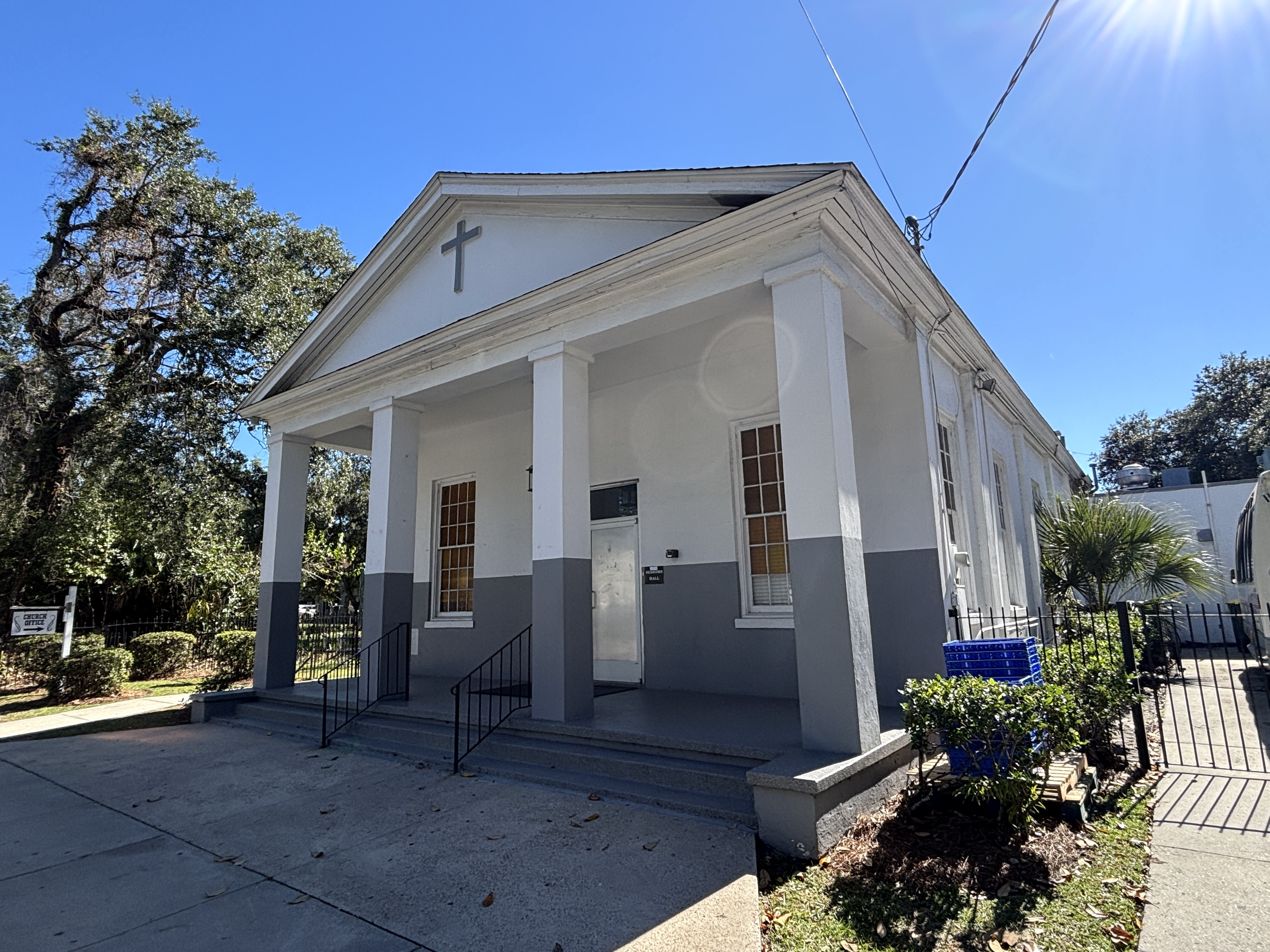
Sessoms Hall

- Andrew Bryan – 1788–1812
- Andrew Cox Marshall – 1815–1832
- Thomas Anderson – 1833–1835
- Stephen McQueen – 1835–1841
- John Benjamin DeVeaux – 1842–1845
- Isaac Roberts – 1846–1849
- Brister Lawton – 1849–1850
- Garrison Frazier – 1852–1860
- Ulysses L. Houston – 1861–1889
- George Griffin – 1889–1907
- Daniel Wright – 1908–1923
- Lawrence M. Glenn – 1924–1934
- Levi M. Terrill – 1935–1943
- Nathaniel E. Holsey – 1943–1949
- Richard M. Williams – 1949–1965
- Ervin J. Jennings Jr. – 1965–1973
- Arthur D. Sims – 1974–1982
- Edward L. Ellis Jr. – 1985–2011
- Aaron M. James Sr. – 2011–2016
- Christopher J. Pittman - 2019–Present

== Historical highlights ==
1700s

- 1784 – Andrew Bryan, Hannah Bryan, and Kate Hogg baptized by George Leile.
- 1784 – Andrew Bryan given permission to preach January 20, 1788 – First Bryan Baptist Church organized, Andrew Bryan ordained and installed as the First Pastor.
- 1793 – Andrew Bryan obtained his freedom and purchased the present site of this church for $150.00.
- 1795 – First church building completed.

1800s

- 1812 – Andrew Bryan's Death.
- 1815 – Andrew Marshall became the second pastor.
- 1826 – First Sunday School for Blacks, organized by Lowell Mason, Superintendent of the Independent Presbyterian Church.
- 1832 – Church split over doctrinal matters with pastor and a portion of the membership moved to a building on Franklin Square.
- 1833 – Church remained in continuous operation under the deacons led by Deacon Adam Johnson.
- 1835 – Administration of Sunday School relinquished by the Independent Presbyterian Church and assumed by the Black Church.
- 1836–1916 – Period of struggle, decline in membership and a series of six ministers but still in continuous operation.
- 1853 – March 19, Death of Deacon Adam Johnson after 40 years of service.
- 1861 – Ulysses Houston installed as pastor.
- 1866 – First Bryan Baptist Church Chartered by the State of Georgia.
- 1873 – Congregation decided to build a new and modern church – Plan drafted by John B. Hogg (or Howard), a Civil Engineer. Building raised – Cornerstone laid October 13, 1873.
- January 20, 1888 – Present edifice completed at a cost of $30,000.00 and occupied for the first time.
- 1888 – Covenant, Constitution and By-Laws written, printed and distributed to the membership.
- 1888 – Pipe Organ built by H. Knauff and Company of Philadelphia, Pennsylvania in 1856, installed at a cost of $1,250.00.
- 1888 – Death of Ulysses L. Houston.
- 1888–1915 – Growth of congregation, monumental program broadened, physical plant modernized.

1900s

- 1916 – Monument to George Leile erected on this site by authorization of the National Baptist Convention, Inc.
- 1938 – 1st Sesqui-Centennial Celebration held.
- 1945 – Dedication of addition to the main edifice to provide a choir stand at the rear of the pulpit.
- 1956 – Dedication of the Educational Annex ($25,000.00)
- 1974 – Participation in planning for Bicentennial Celebration of the United States with the "Downtown Nine" historic churches.
- 1975 – Completed a brief historical sketch up to 1975.
- 1976 – Cultural Bicentennial Contribution Morehouse Male Glee Club, March 14;
  - Bicentennial Recognition Banquet honoring 3 outstanding church historians, April contributed historical material to "Savannah's Time-Capsule", issued Memorial Plate, 1788–1976;
  - Musical Contribution to "Night in Old Savannah", began permanent historical exhibit of church, evaluated church and furnishings($500,000.00);
  - Applied for Historic Landmark Status; opened the church to the public on a restricted basis;
  - Reissued and promoted sales of original history.
- 1977 – Hosted the 107th Session of the General Missionary Baptist Convention of Georgia, Inc.
- 1979 – January 20, unveiled plaque indicating Historic Landmark Status. This is placed on the exterior of the main sanctuary.
- 1979 – February 11, recording of First Live TV. Ministry telecast for Coastal Georgia on WJCL-ABC Channel 22. Televised from the walls of the sanctuary of the Mother Church of Black Baptists.
- 1979 – April 15, the first live TV. Broadcast appearance Easter Sunday Morning having received one of the highest TV ratings for religious broadcast programs in 1979 on WJCL-ABC Channel 22.
- 1979 – May 20, unveiled the first historical marker, granted to blacks in Georgia. This marker is situated on the land area in front of the church and may be read from either direction. Dr. Elizabeth Lyon, Chief of Georgia's Historical Preservation Section, was the main speaker.
- 1985 – Reverend Edward Lamar Ellis Jr., is the 18th pastor of First Bryan Baptist Church. He is a native of Monroe, GA, and the eldest of four children born to the late Mr. and Mrs. Edward Lamar Ellis Sr.
- 1987 – During a massive renovation, stained glass windows were installed. The altar windows were redesigned to include a picture of Rev. Andrew Bryan, the founding pastor of the church.
- 1988 – January 10–20, Celebrated Bicentennial. Theme – "We've Come This Far By Faith". The theme "Moving Forward in Love, the More Excellent Way, as We Continue in the New Millennium" was implemented during Pastor Ellis' tenure.
- 1988 – Celebrated its Bicentennial on January 20, 1988, the birthday of the church; the cornerstone laid in October 1873 was opened. It contained some 400 artifacts, coins, jewelry, etc.
- 1988, July 10, Pastor Ellis presided over the laying of another cornerstone that contained a bible, church records and other articles donated by members.
- 1994 – Dr. Charles J. Elmore, Professor of Humanities at Savannah State University, historian and author, was authorized by the church to write a history of First Bryan Baptist Church. The title of the book is First Bryan 1788–2001 The Oldest Continuous Black Baptist Church in America. It has been well received and is now in circulation locally and throughout the United States.

== See also ==
- Lester Anthony, church organist for 46 years
