= Wesley John Gaines =

American church and community leader (1840–1912)

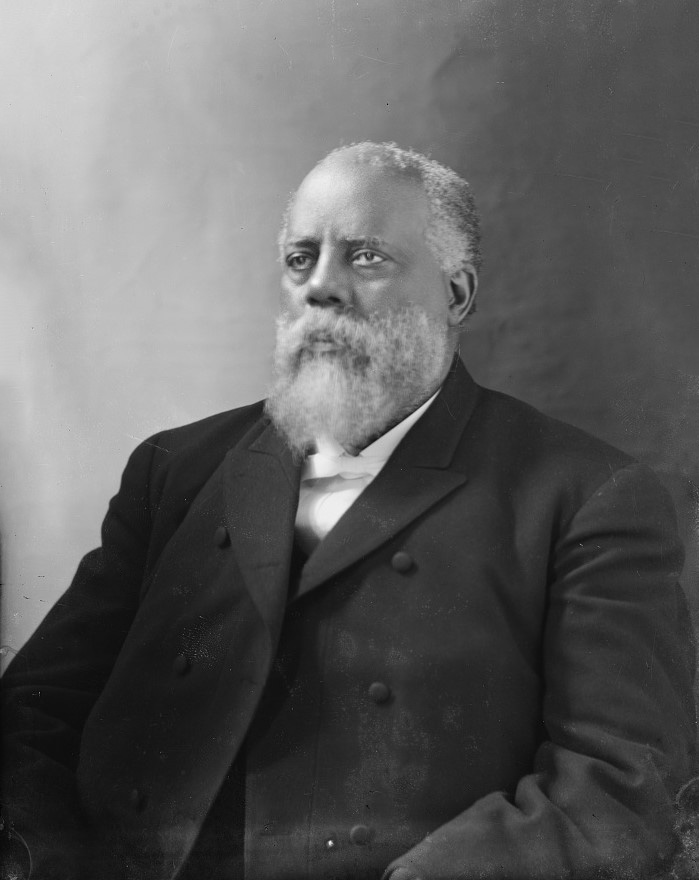
- Born: October 4, 1840; Wilkes County, Georgia, U.S.
- Died: January 12, 1912 (aged 71)

Bishop Wesley John Gaines (October 4, 1840 – January 12, 1912) was a church and community leader in Georgia. He was vice president of Payne Theological Seminary and co-founder of Morris Brown College. He was African-American.

== Early life ==
Gaines was born in Wilkes County, Georgia, one of fourteen children of his enslaved parents, Louisa and William Gaines. He was named for John Wesley, the founder of Methodism, the religion of his father. His mother was a Baptist. He grew up on a plantation as a slave. He learned the alphabet when he was eleven and then learned to write using a copy book. Sick as a child, he taught himself to read while in bed.

He took to religion at a young age, reading the bible and experiencing conversion when he was nine years of age. By the time he was fifteen or sixteen years of age, he became interested in becoming a preacher. In 1855, he was moved to Stewart County, Georgia and the following year to Muskogee County, Georgia. At more than 300 pounds and 6'2" tall, he said he was sold at one point for $1,000. His brother William Gaines also became a minister and community leader.

== Career ==
Bishop Gaines is one of the shining lights of the African Methodist Episcopal church. He is a pious, well-educated and eloquent preacher, fine looking, of imposing presence and of blended politeness and dignity. He possesses both administrative and creative capacity of high order, and adds to his energy firmness and ability, excellent tact and discretion. He has done some remarkable work in getting money and building churches.

— The National Cyclopaedia of American Biography

In 1865, he was licensed to preach, first for the Methodist Episcopal Church. Beginning in 1867, Gaines studied theology and served at African Methodist Episcopal Church (AME Church) pastorates in Wilmington, North Carolina, Atlanta, Macon and Athens, Georgia for 20 years beginning. Under his leadership, the Bethel AME Church in Atlanta became the largest African American church in the south. He received his Doctor of Divinity degree in 1883 from Wilberforce University.

Gaines became a bishop of the AME Church, and was a co-founder, treasurer and superintendent of Morris Brown College in Atlanta. He was vice president of Payne Theological Seminary in 1891. Gaines was involved in the foundation of Jackson Chapel. His great-niece Rev. Patricia Downs Wilder served as the pastor of the chapel by September 2017.

He published African Methodism in the South in 1890 and The Negro and the White Man in 1897.

== Personal life ==
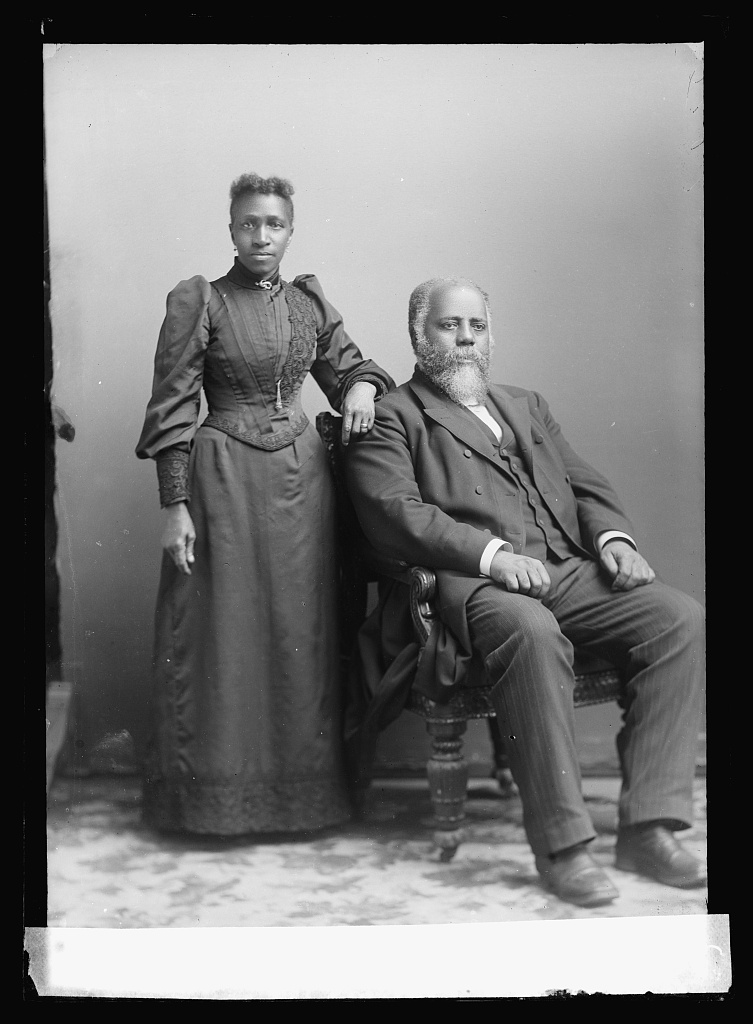
Bishop Wesley John and Julia Gaines

On the 20th or 30 August 1863, he married fellow slave, Julia A. Camper. In 1872, they had a daughter, Mary Louisa. Gaines died on January 12, 1912.

== Legacy ==
In 1893, the Providence AME Church at Elkridge Landing was rebuilt and named Gaines Chapel AME Church in recognition of the bishop's contribution to the movement. Nine other churches were named for him.
