= Yamacraw Village =

Public housing development in Savannah, Georgia, United States

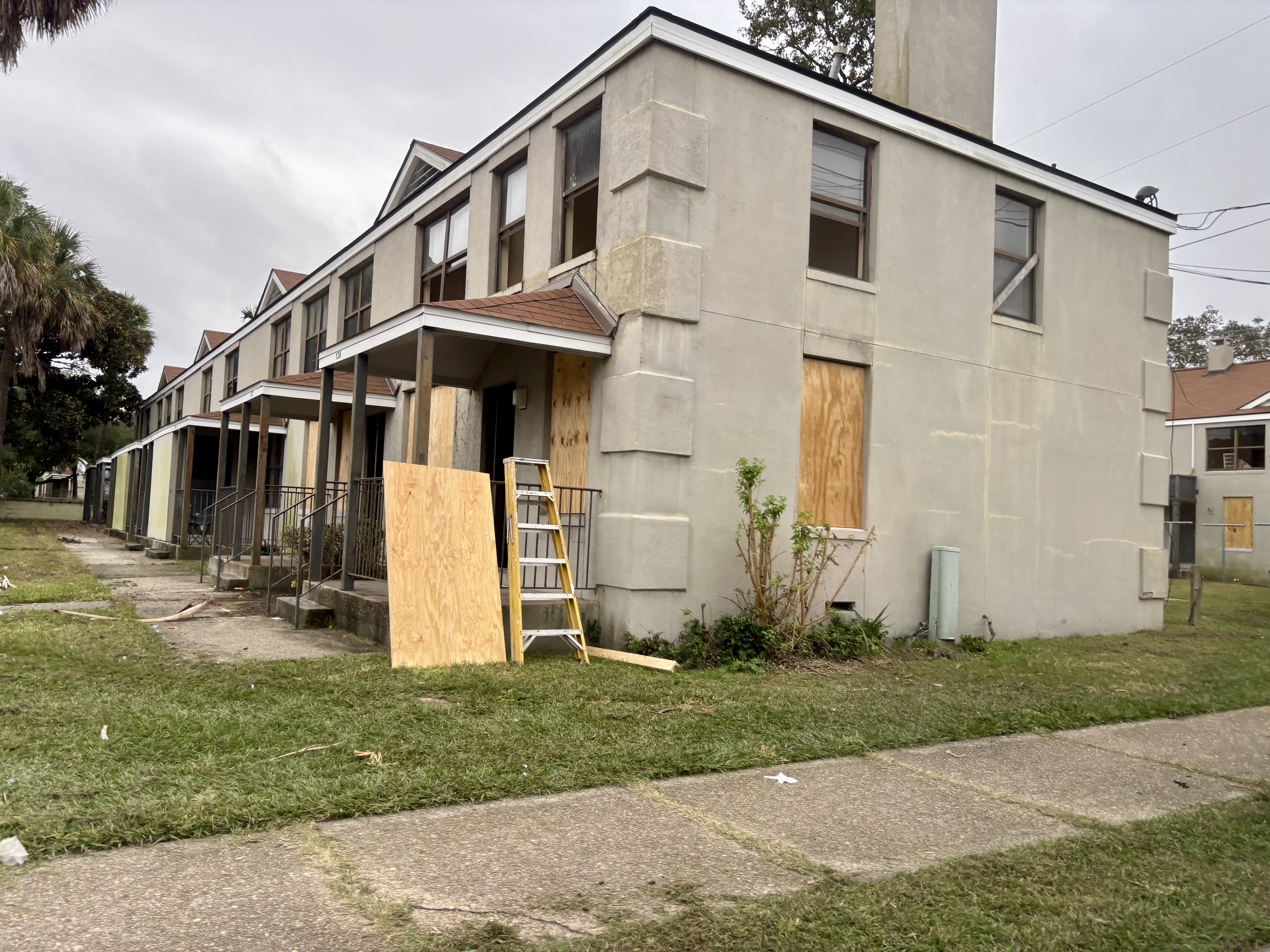
- Yamacraw Village units being boarded up in October 2025
- Interactive map of Yamacraw Village

General information
- Coordinates: 32°04′52″N 81°05′19″W
- Status: 315 units consisting of 42 two-story residential buildings

Construction
- Constructed: 1941

Other information
- Governing body: Housing Authority of Savannah
- Famous residents: James Weldon Johnson

Yamacraw Village is a historic public housing complex in Savannah, Georgia, known for its significance in local social history and current status as a site facing redevelopment and preservation concerns.

== History ==
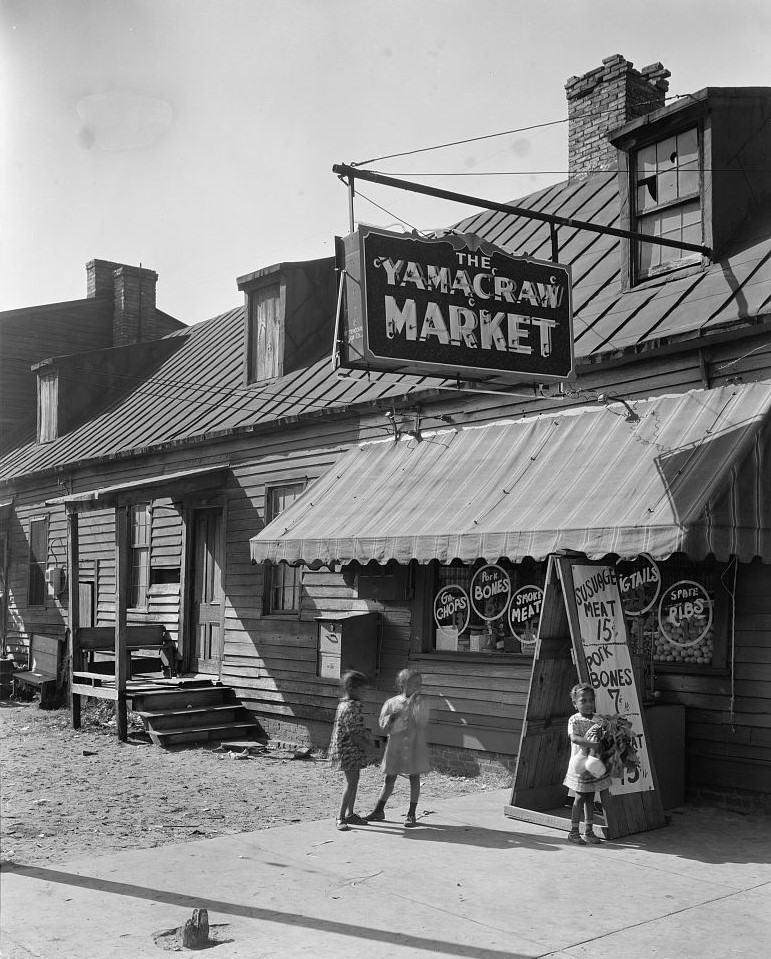
Yamacraw Market, Fahn Street, abt. 1940

Yamacraw is a historical neighborhood in Savannah, Georgia, associated with the African American community. Following the American Civil War, the area became a significant center for African American residents, influenced by the migration of various immigrant groups. The neighborhood derives its name from the Yamacraw, a Native American tribe that settled along the bluffs near the Savannah River in the early 18th century. In the early 20th century, the neighborhood gained recognition for its cultural contributions, inspiring numerous songs and poems. However, federal slum clearance policies targeted the area, resulting in the displacement of approximately 3,000 residents.

In 1941, Yamacraw Village was established as segregated public housing for Black residents, with the original administrative building designed to resemble a plantation house. Yamacraw Village represented one of the first federally funded public housing projects in Savannah, intended to replace substandard dwellings and improve living conditions for local residents.

Architecturally, Yamacraw Village consists of multiple blocks of two-story apartment units, constructed primarily with concrete block materials by local crews. Throughout its history, the site has undergone renovations, including updates completed in 1986, and was recognized as a vibrant cultural center for African American life in the city, immortalized in songs and poetry.

== Significance ==
The Chatham County-Savannah Metropolitan Planning Commission (MPC) had determined the village is eligible for the National Register of Historic Places. This triggers a Section 106 review, a federal process to consider the impact of a project on historic properties. Yamacraw Village holds substantial historical and cultural importance for Savannah. It is associated with early federal interventions in public housing, reflecting national trends in urban improvement during the mid-20th century. As the second federally funded housing project in the city and among the earliest in the nation, it marks a pivotal shift in the way municipal authorities approached housing for underserved communities.

== Current status ==
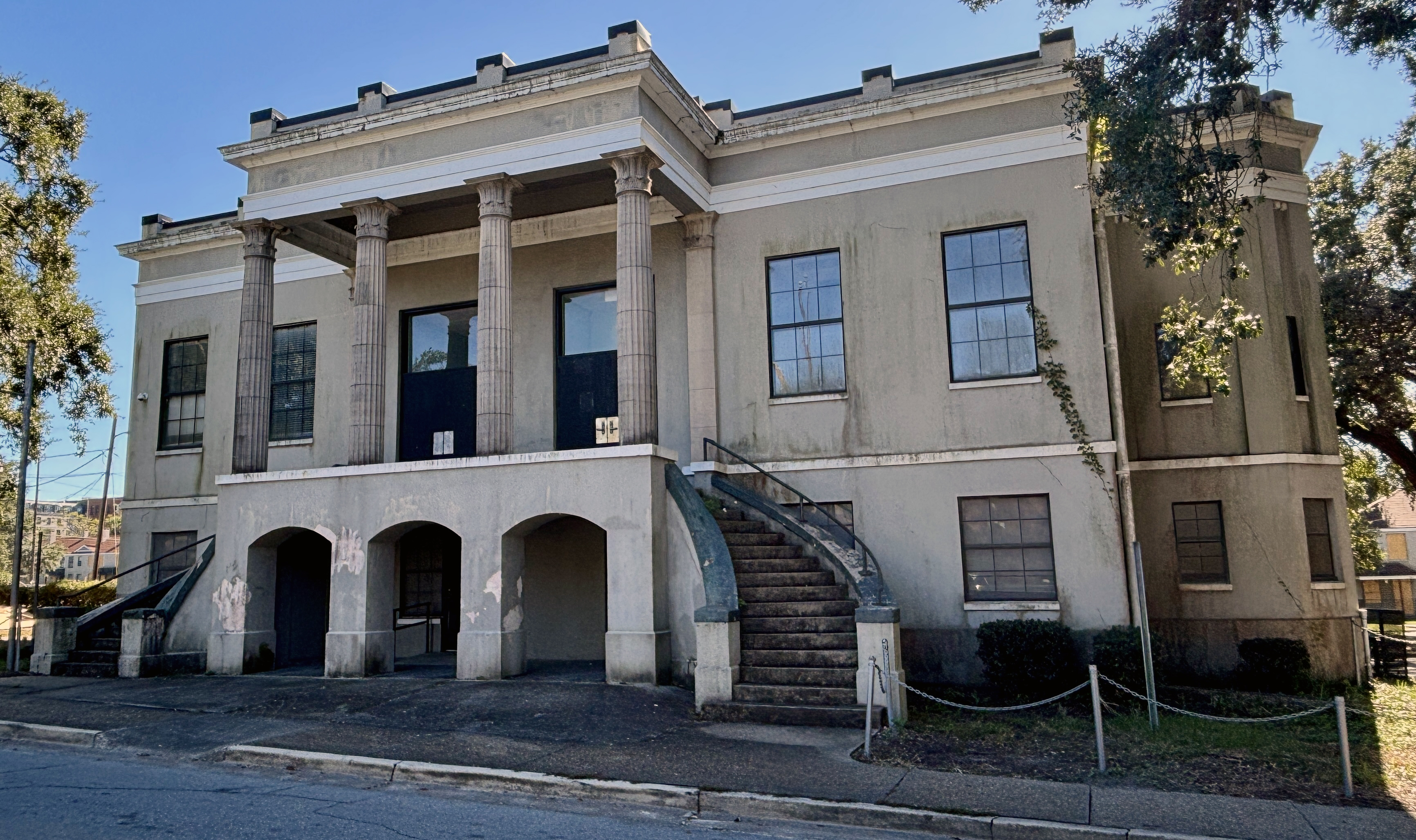
Old Administration Building designed as a plantation manor house

As of 2025, Yamacraw Village is marked by widespread vacancy and deterioration, with approximately 130 tenants remaining in a complex originally built to house hundreds. Many apartments are vacant, dilapidated, and boarded up; residents have reported chronic maintenance issues, including leaks, mold, and unreliable appliances. Over the last several years, the Housing Authority of Savannah initiated plans to demolish the village, citing the prohibitive cost of rehabilitation, estimated at $40 million.

Sarah Saadian, senior vice president of policy for the National Low Income Housing Coalition said, "The federal government really failed to invest in public housing, to keep it in good condition, and to keep those communities thriving and in many cases, actively contributed to those communities declining."

The demolition and redevelopment process requires approval from the federal Department of Housing and Urban Development (HUD), pending completion of local Section 106 reviews and public comment agreements. Community members have voiced strong opposition to losing the historic site, advocating for the inclusion of historical interpretation in any future development. Legal and bureaucratic delays have left residents facing uncertainty, with some undergoing eviction while others await clarity on relocation or redevelopment plans.

== See also ==
- First Bryan Baptist Church
- Andrew Bryan
