= John B. Hogg =

American engineer

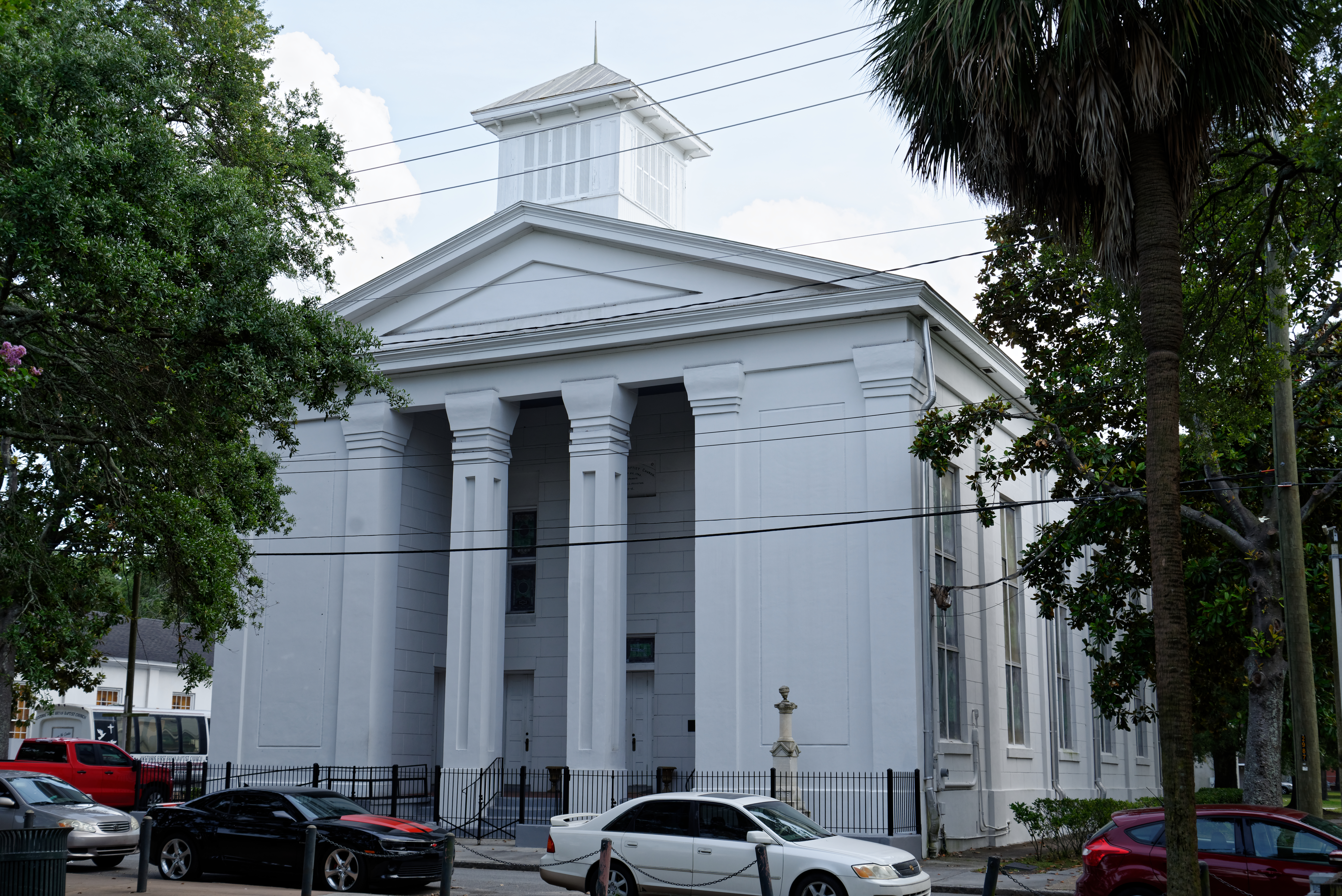
- Hogg designed the First Bryan Baptist Church, Savannah, Georgia
- Born: September 4, 1826; South Carolina, U.S.
- Died: March 26, 1888 (aged 61); Savannah, Georgia, U.S.
- Resting place: Laurel Grove Cemetery, Savannah, Georgia, U.S.

John B. Howard (born John B. Hogg; September 4, 1826 – March 26, 1888) was an American civil engineer and architect prominent in Savannah, Georgia, United States. He designed two of the city's churches.

== Life and career ==
John B. Hogg was born in South Carolina in 1826 to James E. Hogg and Harriet S. Vollotton. His father was a deacon of the First Baptist Church "until his old age."

After studying under Thomas Ustick Walter, in 1848 Hogg designed Trinity Methodist Church in Savannah's Telfair Square.

Hogg became a founding member of the Isle of Hope Methodist Church in 1851.

He married Georgia R. Lothropp, with whom he had two known children: Mary S. (born 1858) and William Carr (1860).

Hogg was listed in the 1860 Savannah census as being a peddler. The following year, he was recorded as being a surveyor. By 1867, he was appearing as the city's surveyor.

He was a private in the 26th Georgia Infantry.

In 1873, Hogg designed another of Savannah's churches, the First Bryan Baptist Church.

Hogg changed his last name to Howard in 1879. He appeared on city reports until 1887.

=== Selected notable works ===
- Trinity Methodist Church, Savannah, Georgia (1848)
- First Bryan Baptist Church, Savannah, Georgia (1873)

== Death ==
Howard died in 1888, aged 61. He was buried in Savannah's Laurel Grove Cemetery. His widow survived him by eight years and was interred beside him upon her death, aged 66.
