= William Gaines (minister and community leader) =

William Gaines (1824–1865) was a freed slave, minister, and community representative in Savannah, Georgia. He was one of the 20 Black church leaders—alongside Garrison Frazier, Ulysses L. Houston, and James D. Lynch—who met with Major General William Tecumseh Sherman and Secretary of War Edwin Stanton in Savannah on January 12, 1865 about 3 months before the end of the American Civil War. This meeting (what would later be called the "Savannah Colloquy") took place at the Green–Meldrim House, and their discussion directly led to Sherman's Special Field Orders No. 15, which included the famous Forty acres and a mule land allotment.

Gaines was born into slavery in Wilkes County, Georgia. He was owned by Robert Toombs, who served in the United States Senate, and his brother Gabriel Toombs. Gaines was freed by the Union Army during Sherman's March to the Sea.

Gaines was a preacher at the Methodist Episcopal (M.E.) Church (Andrew's Chapel). He later moved to the A.M.E. church with split off over the issue of slavery. As of 1865, he had ministered for 16 years and was 41 years old. Fellow A.M.E. church leader and bishop Wesley John Gaines was his brother. He was involved in the foundation of Jackson Chapel, and family members have continued to live in the area.
