= Georgia Rooks Dwelle =

African-American physician (1884–1977)

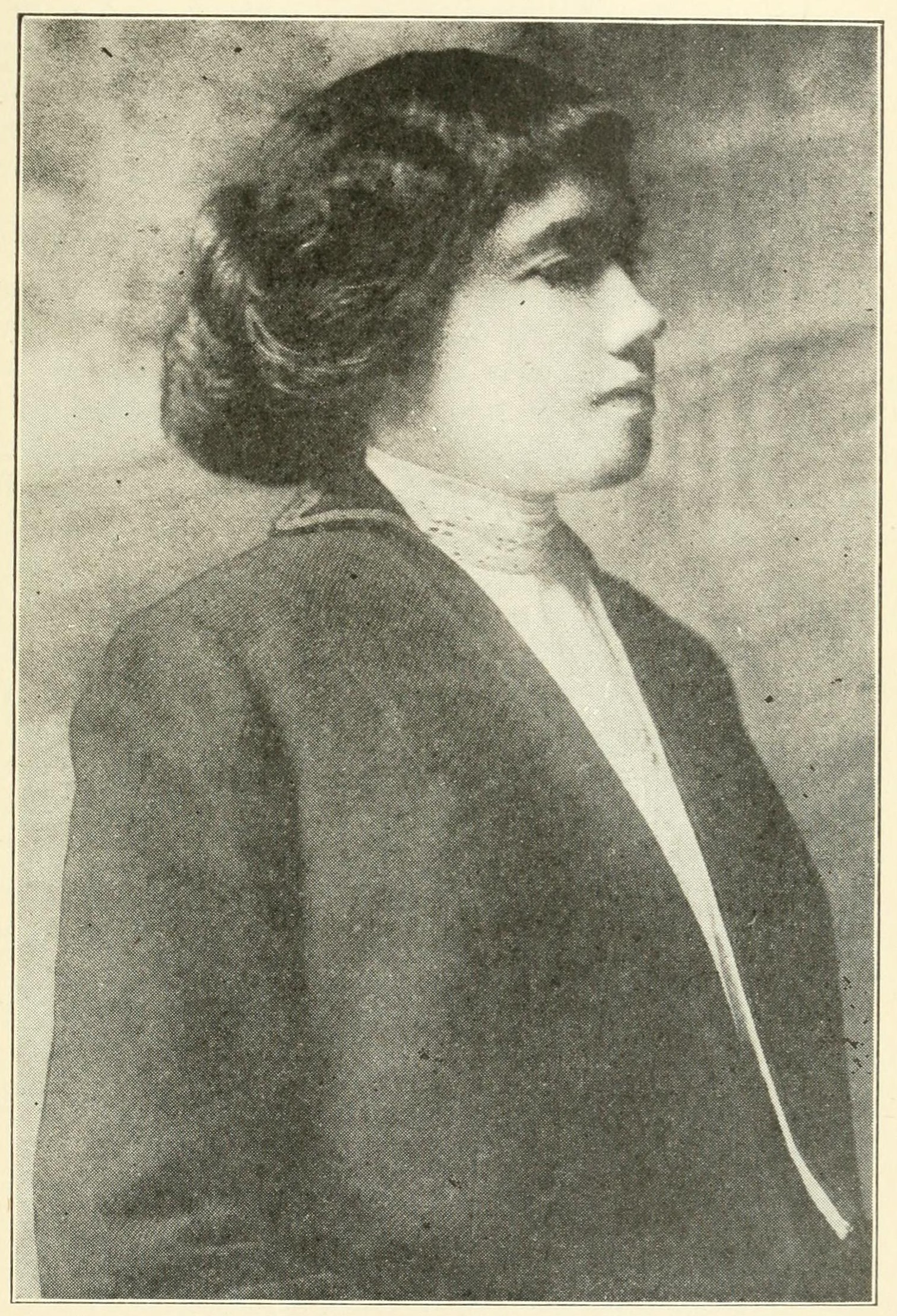
- Born: 1884; Atlanta, Georgia, US
- Died: 1977 (aged 92–93)
- Education: Spelman College; Meharry Medical College
- Occupation: Physician
- Medical career
- Field: Medicine
- Sub-specialties: obstetrics

Georgia Rooks Dwelle (1884–1977) was an African-American physician in Atlanta, Georgia who specialized in obstetrics and pediatrics. When Dwelle was licensed as a physician in 1904, she was one of only three African American women physicians in the state of Georgia. Dwelle began to practice medicine at a time when Jim Crow laws and social customs in Georgia required racial segregation in medical schools, health care facilities, and medical societies. To counter the lack of medical care for African-Americans in Atlanta, Dwelle opened the Dwelle Infirmary which was the first successful private general hospital for African Americans in Atlanta, and the first obstetrical hospital for African American women in Atlanta.

== Early life and education ==
Georgia Rooks Dwelle was born in 1884 in Albany, Georgia to former slaves Rev. George Henry Dwelle and Eliza (Dickerson) Dwelle. Her father purchased his own freedom. George Dwelle was a founder of the Missionary Baptist Convention of Georgia, and he was a trustee of Spelman Seminary in Atlanta. Initially, Dwelle followed her father's career interests and attended Walker Baptist Institute and later attended and graduated from Spelman Seminary. She was the first person from Spelman to attend a medical school. She graduated with honors from Meharry Medical College in Nashville, Tennessee in 1904. To overcome not having a pre-medical undergraduate course of study, she took extra courses at local colleges. Dwelle returned to Augusta, Georgia to sit for the Georgia State Medical Board Examination, and she received the top exam score that year and was recognized for her "unusual ability and thoroughness."

== Medical career ==
When Dwelle began to practice medicine in the early twentieth century, Jim Crow laws and social customs in Georgia required racial segregation in medical schools, health care facilities, and medical societies. Generally, medical professionals and patients thought that African American physicians were less qualified to provide medical to people of all races. African American physicians could not admit patients to a hospital to provide medical services to their private patients. To set up a successful medical practice to provide care to patients, Dwelle had to prevail over legal barriers and social conventions that assumed that she was less qualified than a white physician.

After passing Georgia State Medical Board Examination, Dwelle practiced in Augusta for two years. In 1906, she relocated to Atlanta to establish an obstetric and pediatric practice.

=== Dwelle infirmary ===
To provide hospital care for her patients, Dwelle rented rooms at 14 Boulevard Avenue in northeast Atlanta. Dwelle Infirmary was officially incorporated in 1920. The Infirmary operated out of the same rented rooms for twenty-seven years, until Dwelle retired in 1949.

=== Medical societies ===
Dwelle was a member of the National Medical Association (a professional organization for African American physicians) and chaired the Association's Pediatric Commission, and was appointed vice-president of the association. Dwelle was an officer of the John A. Andrew Clinical Society. She served on national and international committees, including the International Children's Fund Committee, the American Social Hygiene Association and the Child-Youth Commission of the United States.

== Later life and death ==
Dwelle retired in 1949 and moved to Chicago with her second husband. She died in 1977. She has been honored for her accomplishments with events including "Dr. Georgia R. Dwelle Appreciation Week" at Spelman College.

== See also ==
- Twentieth Century § Social change
