= Green–Meldrim House =

Historic house in Savannah, Georgia, US

- U.S. National Register of Historic Places
- U.S. National Historic Landmark
- U.S. National Historic Landmark District – Contributing property
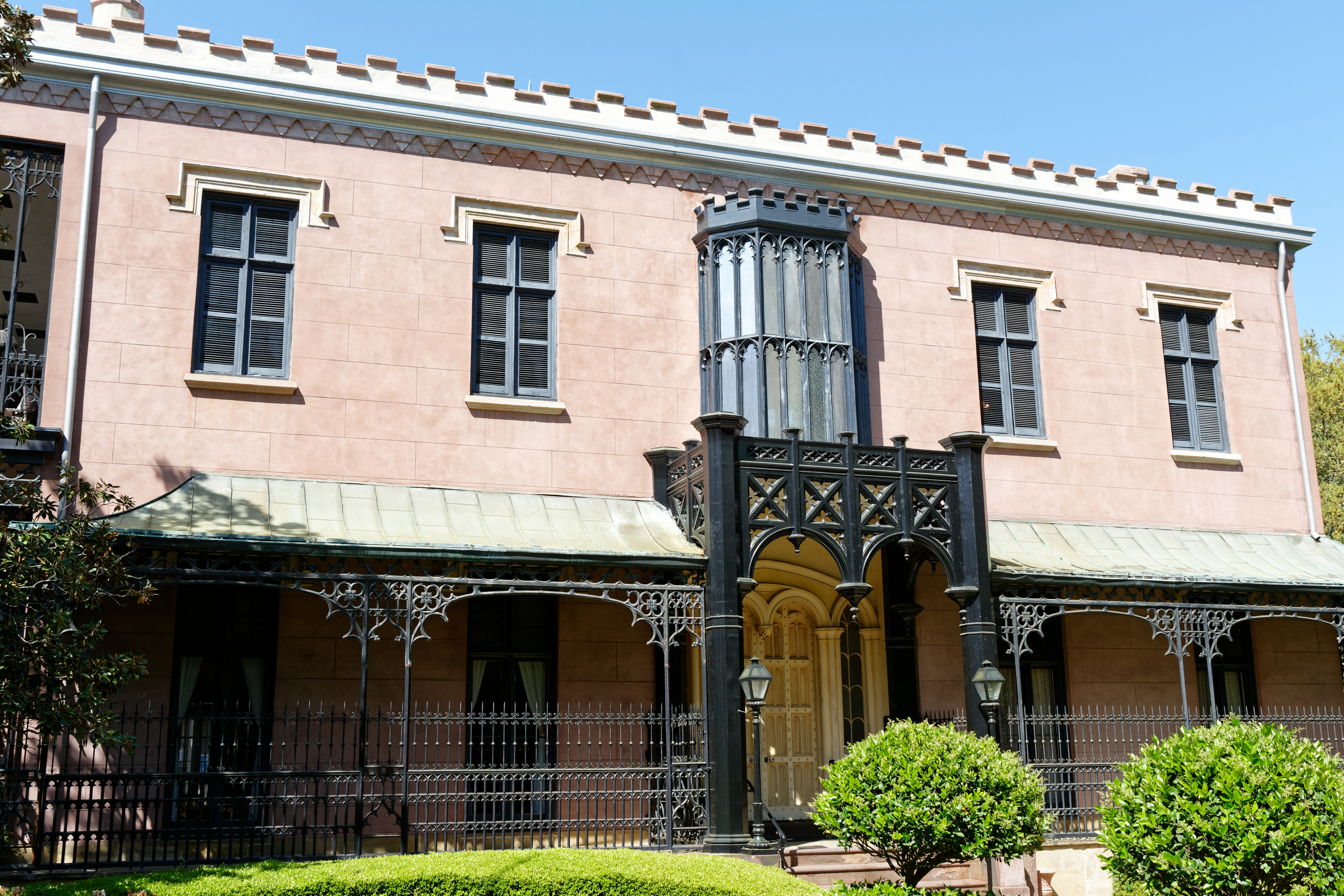
- Green–Meldrim House in the mid-20th century

- Location within Georgia Location within the United States
- Interactive map showing the location of Green-Meldrim House
- Location: Madison Square, Savannah, Georgia
- Coordinates: 32°4′26″N 81°5′41″W
- Built: 1853
- Architect: John S. Norris
- Architectural style: Gothic Revival
- Part of: Savannah Historic District (Savannah, Georgia) (ID66000277)
- NRHP reference No.: 74000664

Significant dates
- Added to NRHP: January 21, 1974
- Designated NHL: May 11, 1976

The Green–Meldrim House is a historic house at 14 West Macon Street, on the northwest corner of Madison Square, in Savannah, Georgia. Built in 1853, it was designated as a National Historic Landmark in 1976 as one of the American South's finest and most lavish examples of Gothic Revival architecture. The house is owned by the adjacent St. John's Episcopal Church, which offers tours and uses it as a meeting and reception space.

== Description ==
The Green–Meldrim House is located on the west side of Madison Square in central Savannah, at the southwest corner of West Harris and Bull Streets. West Macon Street, the house's address, is a spur street off Whitaker Street, which runs behind the property. The house's principal facade faces south, with a porch and garden facing the square. The house is among the best-known examples of the Gothic Revival style in the South, with a stuccoed brick exterior, cast-iron porch, oriel windows, and an imposing front cast-iron fence. The main entrance has an iron portico believed to be unique in the United States, with octagonal posts supported a pair of arches. A crenellated parapet rings the roof. The interior of the house, following a center-hall plan, retains original woodwork, plaster, and ironwork, the latter featuring a freestanding staircase.

== History ==
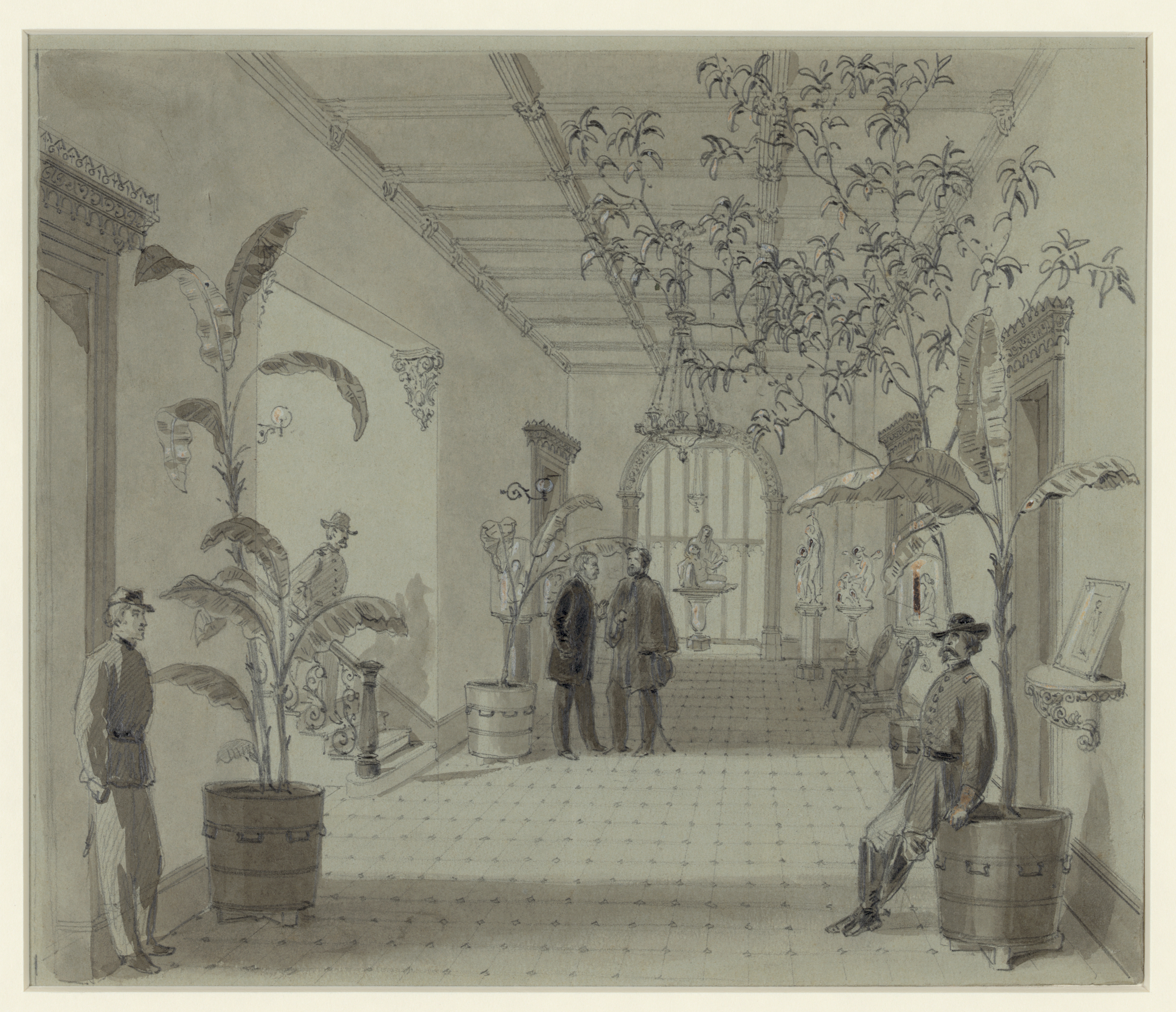
The Entrance Hall in 1864, when it was being used as General Sherman's Headquarters. A sketch by William Waud in 1864.

The house was designed and built in 1853 at a cost of $93,000 by the architect John Norris. The property's first owner was Charles Green, a wealthy cotton merchant and grandfather of the writer Julien Green.

After the Union troops captured Savannah in 1864, Gen. Sherman occupied the house and used it as a headquarters until the end of the Civil War. It was in this house in December 1864 that Sherman composed his famous telegram to President Lincoln, in which he communicated his desire to present to the President "as a Christmas Gift the City of Savannah, with one hundred and fifty heavy guns and plenty of ammunition, and also about twenty-five thousand bales of cotton"; the cotton belonged to Charles Green, the owner of the House. On January 12, 1865 Sherman and Secretary of War Edwin Stanton met with 20 Black Baptist and Methodist ministers—including Garrison Frazier, Ulysses L. Houston, and William Gaines—in what would later be called the "Savannah Colloquy" at the house. Their discussion directly led to Sherman's Special Field Orders No. 15, which included the famous forty acres and a mule land allotment. James D. Lynch and Alexander Harris were also among the ministers who participated.

In 1892, local politician and judge Peter Meldrim purchased the property and lived in it a number of decades. In 1943, his heirs sold the house to St John's Church, which is located next door. In the 1950s, Savannah Landscape Architect Clermont Huger Lee provided period appropriate designs and planting plans for the garden. Tours of the house are given during the day, and the church uses it for wedding receptions and after-church events. At this time, none of the original furniture is on display at the house.

== Photos ==
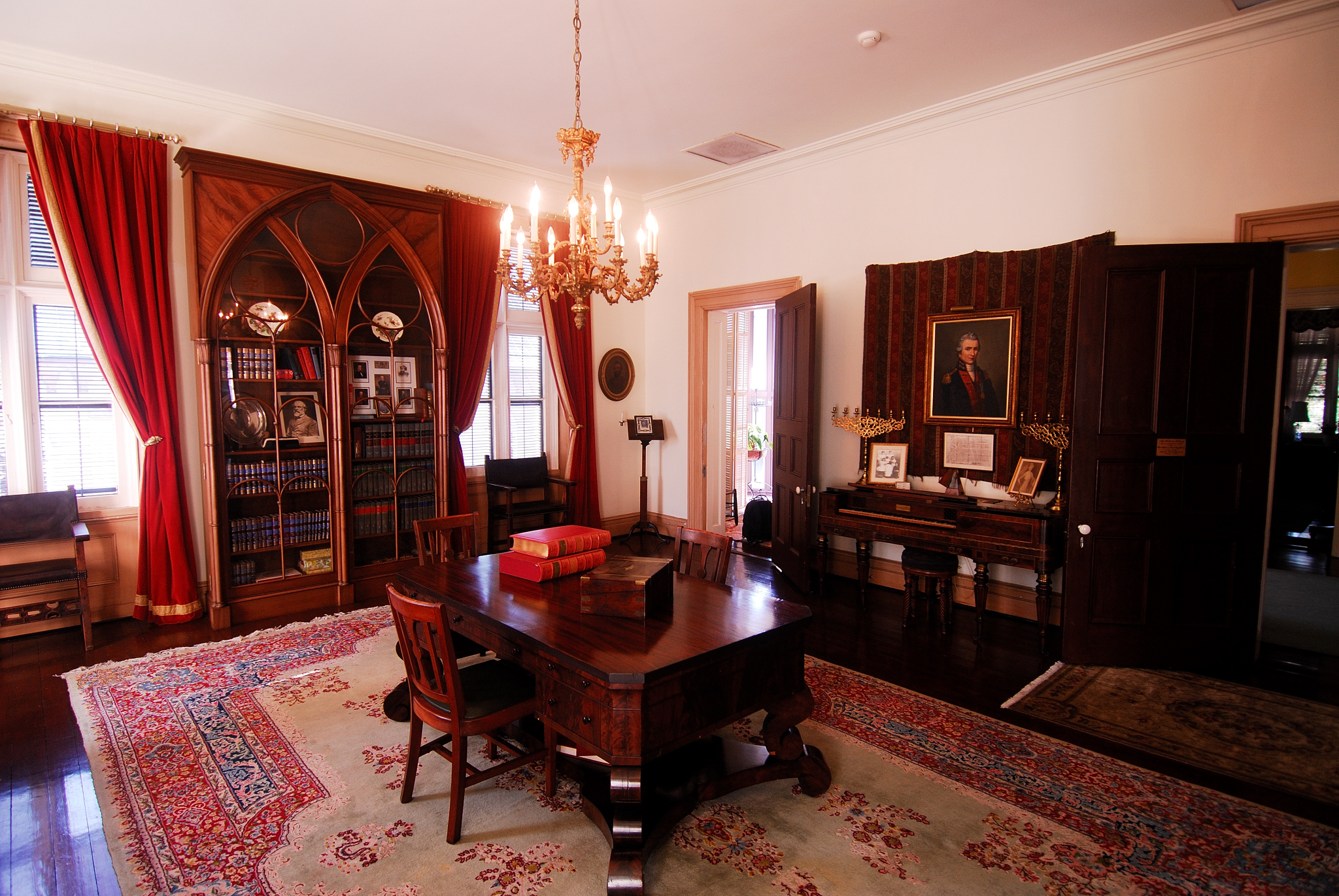
The library of the Green–Meldrim House

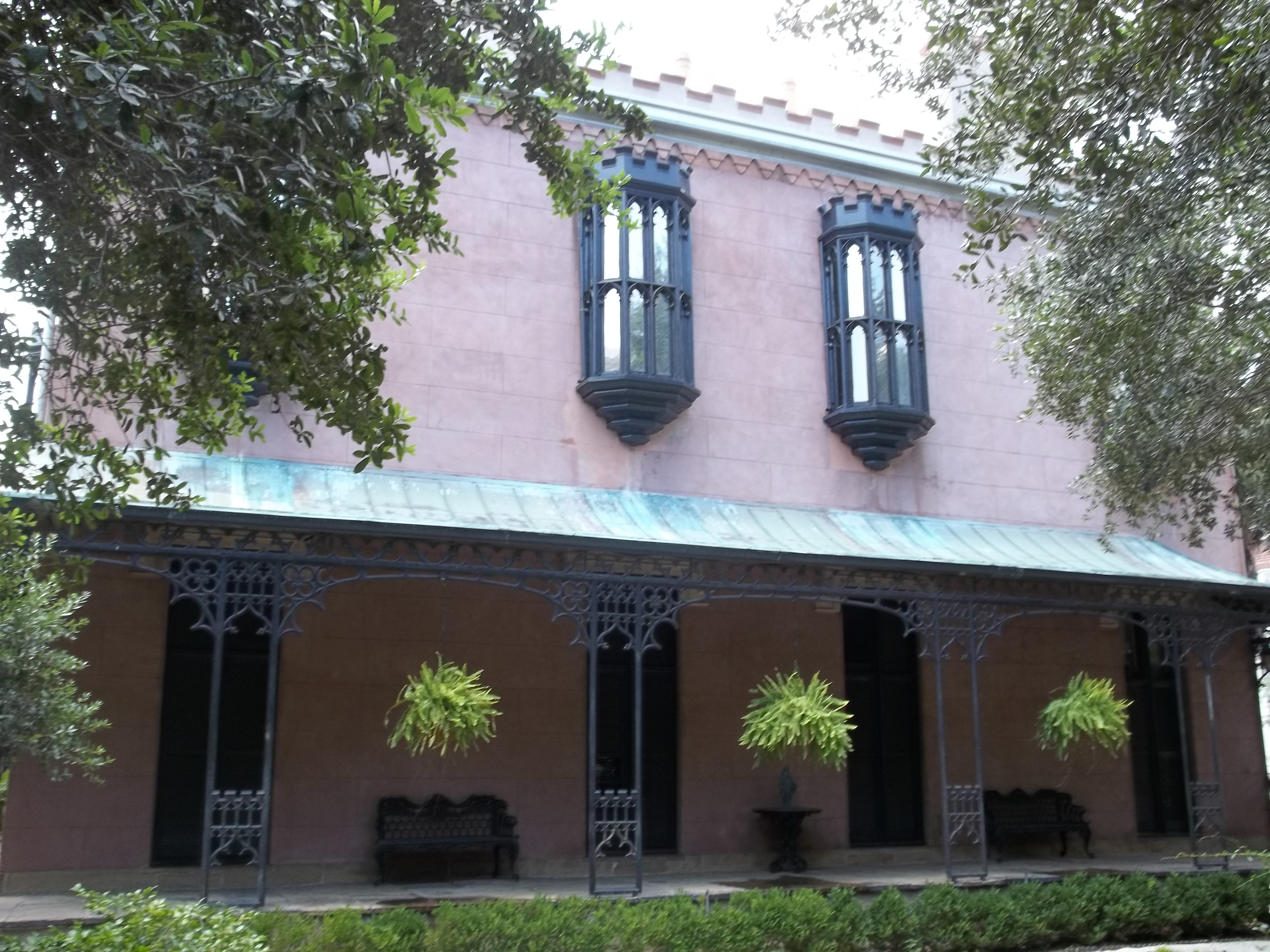
Side view

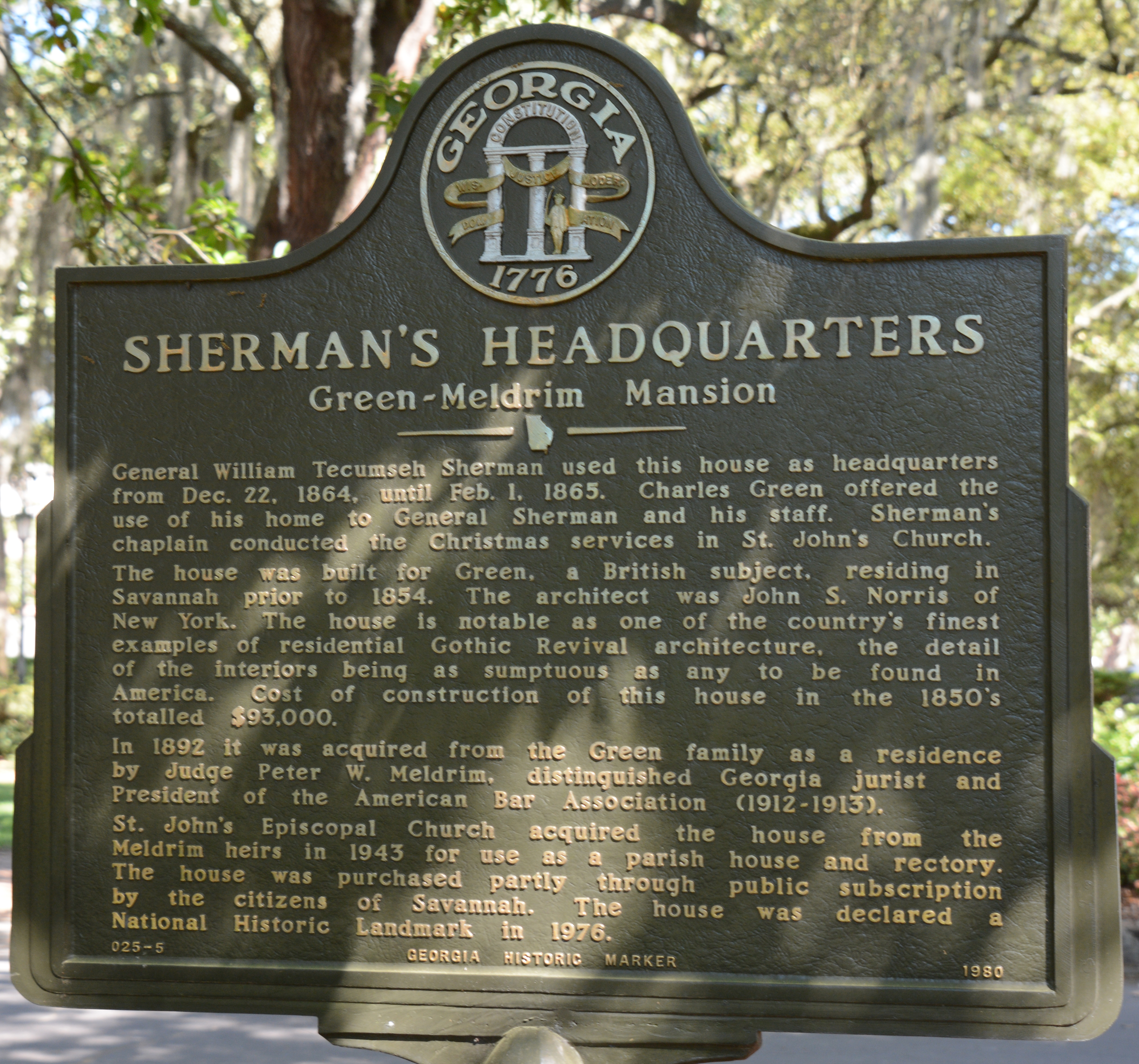
Historical marker

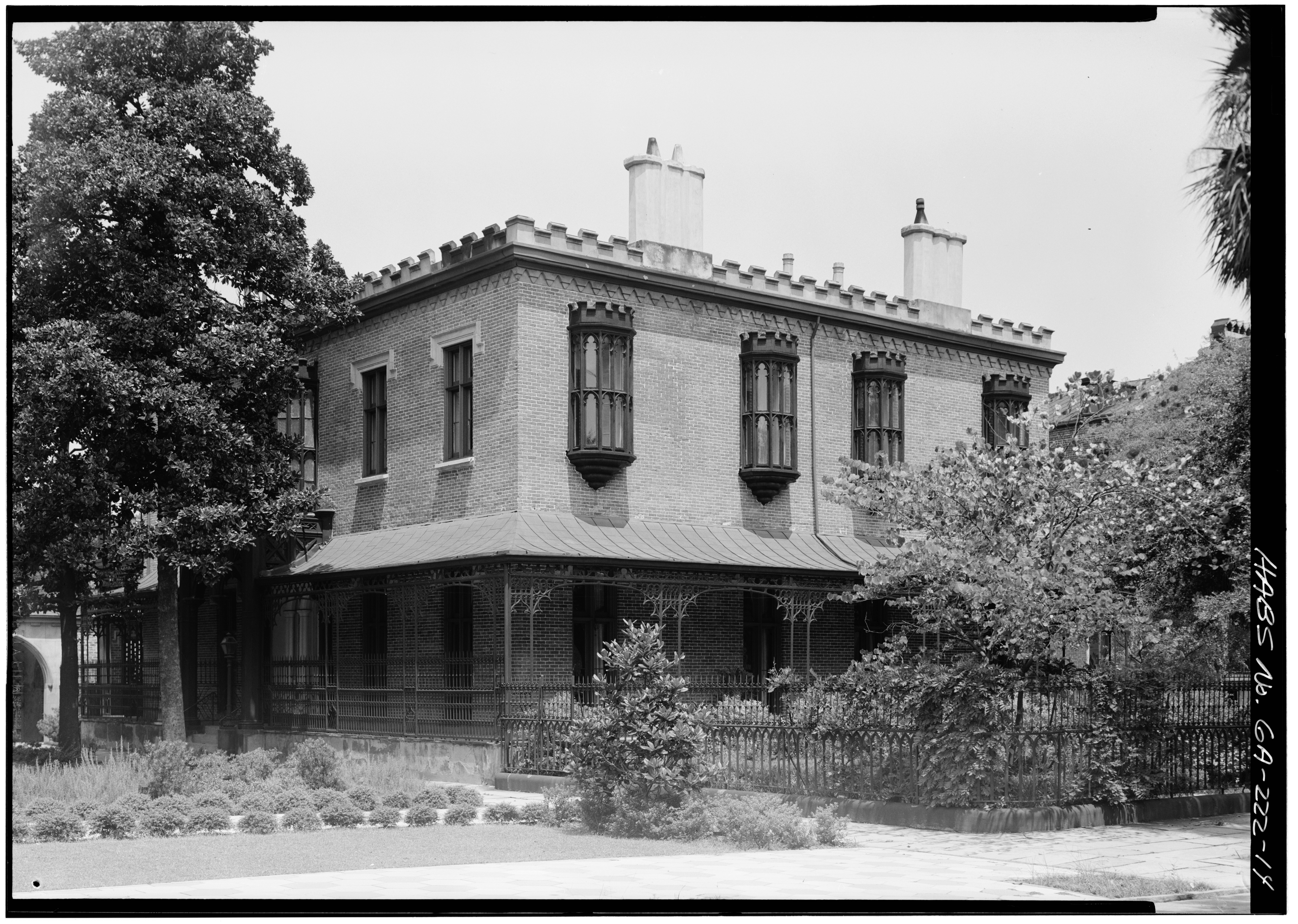
HABS photo

== See also ==
- List of National Historic Landmarks in Georgia (U.S. state)
- National Register of Historic Places listings in Chatham County, Georgia
