= Jackson Chapel =

Church in Georgia, United States

Coordinates: 33.73106°N 82.75543°W

Jackson Chapel is a historic A.M.E. church in Washington, Georgia. It is more than 150 years old. It located at 318 Whitehall Street, formerly known as Freedmen Road. The church was built in 1867 by former slaves including those owned by Robert Toombs. Family members of William Gaines and his brother Wesley John Gaines continue to be active in the church.
