= Lester's Florist =

Coordinates: 32.0569°N 81.1001°W

- Company type: Florist
- Industry: Floral design
- Founded: August 1971
- Founders: Lester Anthony
- Defunct: 2022 (4 years ago)
- Headquarters: 2100 Bull Street, Savannah, Georgia, U.S.
- Number of locations: 1
- Owners: Lester Anthony
- Website: www.lestersflowers.com

Lester's Florist was a florist located in Savannah, Georgia, United States. Established in August 1971, it provided floral arrangements for the presidential inauguration galas of consecutive U.S. presidents. Owned by Lester Anthony for all of its fifty years in business, it closed in February 2022.

== History ==
Lester Anthony began his floral-design business in the garage of Louise M. Jones in 1971 with, he states, $200 to his name. He remained there for five years.

After receiving a loan from Rev. Nathaniel Boles (1934–2021), minister at Shiloh Missionary Baptist Church in Savannah, Anthony moved into his first retail shop, at 2226 Bull Street, in 1976.

In January 1985, Anthony was asked to design a floral arrangement for the inauguration gala of the 40th United States president Ronald Reagan. He was asked to do the same in 1989 for Reagan's successor, George H. W. Bush. He attended both events, and was the only black designer on each occasion. At the request of the Society of American Florists, he and the other floral designers contributed to a story written for The Washington Post:

I came just for the experience of doing something different. I knew it would be something I wouldn't witness for a long time.

— Anthony, in an interview with The Washington Post's Carla Hall

In 1989, Anthony constructed his own store, a single-story building at the southeastern corner of Bull Street and 37th Street, a block north of his previous location. It cost around $500,000.

For the fiftieth anniversary of his business, on August 9, 2021, a celebration was held. Attendees included former mayor of Savannah Edna Jackson, while incumbent mayor Van Johnson awarded Anthony the Freedom of the City as a long-time Savannah Business Leader. Rev. Nathaniel Boles, who had given Anthony a loan in the early days of his career, died eight days later at the age of 86.

Anthony put his parcel of land on the market a couple of years before he decided to retire, but it did not sell until January 17, 2022.

== Lester Anthony ==
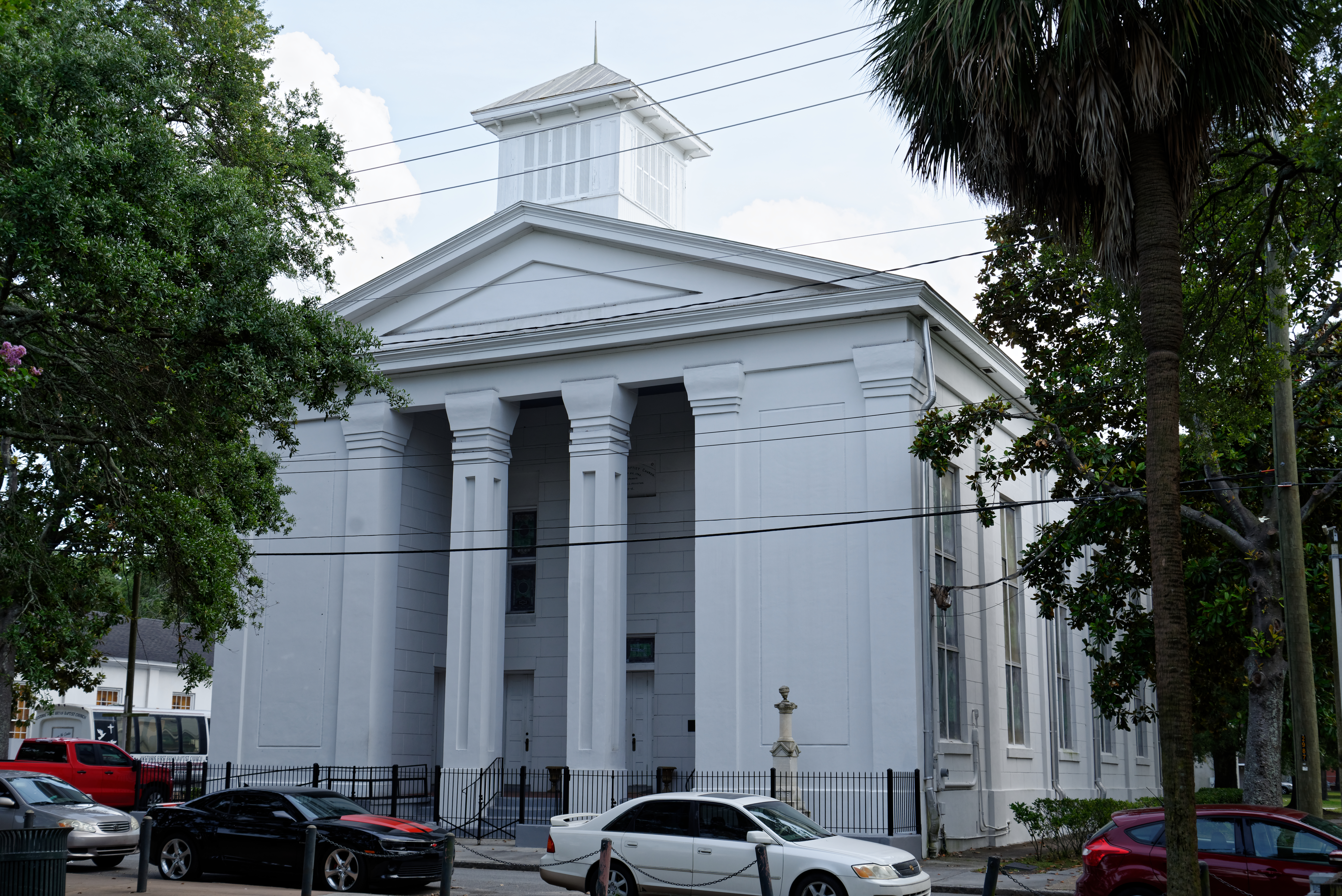
Anthony was music director at Savannah's First Bryan Baptist Church for 46 years

Lester Anthony was born in Savannah, Georgia, the third child of ten to James and Beatrice (1927–2000). His brothers were Dr. James Jr., Battiste and Leroy; his sisters Yvonne Smalls, Margie A. Colson, Catherine A. Moore, Louise, Eleanor and Jeanette A. Harper. He was later fostered by Mary Matthews (1922–2017). By the time of his 72-year-old mother's death, on February 29, 2000, all ten children were still living. She also had sixteen grandchildren and four great-grandchildren.

He graduated Alfred Ely Beach High School in 1971, the year he started his business.

Anthony attended the South Florida School of Floral Design in Lakeland, Florida, to learn the art of floral-design. He graduated in 1972.

In August 1985, he graduated with two degrees in floral design from the Hixson School of Floral Design in Lakewood, Ohio.

He received his master's degree in floral design in 1993 from the Phil Rulloda Southern California School of Floral Design in Anaheim, California.

Anthony's foster mother, Mary B. Matthews, died on November 15, 2017, aged 95. She is buried in Savannah's Laurel Grove South Cemetery, beside the grave of deacon James Barnes (1895–1981).

Anthony is a former minister of music at Savannah's First Bryan Baptist Church, having served in the role for 46 years.
