= Charles Elmore =

American historian

- Born: Savannah, Georgia, U.S.
- Education: University of Michigan
- Occupation: educator

Charles J. Elmore is an American scholar and jazz historian from Savannah, Georgia.

== Early background ==
Elmore, who was born and raised in Savannah, Georgia. He attended St. Pius X School, earned a BS Degree in biology and chemistry from Savannah State College, an MA degree in journalism and a Ph.D. in Higher Education Administration from the University of Michigan at Ann Arbor.

== Career ==
Elmore taught Savannah State University for more than 35 years, until his retirement in 2007.

=== Savannah State University ===
Under his leadership, Savannah State University's department of mass communications was accredited in May 2007 by the Accrediting Council on Education in Journalism and Mass Communications (ACEJMC) joining the University of Georgia in Athens as the only other mass communication programs in the state of Georgia with that accreditation. In 2013, he came out of retirement to lead the mass communications department at Savannah State University to ACEJMC reaccreditation from 2013 to 2019. He was a tenured professor of Humanities and the head of the Mass Communications Department. He also received the 1999 Governors Award in the Humanities from Roy Barnes, then governor of Georgia. In 1997–98 Elmore was named Savannah State University's Regents Distinguished Professor of Teaching and Learning. He was awarded the Richard R. Wright Award of Excellence - the highest award given by Savannah State University - in November 2015. In February 2016, he was named to the inaugural Hall of Fame of Savannah State University's Southern Regional Press Institute in its 66th year of existence.

Elmore was inducted into the Savannah Jazz Hall of Fame in 2020.

=== Jazz history ===
Elmore interest in jazz led him to collect recordings, research and write more than twenty articles on the history of this musical art form in Savannah.

=== Beach Institute Lecture Series ===
In 2008, he was a guest speaker at the King-Tisdell Cottage Foundation's Beach Institute Lecture Series. His presentations featured subjects such as the Free Blacks in Savannah and the History of Savannah's Beach Historic Neighborhood.

== Published books and articles ==
Elmore is the author of several historical monographs and books. They include:

- Athletic Saga of Savannah State College (1992).
- Richard R. Wright, Sr., at GSIC, 1891-1921 – A Protean Force for the Social Uplift and Higher Education of Black Americans (1996).
- An Historical Guide to Laurel Grove Cemetery South (1998).
- All That Savannah Jazz…From Brass Bands, Vaudeville, to Rhythm and Blues (1999, Savannah State University).
- The History of the First Bryan Baptist Church – 1788-2001: Oldest Continuous Black Baptist Church in America (July 2002).
- General Hunter’s Proclamation: The Quest for African American Freedom Before and During the Civil War, (June 2002 - National Park Service - Eastern National).
- Savannah, Georgia (March 2002, Arcadia Publishing – Black America Series).
- So Great A Cloud of Witnesses: The History of Butler Memorial Presbyterian Church (December 2006), Savannah, Georgia.
- Tell Them We are rising - The History of Savannah State University 1890-2015 (2015, Savannah State University).

Elmore has written more than fifty articles in refereed and non-refereed journals including the Georgia Historical Quarterly, Journal of Higher Education and the New Georgia Encyclopedia (online edition). His work has also been cited in the Washington Post, Savannah Morning News, and the Atlanta Journal Constitution.
