= Trinity Methodist Church (Savannah, Georgia) =

Historic church in Georgia, United States

Coordinates: 32.07851621°N 81.0952589°W

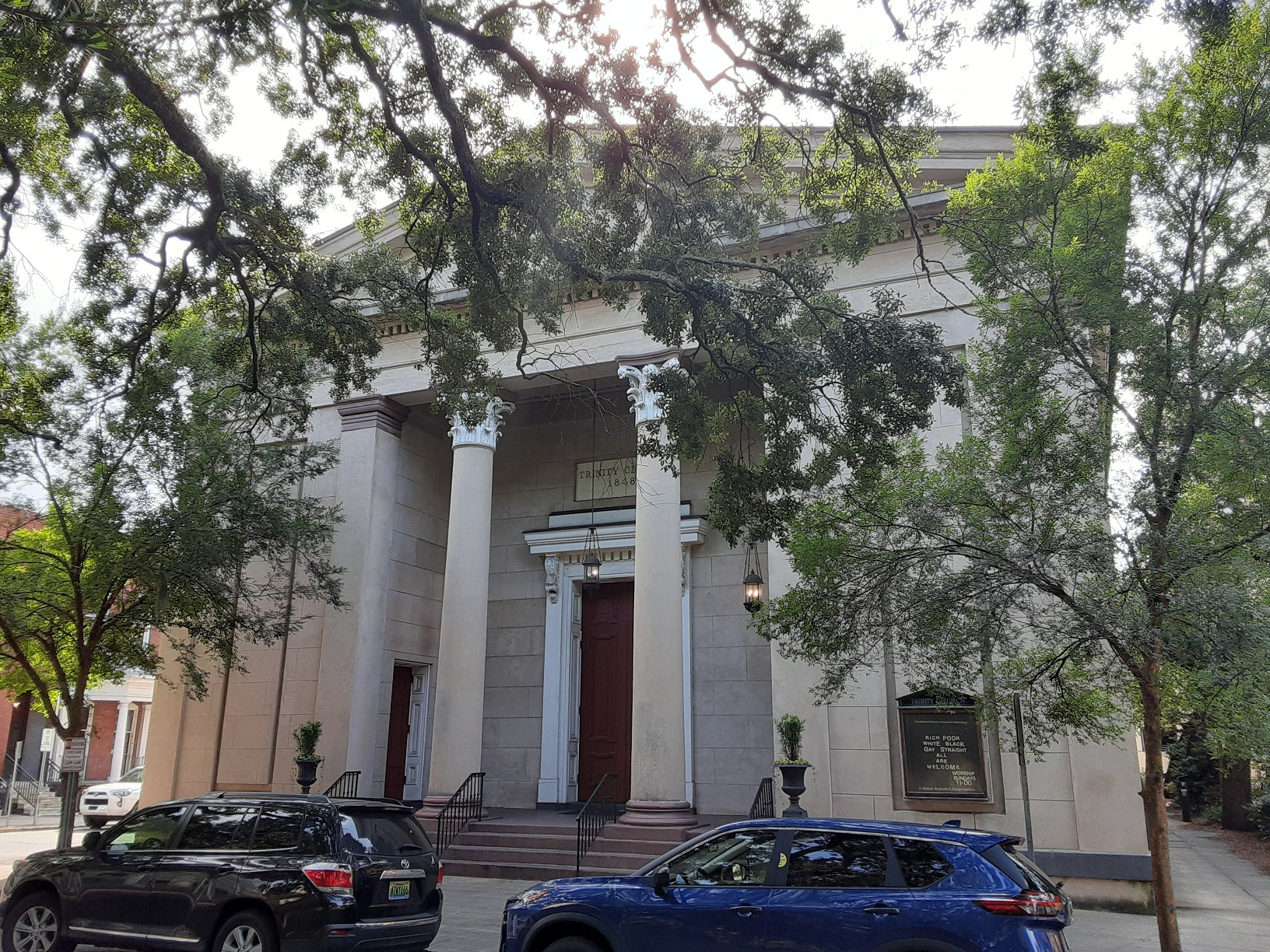
- The church in 2020
- Trinity Methodist Church
- Location: 127 Barnard Street; Telfair Square; Savannah, Georgia
- Country: United States
- Denomination: Methodism
- Website: https://trinity1848.org/

Architecture
- Architect: John B. Hogg
- Style: Corinthian
- Years built: 1848 (178 years ago)

Trinity Methodist Church, located in Savannah, Georgia, was built in 1848. It stands in the southwestern trust/civic block of Telfair Square.

The trustees of Wesley Chapel, named for Methodist preacher John Wesley and located on what was formerly known as South Broad Street (today's Oglethorpe Avenue), purchased the land on which the church stands in 1848 in order to build a sanctuary to house their growing congregation. Its foundation stone was laid on February 14, 1848. The Sheftall–Kent House, built by Levi Sheftall in 1762, was moved from the lot to 33–35 West Broad Street in the first part of the 19th century.

The first service was held in the Corinthian order structure, designed by John B. Hogg, in 1850.

In 1895, Robert McIntire donated funds for the construction of a Sunday School building. This building was replaced in 1927 by a modern, four-storey building. This building was destroyed by fire in 1991. The sanctuary was renovated in 1967, restoring the original 1848 design. In 2005, the church's exterior was restored, a project which won Historic Savannah Foundation's Award of Excellence.

The church's senior pastor is Ben Gosden.

== See also ==
- Buildings in Savannah Historic District
