= White Bluff, Georgia =

Coordinates: 31°59′16″N 81°07′43″W

- Interactive map of White Bluff, Georgia
- Country: United States
- State: Georgia
- County: Chatham
- Elevation: 26 ft (7.9 m)
- GNIS feature ID: 333409

White Bluff was a collection of communities—Nicholsonboro, Rose Dhu, Twin Hill, and Cedar Grove—located in Chatham County, Georgia, United States, and now part of Savannah. In 1940, as part of research published in Drums and Shadows: Survival Studies Among the Georgia Coastal Negroes, the total population was estimated at 400. The communities were centered on White Bluff Road, eight miles southeast of Savannah.

Drum and Shadows describes White Bluff as a "quiet Negro community" where "moss-hung oaks form a canopy and cast filigreed shadows" upon the community's main road. Many of its older (as of 1940) inhabitants were former slaves on a large plantation on St. Catherines Island owned by Jacob Waldburg. They moved to White Bluff in 1868 after Waldburg reclaimed the island, which after the Civil War had been briefly reserved for freed slaves by General Sherman's Special Field Orders, No. 15.

According to the 1869 book Historical Record of the City of Savannah, the community at that time had two hotels and several summer homes. Additionally, the book states that in 1740, there had been a Dutch settlement at the location.

== External links and sources ==
- Public domain image from Drums and Shadows, via the Library of Congress
- Special Field Orders, No. 15, from the history dep't website of University of Maryland
- Nicholsonboro Church, from the history dep't website of Armstrong Atlantic State University
- Historic church gets grant for renovation (Internet Archive version here), a July 27, 1998 article from the Savannah Morning News
- Georgia's Coast in photographs and more
