= International Children's Fund =

The International Children's Fund is a charitable Christian organization based in Neenah, Wisconsin that focuses on aiding indigenous people in Africa.

== Organization History ==
The non-profit organization was founded in 1975 by theologian David Bruenning, who traveled internationally to train pastors in the Christian faith. He was introduced to local communities and felt the need to assist populations living in poverty. The organization relies on a network of pastors in local villages to identify the greatest needs in their immediate communities.

The International Children's Fund relies primarily on volunteers to carry out its work. Volunteers and Staff process more than $114 million in donated goods annually from American contributors, which are shipped to countries throughout the African continent. Because of its reliance on volunteers, the organization operates with low overhead. In 2024, more than 99.8% of revenue and support (excess of 119 million) has gone directly to program services.

== Donations ==
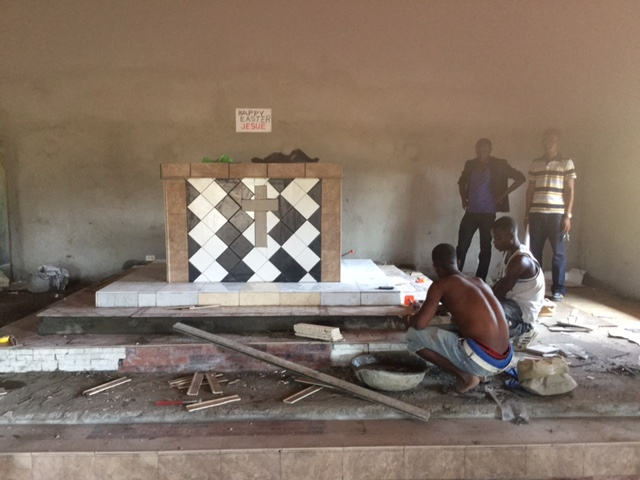
International Children's Fund flooring installation

The International Children's Fund receives a variety of items, including pharmaceuticals, medical supplies, clothing, printing presses and building materials. The International Children's Fund shipped more than 150,000 pounds of dehydrated food in 2025. More than 10 shipping containers are shipped to African countries, including Kenya, Uganda, Ghana, and Liberia each year. Water wells in Africa, India, and Pakistan 26 wells in 2025 and over 150 wells total. ICF provided over 1.6 Million Meals to the hungry in 2025.

While the International Children's Fund accepts donations from throughout the United States, it also works with local businesses on special projects. In 2014, the International Children's Fund received a donation of flooring materials from HJ Martin and Son, which was used to finish a variety of building projects in Liberia and Sierra Leone. Billboard posters from LaMar Advertising were donated and reused as waterproof building materials for some of these projects. Various other businesses Wisconsin Lions Club, Fox Valley Embroidery, Icon Print, Essity Paper and many others, The organization has also partnered with Rotary International and its Sharing Around (the World) Medical Project to distribute needed medical supplies.
