= Ulysses L. Houston =

U.S politician during the Reconstruction Era

Member of the Georgia House of Representatives from the Bryan County district
- In office 1868 – 1868; Original 33

Personal details
- Born: Grahamville, South Carolina
- Party: Republican

Ulysses L. Houston was a pastor and state legislator in Georgia. He was elected to the Georgia State Legislature in 1868, and was an influential organizer in the African-American community of Savannah, Georgia, during the mid-19th century.

He was born a slave in Grahamville, South Carolina, and was taken by his master Moses Henderson to Savannah, where he served as a house servant. According to the book Redeeming the South religious cultures and racial identities among Southern Baptists: "He learned to read from white sailors while he worked in the city's hospital and earned money by hiring out his time." Licensed to preach in 1855, he was the pastor of the Third African Baptist Church (later renamed the First Bryan Baptist Church) in Savannah, Georgia, a congregation of about 400, from 1861 to 1889. He was twice president of the black Baptist convention in Georgia.

During the American Civil War, Houston was one of the 20 Black church leaders who met with Secretary of War Edwin Stanton and Union General William Tecumseh Sherman on January 12, 1865. He was one of the 16 freedmen in this group. This meeting (which would later be called the "Savannah Colloquy") took place at the Green–Meldrim House, and their discussion directly led to Sherman's Special Field Orders No. 15, which included the famous Forty acres and a mule land allotment.

He was later one of the Original 33 African American legislators of the Reconstruction era in Georgia, expelled or forced to resign.

== See also ==
- First Bryan Baptist Church
- African American officeholders from the end of the Civil War until before 1900
