= Andrew Johnson =

President of the United States from 1865 to 1869

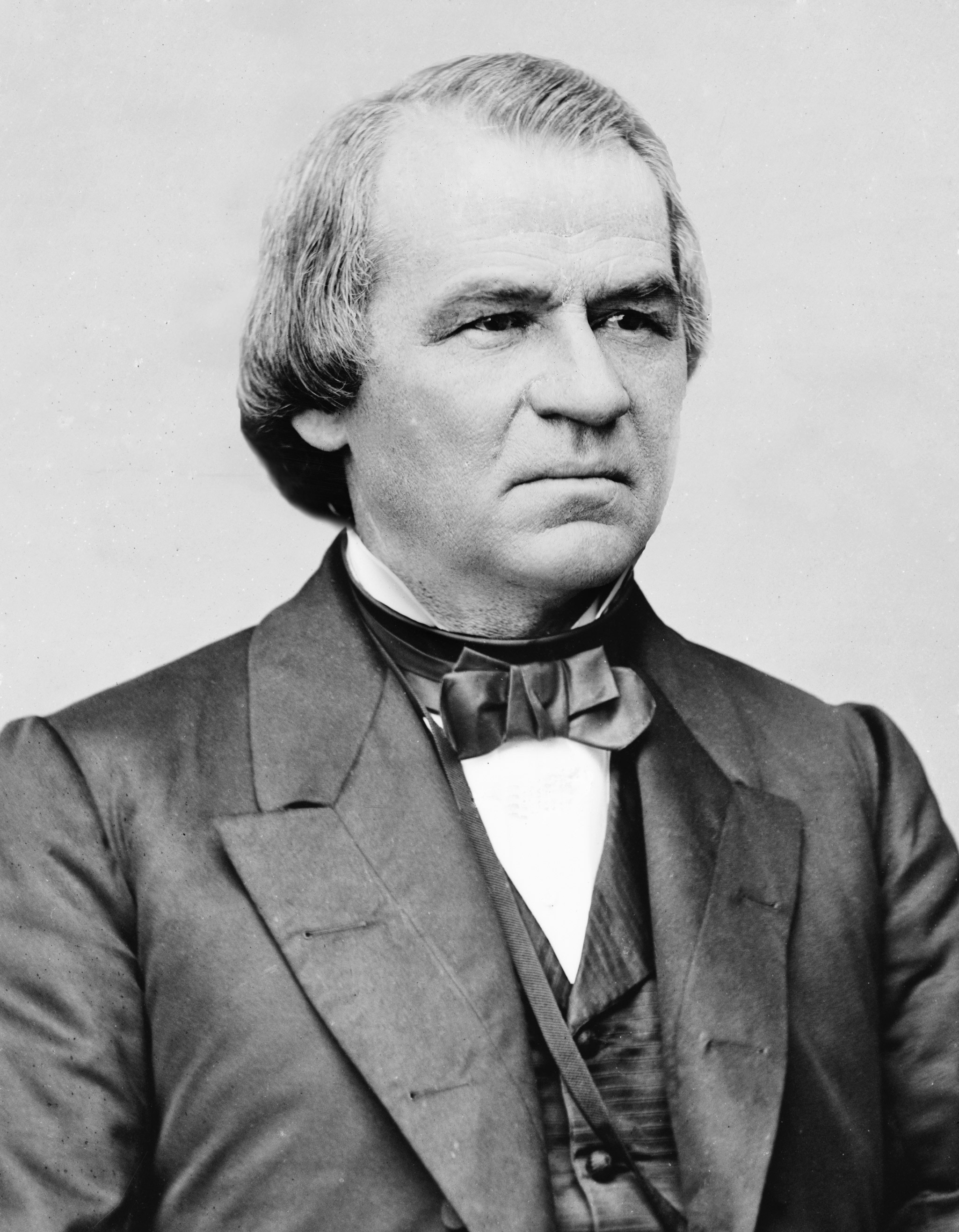
- Johnson, c. 1870–1875

17th President of the United States
- In office April 15, 1865 – March 4, 1869
- Vice President: Vacant (Note: Johnson was vice president under Abraham Lincoln and became president upon Lincoln's assassination. As this was prior to the adoption of the Twenty-fifth Amendment in 1967, a vacancy in the office of vice president was not filled until the next ensuing election and inauguration.)
- Preceded by: Abraham Lincoln
- Succeeded by: Ulysses S. Grant

16th Vice President of the United States
- In office March 4, 1865 – April 15, 1865
- President: Abraham Lincoln
- Preceded by: Hannibal Hamlin
- Succeeded by: Schuyler Colfax

United States Senator from Tennessee
- In office March 4, 1875 – July 31, 1875
- Preceded by: Parson Brownlow
- Succeeded by: David M. Key
- In office October 8, 1857 – March 4, 1862
- Preceded by: James C. Jones
- Succeeded by: David T. Patterson

Military Governor of Tennessee
- In office March 12, 1862 – March 4, 1865
- Appointed by: Abraham Lincoln
- Preceded by: Isham G. Harris (as Governor)
- Succeeded by: Parson Brownlow (as Governor)

15th Governor of Tennessee
- In office October 17, 1853 – November 3, 1857
- Preceded by: William B. Campbell
- Succeeded by: Isham G. Harris

Member of the U.S. House of Representatives from Tennessee's 1st district
- In office March 4, 1843 – March 3, 1853
- Preceded by: Thomas Dickens Arnold
- Succeeded by: Brookins Campbell

Personal details
- Born: December 29, 1808 Raleigh, North Carolina, U.S.
- Died: July 31, 1875 (aged 66) Elizabethton, Tennessee, U.S.
- Resting place: Andrew Johnson National Cemetery, Greeneville, Tennessee, U.S.
- Party: Democratic (from 1839)
- Other political affiliations: Independent (before 1839); Mechanics' (Working Men's) (1829–1835); National Union (1864–1867)
- Spouse: Eliza McCardle (m. 1827)
- Children: Martha; Charles; Mary; Robert; Andrew Jr.
- Parents: Jacob Johnson; Mary McDonough
- Profession: Politician; tailor

Military service
- Branch/service: United States Army (Union Army)
- Years of service: 1862–1865
- Rank: Brigadier General (as Military Governor of Tennessee)
- Battles/wars: American Civil War

Andrew Johnson (December 29, 1808 – July 31, 1875) was the 17th president of the United States, serving from 1865 to 1869. The 16th vice president, he assumed the presidency following the assassination of Abraham Lincoln. Johnson was a War Democrat who ran with Lincoln on the National Union Party ticket in the 1864 presidential election, coming to office as the American Civil War concluded. Johnson favored quick restoration of the seceded states to the Union without protection for the newly freed people who were formerly enslaved, as well as pardoning ex-Confederates. This led to conflict with the Republican Party-dominated U.S. Congress, culminating in his impeachment by the House of Representatives in 1868. He was acquitted in the Senate by one vote.

Johnson was born into poverty and never attended school. He was apprenticed as a tailor and worked in several frontier towns before settling in Greeneville, Tennessee, serving as an alderman and mayor before being elected to the Tennessee House of Representatives in 1835. After briefly serving in the Tennessee Senate, Johnson was elected to the U.S. House of Representatives in 1843, where he served five two-year terms. He was the governor of Tennessee for four years, and was elected by the legislature to the U.S. Senate in 1857. During his congressional service, he sought passage of the Homestead Bill, which was enacted soon after he left his Senate seat. In February 1861, slave states in the Southern U.S., including Tennessee, seceded to form the Confederate States of America, but Johnson remained firmly with the Union. He was the only senator from a Confederate state who did not promptly resign his seat upon learning of his state's secession. In 1862, Lincoln appointed him as Military Governor of Tennessee after most of it had been retaken. Johnson was a logical choice as Lincoln's running mate in 1864 because Lincoln wanted to send a message of national unity in his re-election campaign. Following their victory, Johnson became vice president.

Johnson implemented his own form of Presidential Reconstruction, a series of proclamations directing the seceded states to hold conventions and elections to reform their civil governments. Southern states returned many of their old leaders and passed Black Codes to deprive the freedmen of many civil liberties, but Congressional Republicans refused to seat legislators from those states and advanced legislation to overrule the Southern actions. Johnson vetoed their bills, and Congressional Republicans overrode him, setting a pattern for the remainder of his presidency. (Note: Johnson saw 15 of his vetoes overridden by Congress, more than any other President.) Johnson opposed the Fourteenth Amendment to the U.S. Constitution, which gave citizenship to former slaves. In 1866, he went on an unprecedented national tour promoting his executive policies, seeking to break Republican opposition. As the conflict grew between the branches of government, Congress passed the Tenure of Office Act (1867), restricting Johnson's ability to fire Cabinet officials. He persisted in trying to dismiss the Secretary of War, Edwin Stanton, but ended up being impeached by the House of Representatives and narrowly avoided conviction in the Senate. He did not win the 1868 Democratic presidential nomination and left office the following year.

Johnson returned to Tennessee after his presidency and gained some vindication when he was elected to the Senate in 1875, making him the only former president to serve in the Senate. He died five months into his term. Johnson's strong opposition to federally guaranteed rights for African Americans is widely criticized, and historians have consistently ranked him as one of the worst U.S. presidents.

== Early life ==
=== Childhood ===
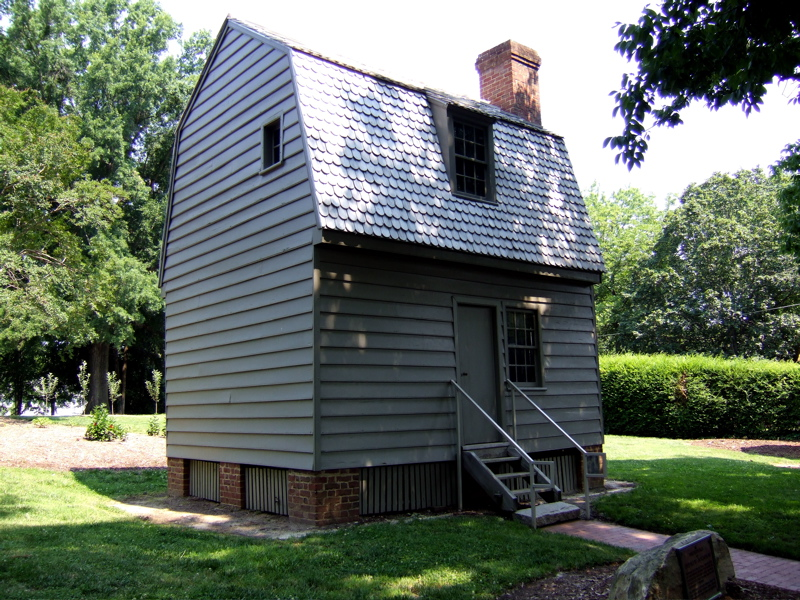
Johnson's birthplace and childhood home, located at the Mordecai Historic Park in Raleigh, North Carolina

Andrew Johnson was born in Raleigh, North Carolina, on December 29, 1808, to Jacob Johnson and Mary ("Polly") McDonough, a laundress. He was of English, Scots-Irish, and Scottish ancestry. He had a brother, William, four years his senior, and an older sister Elizabeth, who died in childhood. Johnson's birth in a two-room shack was a political asset in the mid-19th century, and he frequently reminded voters of his humble origins. Jacob Johnson was a poor man, as had been his father, William Johnson, but he became town constable of Raleigh before marrying and starting a family. Jacob Johnson had been a porter for the State Bank of North Carolina, appointed by William Polk, a relative of President James K. Polk. Both Jacob and Mary were illiterate, and had worked as tavern servants, while Johnson never attended school and grew up in poverty. Jacob died of an apparent heart attack while ringing the town bell, shortly after rescuing three drowning men, when his son Andrew was three. Polly Johnson worked as a washerwoman and became the sole support of her family. Her occupation was then looked down on, as it often took her into other homes unaccompanied. Since Andrew did not resemble either of his siblings, there are rumors that he may have been fathered by another man. Polly Johnson eventually remarried to a man named Turner Doughtry, who was as poor as she was.

Johnson's mother apprenticed her son William to a tailor, James Selby. Andrew also became an apprentice in Selby's shop at age ten and was legally bound to serve until his 21st birthday. Johnson lived with his mother for part of his service, and one of Selby's employees taught him rudimentary literacy skills. His education was augmented by citizens who would come to Selby's shop to read to the tailors as they worked. Even before he became an apprentice, Johnson came to listen. The readings instilled in him a lifelong love of learning, and his biographer Annette Gordon-Reed suggests that Johnson, later a gifted public speaker, learned the art as he threaded needles and cut cloth.

Johnson was unhappy at James Selby's, and after about five years, he and his brother ran away. Selby responded by placing a reward for their return: "Ten Dollars Reward. Ran away from the subscriber, two apprentice boys, legally bound, named William and Andrew Johnson ... [payment] to any person who will deliver said apprentices to me in Raleigh, or I will give the above reward for Andrew Johnson alone." The brothers went to Carthage, North Carolina, where Johnson worked as a tailor for several months. Fearing he would be arrested and returned to Raleigh, Johnson moved to Laurens, South Carolina. He found work quickly, met his first love, Mary Wood, and made her a quilt as a gift. However, she rejected his marriage proposal. He returned to Raleigh, hoping to buy out his apprenticeship, but could not come to terms with Selby. Unable to stay in Raleigh, where he risked being apprehended for abandoning Selby, he decided to move west.

=== Move to Tennessee ===
Johnson left North Carolina for Tennessee, traveling mostly on foot. After a brief period in Knoxville, he moved to Mooresville, Alabama. He then worked as a tailor in Columbia, Tennessee, but was called back to Raleigh by his mother and stepfather, who saw limited opportunities there and who wished to emigrate west. Johnson and his party traveled through the Blue Ridge Mountains to Greeneville, Tennessee. Andrew Johnson fell in love with the town at first sight, and when he became prosperous purchased the land where he had first camped and planted a tree in commemoration.

In Greeneville, Johnson established a successful tailoring business in the front of his home. In 1827, at the age of 18, he married 16-year-old Eliza McCardle, the daughter of a local shoemaker. The pair were married by Justice of the Peace Mordecai Lincoln, first cousin of Thomas Lincoln, whose son would become president. The Johnsons were married for almost 50 years and had five children: Martha (1828), Charles (1830), Mary (1832), Robert (1834), and Andrew Jr. (1852). Though she had tuberculosis, Eliza supported her husband's endeavors. She taught him mathematics skills and tutored him to improve his writing. Shy and retiring by nature, Eliza Johnson usually remained in Greeneville during Johnson's political rise. She was not often seen during her husband's presidency; their daughter Martha usually served as official hostess.

Johnson's tailoring business prospered during the early years of the marriage, enabling him to hire help and giving him the funds to invest profitably in real estate. He later boasted of his talents as a tailor, "my work never ripped or gave way". He was a voracious reader. Books about famous orators aroused his interest in political dialogue, and he had private debates on the issues of the day with customers who held opposing views. He also took part in debates at Greeneville College.

=== Slaves ===
In 1843, Johnson purchased his first slave, Dolly, who was 14 years old at the time. Dolly had three children—Liz, Florence and William. Soon after his purchase of Dolly, he purchased Dolly's half-brother Sam. Sam Johnson and his wife Margaret had nine children. Sam became a commissioner of the Freedmen's Bureau and was known for being a proud man who negotiated the nature of his work with the Johnson family. Notably, he received some monetary compensation for his labors and negotiated with Andrew Johnson to receive a tract of land which Johnson gave him for free in 1867.

In 1857, Johnson purchased Henry, who was 13 at the time and would later accompany the Johnson family to the White House. Ultimately, Johnson owned at least ten slaves.

Andrew Johnson freed his slaves on August 8, 1863; they remained with him as paid servants. A year later, Johnson, as military governor of Tennessee, proclaimed the freedom of Tennessee's slaves. Sam and Margaret, Johnson's former slaves, lived in his tailor shop while he was president, without rent. As a sign of appreciation for proclaiming freedom, Andrew Johnson was given a watch by newly emancipated people in Tennessee inscribed with "for his Untiring Energy in the Cause of Freedom".

== Political rise ==
=== Tennessee politician ===
Johnson helped organize a Mechanics' (Working Men's) ticket in the 1829 Greeneville municipal election. He was elected town alderman, along with his friends Blackston McDannel and Mordecai Lincoln. Following Nat Turner's Rebellion in 1831, a state convention was called to pass a new constitution, including provisions to disenfranchise free people of color. The convention also wanted to reform real estate tax rates, and provide ways of funding improvements to Tennessee's infrastructure. The constitution was submitted for a public vote, and Johnson spoke widely for its adoption; the successful campaign provided him with statewide exposure. On January 4, 1834, his fellow aldermen elected him mayor of Greeneville.

In 1835, Johnson made a bid for election to the "floater" (open) seat which Greene County shared with neighboring Washington County in the Tennessee House of Representatives. According to his biographer Hans L. Trefousse, Johnson "demolished" the opposition in debate and won the election with a near-two-to-one margin. During his Greeneville days, Johnson joined the Tennessee Militia as a member of the 90th Regiment. He attained the rank of colonel, though while an enrolled member, Johnson was fined for an unknown offense. Afterwards, he was often addressed or referred to by his rank.

In his first term in the legislature, which met in the state capital of Nashville, Johnson did not consistently vote with either the Democratic or the newly formed Whig Party, though he revered President Andrew Jackson, a Democrat and fellow Tennessean. The major parties were still determining their core values and policy proposals, with the party system in a state of flux. The Whig Party had organized in opposition to Jackson, fearing the concentration of power in the Executive Branch of the government; Johnson differed from the Whigs as he opposed more than minimal government spending and spoke against aid for the railroads, while his constituents hoped for improvements in transportation. After Brookins Campbell and the Whigs defeated Johnson for reelection in 1837, Johnson would not lose another race for thirty years. In 1839, he sought to regain his seat, initially as a Whig, but when another candidate sought the Whig nomination, he ran as a Democrat and was elected. From that time he supported the Democratic party and built a powerful political machine in Greene County. Johnson became a strong advocate for the Democratic Party. He was noted for his oratory in an era when public speaking both informed and entertained the public; people flocked to hear him.

In 1840, Johnson was selected as a presidential elector for Tennessee, giving him more statewide publicity. Although Democratic President Martin Van Buren was defeated by former Ohio senator William Henry Harrison, Johnson was instrumental in keeping Greene County in the Democratic column. He was elected to the Tennessee Senate in 1841, where he served a two-year term. He had achieved financial success in his tailoring business, but sold it to concentrate on politics. He had also acquired additional real estate, including a larger home and a farm (where his mother and stepfather took residence), and among his assets numbered eight or nine slaves.

=== United States Representative (1843–1853) ===
Having served in both houses of the state legislature, Johnson saw election to Congress as the next step in his political career. He engaged in a number of political maneuvers to gain Democratic support, including the displacement of the Whig postmaster in Greeneville, and defeated Jonesborough lawyer John A. Aiken by 5,495 votes to 4,892. In Washington, he joined a new Democratic majority in the House of Representatives. Johnson advocated for the interests of the poor, maintained an anti-abolitionist stance, argued for only limited spending by the government and opposed protective tariffs. With Eliza remaining in Greeneville, Congressman Johnson shunned social functions in favor of study in the Library of Congress. Although a fellow Tennessee Democrat, James K. Polk, was elected president in 1844, and Johnson had campaigned for him, the two men had difficult relations, and President Polk refused some of his patronage suggestions.

Johnson believed, as did many Southern Democrats, that the Constitution protected private property, including slaves, and thus prohibited the federal and state governments from abolishing slavery. He won a second term in 1845 against William G. Brownlow, presenting himself as the defender of the poor against the aristocracy. In his second term, Johnson supported the Polk administration's decision to fight the Mexican War, seen by some Northerners as an attempt to gain territory to expand slavery westward, and opposed the Wilmot Proviso, a proposal to ban slavery in any territory gained from Mexico. He introduced for the first time his Homestead Bill, to grant 160 acres (65 ha) to people willing to settle the land and gain title to it. This issue was especially important to Johnson because of his own humble beginnings.

In the presidential election of 1848, the Democrats split over the slavery issue, and abolitionists formed the Free Soil Party, with former president Van Buren as their nominee. Johnson supported the Democratic candidate, former Michigan senator Lewis Cass. With the party split, Whig nominee General Zachary Taylor was easily victorious, and carried Tennessee. Johnson's relations with Polk remained poor; the President recorded of his final New Year's reception in 1849 that:

Among the visitors I observed in the crowd today was Hon. Andrew Johnson of the Ho. Repts. [House of Representatives] Though he represents a Democratic District in Tennessee (my own State) this is the first time I have seen him during the present session of Congress. Professing to be a Democrat, he has been politically, if not personally hostile to me during my whole term. He is very vindictive and perverse in his temper and conduct. If he had the manliness and independence to declare his opposition openly, he knows he could not be elected by his constituents. I am not aware that I have ever given him cause for offense.

Johnson, due to national interest in new railroad construction and in response to the need for better transportation in his own district, also supported government assistance for the East Tennessee and Virginia Railroad.

During his campaign for a fourth term, Johnson concentrated on three issues: slavery, homesteads and judicial elections. He defeated his opponent, Nathaniel G. Taylor, in August 1849, with a greater margin of victory than in previous campaigns. When the House convened in December, the party division caused by the Free Soil Party precluded the formation of the majority needed to elect a Speaker. Johnson proposed adoption of a rule allowing election of a Speaker by a plurality; some weeks later others took up a similar proposal, and Democrat Howell Cobb was elected.

Once the Speaker election had concluded and Congress was ready to conduct legislative business, the issue of slavery took center stage. Northerners sought to admit California, a free state, to the Union. Kentucky's Henry Clay introduced in the Senate a series of resolutions, the Compromise of 1850, to admit California and pass legislation sought by each side. Johnson voted for all the provisions except for the abolition of the slave trade in the nation's capital. He pressed resolutions for constitutional amendments to provide for popular election of senators (then elected by state legislatures) and of the president (chosen by the Electoral College), and limiting the tenure of federal judges to 12 years. These were all defeated.

A group of Democrats nominated Landon Carter Haynes to oppose Johnson as he sought a fifth term; the Whigs were so pleased with the internecine battle among the Democrats in the general election that they did not nominate a candidate of their own. The campaign included fierce debates: Johnson's main issue was the passage of the Homestead Bill; Haynes contended it would facilitate abolition. Johnson won the election by more than 1,600 votes. Though he was not enamored of the party's presidential nominee in 1852, former New Hampshire senator Franklin Pierce, Johnson campaigned for him. Pierce was elected, but he failed to carry Tennessee. In 1852, Johnson managed to get the House to pass his Homestead Bill, but it failed in the Senate. The Whigs had gained control of the Tennessee legislature, and, under the leadership of Gustavus Henry, redrew the boundaries of Johnson's First District to make it a safe seat for their party. The Nashville Union termed this "Henry-mandering"; (Note: Wordplay on gerrymandering.) lamented Johnson, "I have no political future."

During this period, Johnson became a Freemason, initiated into Greenville Lodge No. 119 in Greenville, Tennessee.

=== Governor of Tennessee (1853–1857) ===
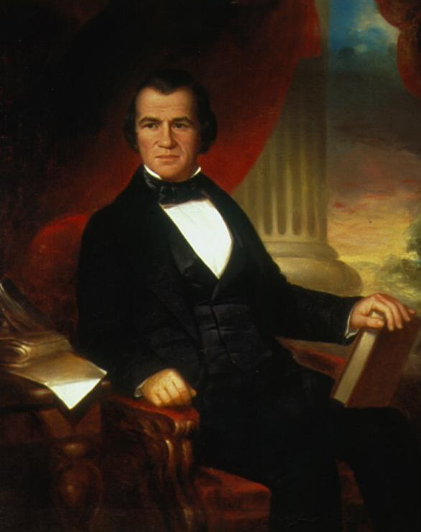
1856 gubernatorial portrait of Johnson by William Brown Cooper

If Johnson considered retiring from politics upon deciding not to seek reelection, he soon changed his mind. His political friends began to maneuver to get him the nomination for governor. The Democratic convention unanimously named him, though some party members were not happy at his selection. The Whigs had won the past two gubernatorial elections, and still controlled the legislature. That party nominated Henry, making the "Henry-mandering" of the First District an immediate issue. The two men debated in county seats the length of Tennessee before the meetings were called off two weeks before the August 1853 election due to illness in Henry's family. Johnson won the election by 63,413 votes to 61,163; some votes for him were cast in return for his promise to support Whig Nathaniel Taylor for his old seat in Congress.

Tennessee's governor had little power: Johnson could propose legislation but not veto it, and most appointments were made by the Whig-controlled legislature. Nevertheless, the office was a "bully pulpit" that allowed him to publicize himself and his political views. He succeeded in getting the appointments he wanted in return for his endorsement of John Bell, a Whig, for one of the state's U.S. Senate seats. In his first biennial speech, Johnson urged simplification of the state judicial system, abolition of the Bank of Tennessee, and establishment of an agency to provide uniformity in weights and measures; the last was passed. Johnson was critical of the Tennessee common school system and suggested funding be increased via taxes, either statewide or county by county—a mixture of the two was passed. Reforms carried out during Johnson's time as governor included the foundation of the State's public library (making books available to all) and its first public school system, and the initiation of regular state fairs to benefit craftsmen and farmers.

Although the Whig Party was on its final decline nationally, it remained strong in Tennessee, and the outlook for Democrats there in 1855 was poor. Feeling that reelection as governor was necessary to give him a chance at the higher offices he sought, Johnson agreed to make the run. Meredith P. Gentry received the Whig nomination. A series of more than a dozen vitriolic debates ensued. The issues in the campaign were slavery, the prohibition of alcohol, and the nativist positions of the Know Nothing Party. Johnson favored the first, but opposed the others. Gentry was more equivocal on the alcohol question, and had gained the support of the Know Nothings, a group Johnson portrayed as a secret society. Johnson was unexpectedly victorious, albeit with a narrower margin than in 1853.

When the presidential election of 1856 approached, Johnson hoped to be nominated; some Tennessee county conventions designated him a "favorite son". His position that the best interests of the Union were served by slavery in some areas made him a practical compromise candidate for president. He was never a major contender; the nomination fell to former Pennsylvania senator James Buchanan. Though he was not impressed by either, Johnson campaigned for Buchanan and his running mate, John C. Breckinridge, who were elected.

Johnson decided not to seek a third term as governor, with an eye towards election to the U.S. Senate. In 1857, while returning from Washington, his train derailed, causing serious damage to his right arm. This injury would trouble him in the years to come.

=== United States Senator ===
==== Homestead Bill advocate ====
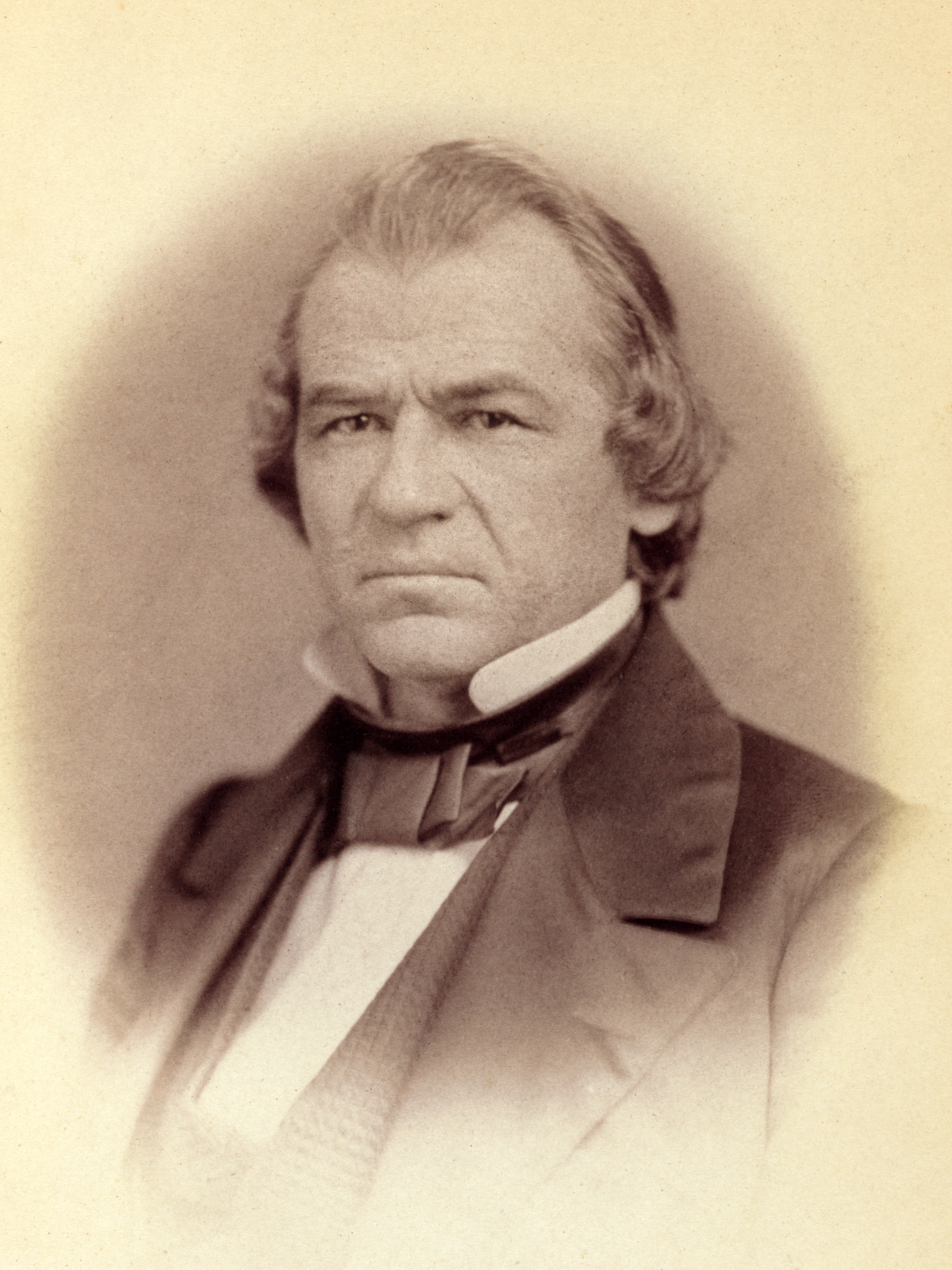
Official Senate portrait, 1859

The victors in the 1857 state legislative campaign would, once they convened in October, elect a United States Senator. Former Whig governor William B. Campbell wrote to his uncle, "The great anxiety of the Whigs is to elect a majority in the legislature so as to defeat Andrew Johnson for senator. Should the Democrats have the majority, he will certainly be their choice, and there is no man living to whom the Americans (Note: The Know Nothings, who were then formally known as the American Party.) and Whigs have as much antipathy as Johnson." The governor spoke widely in the campaign, and his party won the gubernatorial race and control of the legislature. Johnson's final address as governor gave him the chance to influence his electors, and he made proposals popular among Democrats. Two days later the legislature elected him to the Senate. The opposition was appalled, with the Richmond Whig newspaper referring to him as "the vilest radical and most unscrupulous demagogue in the Union".

Johnson gained high office due to his proven record as a man popular among the small farmers and self-employed tradesmen who made up much of Tennessee's electorate. He called them the "plebeians"; he was less popular among the planters and lawyers who led the state Democratic Party, but none could match him as a vote-getter. After his death, one Tennessee voter wrote of him, "Johnson was always the same to everyone ... the honors heaped upon him did not make him forget to be kind to the humblest citizen." Always seen in impeccably tailored clothing, he cut an impressive figure, and had the stamina to endure lengthy campaigns with daily travel over bad roads leading to another speech or debate. Mostly denied the party's machinery, he relied on a network of friends, advisers, and contacts. One friend, Hugh Douglas, stated in a letter to him, "you have been in the way of our would be great men for a long time. At heart many of us never wanted you to be Governor only none of the rest of us Could have been elected at the time and we only wanted to use you. Then we did not want you to go to the Senate but the people would send you."

The new senator took his seat when Congress convened in December 1857 (the term of his predecessor, James C. Jones, had expired in March). He came to Washington as usual without his wife and family; Eliza would visit Washington only once during Johnson's first time as senator, in 1860. Johnson immediately set about introducing the Homestead Bill in the Senate, but as most senators who supported it were Northern (many associated with the newly founded Republican Party), the matter became caught up in suspicions over the slavery issue. Southern senators felt that those who took advantage of the provisions of the Homestead Bill were more likely to be Northern non-slaveholders. The issue of slavery had been complicated by the Supreme Court's ruling earlier in the year in Dred Scott v. Sandford that slavery could not be prohibited in the territories. Johnson, a slaveholding senator from a Southern state, made a major speech in the Senate the following May in an attempt to convince his colleagues that the Homestead Bill and slavery were not incompatible. Nevertheless, Southern opposition was key to defeating the legislation, 30–22. In 1859, it failed on a procedural vote when Vice President Breckinridge broke a tie against the bill, and in 1860, a watered-down version passed both houses, only to be vetoed by Buchanan at the urging of Southerners. Johnson continued his opposition to spending, chairing a committee to control it.

He argued against funding to build infrastructure in Washington, D.C., stating that it was unfair to expect state citizens to pay for the city's streets, even if it was the seat of government. He opposed spending money for troops to put down the revolt by the Mormons in Utah Territory, arguing for temporary volunteers as the United States should not have a standing army.

==== Secession crisis ====
In October 1859, abolitionist John Brown and sympathizers raided the federal arsenal at Harpers Ferry, Virginia (today West Virginia). Tensions in Washington between pro- and anti-slavery forces increased greatly. Johnson gave a major speech in the Senate in December, decrying Northerners who would endanger the Union by seeking to outlaw slavery. The Tennessee senator stated that "all men are created equal" from the Declaration of Independence did not apply to African Americans, since the Constitution of Illinois contained that phrase—and that document barred voting by African Americans. Johnson, by this time, was a wealthy man who owned 14 slaves.

Johnson hoped that he would be a compromise candidate for the presidential nomination as the Democratic Party tore itself apart over the slavery question. Busy with the Homestead Bill during the 1860 Democratic National Convention in Charleston, South Carolina, he sent two of his sons and his chief political adviser to represent his interests in the backroom deal-making. The convention deadlocked, with no candidate able to gain the required two-thirds vote, but the sides were too far apart to consider Johnson as a compromise. The party split, with Northerners backing Illinois Senator Stephen Douglas while Southerners, including Johnson, supported Vice President Breckinridge for president. With former Tennessee senator John Bell running a fourth-party candidacy and further dividing the vote, the Republican Party elected its first president, former Illinois representative Abraham Lincoln. The election of Lincoln, known to be against the spread of slavery, was unacceptable to many in the South. Although secession from the Union had not been an issue in the campaign, talk of it began in the Southern states.

Johnson took to the Senate floor after the election, giving a speech well received in the North, "I will not give up this government ... No; I intend to stand by it ... and I invite every man who is a patriot to ... rally around the altar of our common country ... and swear by our God, and all that is sacred and holy, that the Constitution shall be saved, and the Union preserved." As Southern senators announced they would resign if their states seceded, he reminded Mississippi Senator Jefferson Davis that if Southerners would only hold to their seats, the Democrats would control the Senate, and could defend the South's interests against any infringement by Lincoln. Gordon-Reed points out that while Johnson's belief in an indissoluble Union was sincere, he had alienated Southern leaders, including Davis, who would soon be the president of the Confederate States of America, formed by the seceding states. If the Tennessean had backed the Confederacy, he would have had small influence in its government.

Johnson returned home when his state took up the issue of secession. His successor as governor, Isham G. Harris, and the legislature organized a referendum on whether to have a constitutional convention to authorize secession; when that failed, they put the question of leaving the Union to a popular vote. Despite threats on Johnson's life, and actual assaults, he campaigned against both questions, sometimes speaking with a gun on the lectern before him. Although Johnson's eastern region of Tennessee was largely against secession, the second referendum passed, and in June 1861, Tennessee joined the Confederacy. Believing he would be killed if he stayed, Johnson fled through the Cumberland Gap, where his party was in fact shot at. He left his wife and family in Greeneville.

As the only member from a seceded state to remain in the Senate and the most prominent Southern Unionist, Johnson had Lincoln's ear in the early months of the war. With most of Tennessee in Confederate hands, Johnson spent congressional recesses in Kentucky and Ohio, trying in vain to convince any Union commander who would listen to conduct an operation into East Tennessee.

=== Military Governor of Tennessee ===
Johnson's first tenure in the Senate came to a conclusion in March 1862 when Lincoln appointed him military governor of Tennessee. Much of the central and western portions of that seceded state had been recovered. Although some argued that civil government should simply resume once the Confederates were defeated in an area, Lincoln chose to use his power as commander in chief to appoint military governors over Union-controlled Southern regions. The Senate quickly confirmed Johnson's nomination along with the rank of brigadier general. In response, the Confederates confiscated his land and his slaves, and turned his home into a military hospital. Later in 1862, after his departure from the Senate and in the absence of most Southern legislators, the Homestead Bill was finally enacted. Along with legislation for land-grant colleges and for the transcontinental railroad, the Homestead Bill has been credited with opening the Western United States to settlement.

As military governor, Johnson sought to eliminate rebel influence in the state. He demanded loyalty oaths from public officials, and shut down all newspapers owned by Confederate sympathizers. Much of eastern Tennessee remained in Confederate hands, and the ebb and flow of war during 1862 sometimes brought Confederate control again close to Nashville. However, the Confederates allowed his wife and family to pass through the lines to join him. Johnson undertook the defense of Nashville as well as he could, though the city was continually harassed by cavalry raids led by General Nathan Bedford Forrest. Relief from Union regulars did not come until General William S. Rosecrans defeated the Confederates at Murfreesboro in early 1863. Much of eastern Tennessee was captured later that year.

When Lincoln issued the Emancipation Proclamation in January 1863, declaring freedom for all slaves in Confederate-held areas, he exempted Tennessee at Johnson's request. The proclamation increased the debate over what should become of the slaves after the war, as not all Unionists supported abolition. Johnson finally decided that slavery had to end. He wrote, "If the institution of slavery ... seeks to overthrow it [the Government], then the Government has a clear right to destroy it". He reluctantly supported efforts to enlist former slaves into the Union army, feeling that African-Americans should perform menial tasks to release white Americans to do the fighting. Nevertheless, he oversaw the recruitment of 20,000 black men into the United States Colored Troops.

== Vice presidency (1865) ==
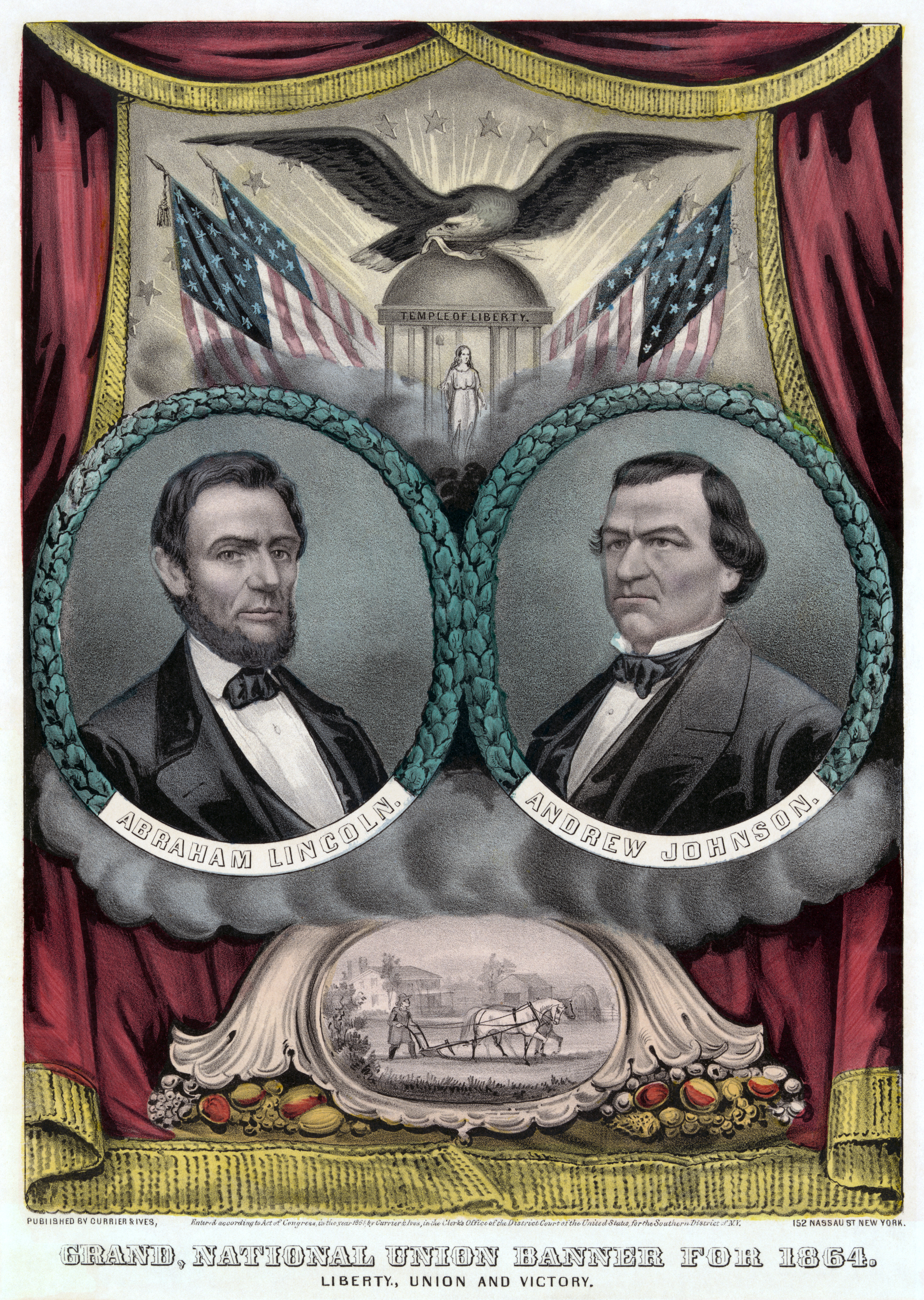
1864 poster for the Lincoln and Johnson ticket by Currier and Ives

In 1860, Lincoln's running mate had been Senator Hannibal Hamlin of Maine. Although Hamlin had served competently, was in good health, and was willing to run again, Johnson emerged as running mate for Lincoln's reelection bid in 1864.

Lincoln considered several War Democrats for the ticket in 1864, and sent an agent to sound out General Benjamin Butler as a possible running mate. In May 1864, the president dispatched General Daniel Sickles to Nashville on a fact-finding mission. Although Sickles denied that he was there either to investigate or interview the military governor, Johnson biographer Hans L. Trefousse believes that Sickles's trip was connected to Johnson's subsequent nomination for vice president. According to historian Albert Castel in his account of Johnson's presidency, Lincoln was impressed by Johnson's administration of Tennessee. Gordon-Reed points out that while the Lincoln-Hamlin ticket might have been considered geographically balanced in 1860, "having Johnson, the southern War Democrat, on the ticket sent the right message about the folly of secession and the continuing capacity for union within the country." Another factor was the desire of Secretary of State William Seward to frustrate the vice-presidential candidacy of fellow New Yorker and former senator Daniel S. Dickinson, a War Democrat, as Seward would probably have had to yield his place if another New Yorker became vice president. Johnson, once he was told by reporters the likely purpose of Sickles' visit, was active on his own behalf, delivering speeches and having his political friends work behind the scenes to boost his candidacy.

To sound a theme of unity in 1864, Lincoln ran under the banner of the National Union Party, rather than that of the Republicans. At the party's convention in Baltimore in June, Lincoln was easily nominated, although there had been some talk of replacing him with a cabinet officer or one of the more successful generals. After the convention backed Lincoln, former Secretary of War Simon Cameron offered a resolution to nominate Hamlin, but it was defeated. Johnson was nominated for vice president by C.M. Allen of Indiana with an Iowa delegate seconding it. On the first ballot, Johnson led with 200 votes to 150 for Hamlin and 108 for Dickinson. On the second ballot, Kentucky switched its vote for Johnson, beginning a stampede. Johnson was named on the second ballot with 491 votes to Hamlin's 17 and eight for Dickinson; the nomination was made unanimous. Lincoln expressed pleasure at the result, "Andy Johnson, I think, is a good man." When word reached Nashville, a crowd assembled and the military governor obliged with a speech contending his selection as a Southerner meant that the rebel states had not actually left the Union.

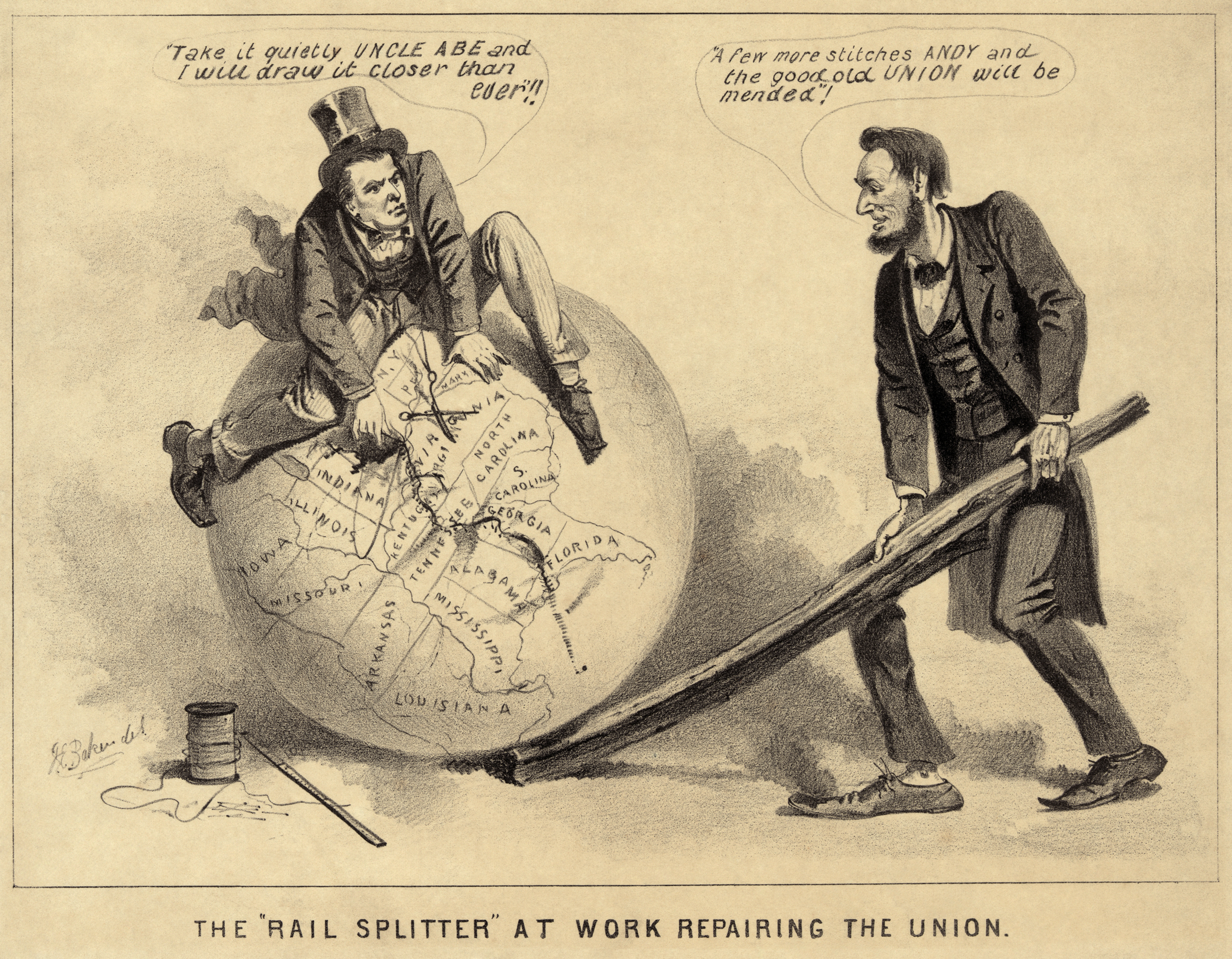
1865 political cartoon portraying Lincoln and Johnson using their talents as rail-splitter and tailor to repair the Union.

Although it was unusual at the time for a national candidate to actively campaign, Johnson gave a number of speeches in Tennessee, Kentucky, Ohio, and Indiana. He also sought to boost his chances in Tennessee while reestablishing civil government by making the loyalty oath even more restrictive, in that voters would now have to swear that they opposed making a settlement with the Confederacy. The Democratic candidate for president, George McClellan, hoped to avoid additional bloodshed by negotiation, and so the stricter loyalty oath effectively disenfranchised his supporters. Lincoln declined to override Johnson, and their ticket took the state by 25,000 votes. Congress refused to count Tennessee's electoral votes, but Lincoln and Johnson did not need them, having won in most states that had voted, and easily secured the election.

Now Vice President-elect, Johnson was eager to complete the work of reestablishing civilian government in Tennessee, although the timetable for the election of a new governor did not allow it to take place until after Inauguration Day, March 4. He hoped to remain in Nashville to complete his task, but was told by Lincoln's advisers that he could not stay, but would be sworn in with Lincoln. In these months, Union troops finished the retaking of eastern Tennessee, including Greeneville. Just before his departure, the voters of Tennessee ratified a new constitution, which abolished slavery, on February 22, 1865. One of Johnson's final acts as military governor was to certify the results.

Johnson traveled to Washington to be sworn into office, although according to Gordon-Reed, "in light of what happened on March 4, 1865, it might have been better if Johnson had stayed in Nashville." Johnson may have been ill; Castel cited typhoid fever, though Gordon-Reed notes that there is no independent evidence for that diagnosis. On the evening of March 3, Johnson attended a party in his honor at which he drank heavily. Hung over the following morning at the Capitol, he asked Vice President Hamlin for some whiskey. Hamlin produced a bottle, and Johnson took two stiff drinks, stating "I need all the strength for the occasion I can have." In the Senate Chamber, Johnson delivered a rambling address as Lincoln, the Congress, and dignitaries looked on. Almost incoherent at times, he finally meandered to a halt, whereupon Hamlin hastily swore him in as vice president. Lincoln, who had watched sadly during the debacle, then went to his own swearing-in outside the Capitol, and delivered his acclaimed Second Inaugural Address.

In the weeks after the inauguration, Johnson only presided over the Senate briefly, and hid from public ridicule at the Maryland home of a friend, Francis Preston Blair. When he did return to Washington, it was with the intent of leaving for Tennessee to reestablish his family in Greeneville. Instead, he remained after word came that General Ulysses S. Grant had captured the Confederate capital of Richmond, Virginia, presaging the end of the war. Lincoln stated, in response to criticism of Johnson's behavior, that "I have known Andy Johnson for many years; he made a bad slip the other day, but you need not be scared; Andy ain't a drunkard."

== Presidency (1865–1869) ==
=== Accession ===
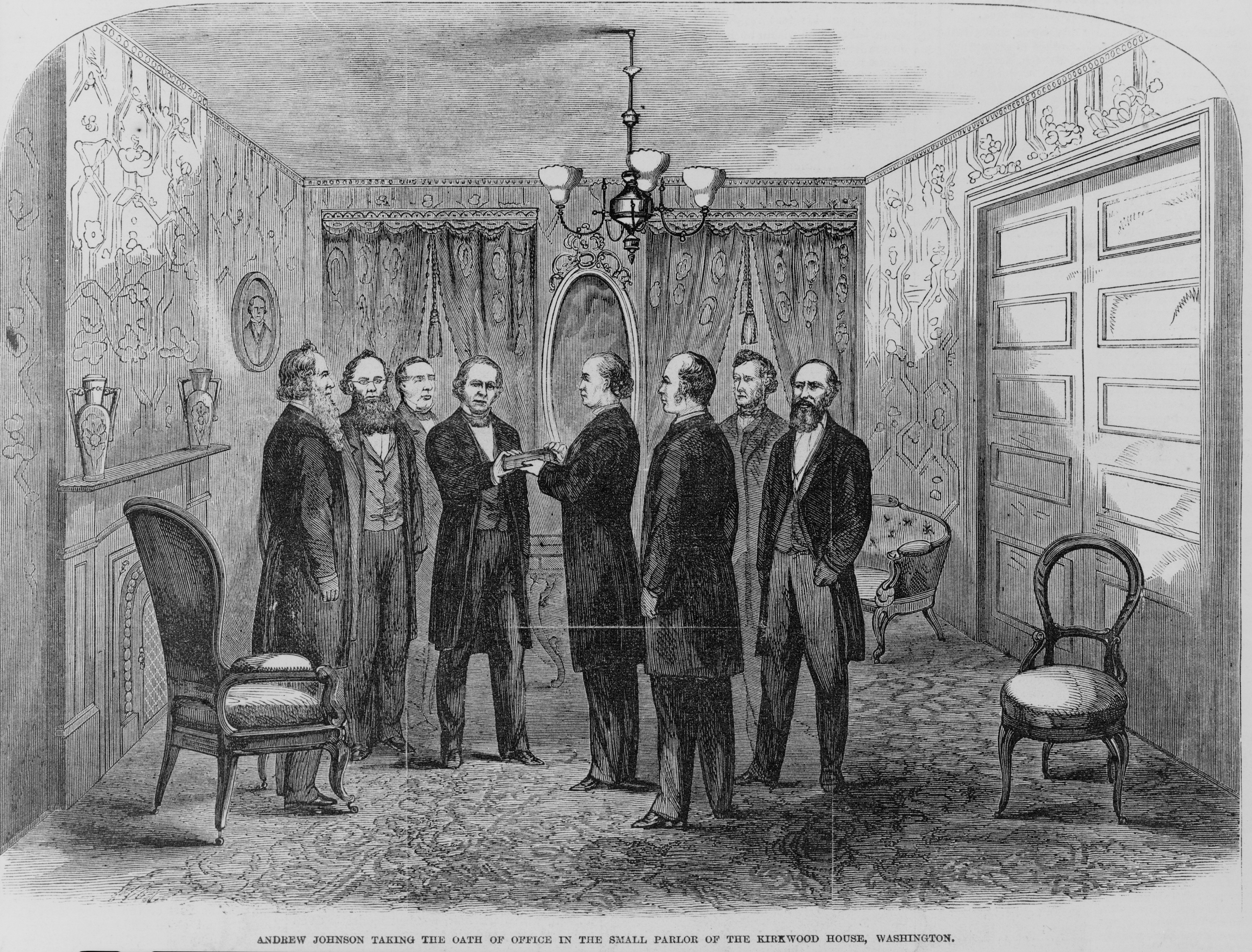
Contemporary woodcut of Johnson taking the presidential oath of office administered by Chief Justice Salmon P. Chase on April 15, 1865

On the afternoon of April 14, 1865, Lincoln and Johnson met for the first time since the inauguration. Trefousse states that Johnson wanted to "induce Lincoln not to be too lenient with traitors"; Gordon-Reed agrees.

That night, President Lincoln was shot and mortally wounded at Ford's Theatre by John Wilkes Booth, a Confederate sympathizer. The shooting of the President was part of a conspiracy to assassinate Lincoln, Johnson, and Seward the same night. Seward barely survived his wounds, while Johnson escaped attack as his would-be assassin, George Atzerodt, got drunk instead of killing the vice president. Leonard J. Farwell, a fellow boarder at the Kirkwood House, awoke Johnson with news of Lincoln's shooting. Johnson rushed to the President's deathbed, where he remained a short time, on his return promising, "They shall suffer for this. They shall suffer for this." Lincoln died at 7:22 the next morning; Johnson's swearing-in occurred between 10 and 11 am with Chief Justice Salmon P. Chase presiding in the presence of most of the Cabinet. Johnson's demeanor was described by the newspapers as "solemn and dignified". Some Cabinet members had last seen Johnson, apparently drunk, at the inauguration. At noon, Johnson conducted his first Cabinet meeting in the Treasury Secretary's office, and asked all members to remain in their positions.

The events of the assassination resulted in speculation, then and subsequently, concerning Johnson and what the conspirators might have intended for him. In the vain hope of having his life spared after his capture, Atzerodt spoke much about the conspiracy, but did not say anything to indicate that the plotted assassination of Johnson was merely a ruse. Conspiracy theorists point to the fact that on the day of the assassination, Booth came to the Kirkwood House and left one of his cards with Johnson's private secretary, William A. Browning. The message on it was: "Don't wish to disturb you. Are you at home? J. Wilkes Booth."

Johnson presided with dignity over Lincoln's funeral ceremonies in Washington, before his predecessor's body was sent home to Springfield, Illinois, for interment. Shortly after Lincoln's death, Union General William T. Sherman reported he had, without consulting Washington, reached an armistice agreement with Confederate General Joseph E. Johnston for the surrender of Confederate forces in North Carolina in exchange for the existing state government remaining in power, with private property rights (slaves) to be respected. This did not even grant freedom to those in slavery. This was not acceptable to Johnson or the Cabinet, who sent word for Sherman to secure the surrender without making political deals, which he did. Further, Johnson placed a $100,000 bounty (equivalent to $2.1 million in 2025) on Confederate President Davis, then a fugitive, which gave Johnson the reputation of a man who would be tough on the South. More controversially, he permitted the execution of Mary Surratt for her part in Lincoln's assassination. Surratt was executed with three others, including Atzerodt, on July 7, 1865.

=== Reconstruction ===
==== Background ====
Upon taking office, Johnson faced the question of what to do with the former Confederacy. President Lincoln had authorized loyalist governments in Virginia, Arkansas, Louisiana, and Tennessee as the Union came to control large parts of those states and advocated a ten percent plan that would allow elections after ten percent of the voters in any state took an oath of future loyalty to the Union. Congress considered this too lenient; its own plan, requiring a majority of voters to take the loyalty oath, passed both houses in 1864, but Lincoln pocket vetoed it.

Johnson had three goals in Reconstruction. He sought a speedy restoration of the states, on the grounds that they had never truly left the Union, and thus should again be recognized once loyal citizens formed a government. To Johnson, African-American suffrage was a delay and a distraction; it had always been a state responsibility to decide who should vote. Second, political power in the Southern states should pass from the planter class to his beloved "plebeians". Johnson feared that the freedmen, many of whom were still economically bound to their former masters, might vote at their direction. Johnson's third priority was election in his own right in 1868, a feat no one who had succeeded a deceased president had managed to accomplish, attempting to secure a Democratic anti-Congressional Reconstruction coalition in the South.

The Republicans had formed a number of factions. The Radical Republicans sought voting and other civil rights for African Americans. They believed that the freedmen could be induced to vote Republican in gratitude for emancipation, and that black votes could keep the Republicans in power and Southern Democrats, including former rebels, out of influence. They believed that top Confederates should be punished. The Moderate Republicans sought to keep the Democrats out of power at a national level, and prevent former rebels from resuming power. They were not as enthusiastic about the idea of African-American suffrage as their Radical colleagues, either because of their own local political concerns, or because they believed that the freedman would be likely to cast his vote badly. Northern Democrats favored the unconditional restoration of the Southern states. They did not support African-American suffrage, which might threaten Democratic control in the South.

==== Presidential Reconstruction ====
Johnson was initially left to devise a Reconstruction policy without legislative intervention, as Congress was not due to meet again until December 1865. Radical Republicans told the President that the Southern states were economically in a state of chaos and urged him to use his leverage to insist on rights for freedmen as a condition of restoration to the Union. But Johnson, with the support of other officials including Seward, insisted that the franchise was a state, not a federal matter. The Cabinet was divided on the issue.

Johnson's first Reconstruction actions were two proclamations, with the unanimous backing of his Cabinet, on May 29. One recognized the Virginia government led by provisional Governor Francis Pierpont. The second provided amnesty for all ex-rebels except those holding property valued at $20,000 or more; it also appointed a temporary governor for North Carolina and authorized elections. Neither of these proclamations included provisions regarding black suffrage or freedmen's rights. The President ordered constitutional conventions in other former rebel states.

As Southern states began the process of forming governments, Johnson's policies received considerable public support in the North, which he took as unconditional backing for quick reinstatement of the South. While he received such support from the white South, he underestimated the determination of Northerners to ensure that the war had not been fought for nothing. It was important, in Northern public opinion, that the South acknowledge its defeat, that slavery be ended, and that the lot of African Americans be improved. Voting rights were less important at the time—only a handful of Northern states (mostly in New England) gave African-American men the right to vote on the same basis as whites, and in late 1865, Connecticut, Wisconsin, and Minnesota voted down African-American suffrage proposals by large margins. Northern public opinion tolerated Johnson's inaction on black suffrage as an experiment, to be allowed if it quickened Southern acceptance of defeat. Instead, white Southerners felt emboldened. A number of Southern states passed Black Codes, binding African-American laborers to farms on annual contracts they could not quit, and allowing law enforcement at whim to arrest them for vagrancy and rent out their labor. Most Southerners elected to Congress were former Confederates, with the most prominent being Georgia Senator-designate and former Confederate vice president Alexander Stephens. Congress assembled in early December 1865; Johnson's conciliatory annual message to them was well received. Nevertheless, Congress refused to seat the Southern legislators and established a committee to recommend appropriate Reconstruction legislation.

Northerners were outraged at the idea of unrepentant Confederate leaders, such as Stephens, rejoining the federal government at a time when emotional wounds from the war remained raw. They saw the Black Codes placing African Americans in a position barely above slavery. Republicans also feared that restoration of the Southern states would return the Democrats to power. In addition, according to David O. Stewart in his book on Johnson's impeachment, "the violence and poverty that oppressed the South would galvanize the opposition to Johnson".

==== Break with the Republicans: 1866 ====
Congress was reluctant to confront the President, and initially only sought to fine-tune Johnson's policies towards the South. According to Trefousse, "If there was a time when Johnson could have come to an agreement with the moderates of the Republican Party, it was the period following the return of Congress." The President was unhappy about the provocative actions of the Southern states, and about the continued control by the antebellum elite there, but made no statement publicly, believing that Southerners had a right to act as they did, even if it was unwise to do so. By late January 1866, he was convinced that winning a showdown with the Radical Republicans was necessary to his political plans – both for the success of Reconstruction and for reelection in 1868. He would have preferred that the conflict arise over the legislative efforts to enfranchise African Americans in the District of Columbia, a proposal that had been defeated overwhelmingly in an all-white referendum. A bill to accomplish this passed the House of Representatives, but to Johnson's disappointment, stalled in the Senate before he could veto it.

Illinois Senator Lyman Trumbull, leader of the Moderate Republicans and Chairman of the Judiciary Committee, was anxious to reach an understanding with the President. He ushered through Congress a bill extending the Freedmen's Bureau beyond its scheduled abolition in 1867, and the first Civil Rights Bill, to grant citizenship to the freedmen. Trumbull met several times with Johnson and was convinced the President would sign the measures (Johnson rarely contradicted visitors, often fooling those who met with him into thinking he was in accord). In fact, the President opposed both bills as infringements on state sovereignty. Additionally, both of Trumbull's bills were unpopular among white Southerners, whom Johnson hoped to include in his new party. Johnson vetoed the Freedman's Bureau bill on February 18, 1866, to the delight of white Southerners and the puzzled anger of Republican legislators. He considered himself vindicated when a move to override his veto failed in the Senate the following day. Johnson believed that the Radicals would now be isolated and defeated and that the moderate Republicans would form behind him; he did not understand that Moderates also wanted to see African Americans treated fairly.

On February 22, 1866, Washington's Birthday, Johnson gave an impromptu speech to supporters who had marched to the White House and called for an address in honor of the first president. In his hour-long speech, he instead referred to himself over 200 times. More damagingly, he also spoke of "men ... still opposed to the Union" to whom he could not extend the hand of friendship he gave to the South. When called upon by the crowd to say who they were, Johnson named Pennsylvania Congressman Thaddeus Stevens, Massachusetts Senator Charles Sumner, and abolitionist Wendell Phillips, and accused them of plotting his assassination. Republicans viewed the address as a declaration of war, while one Democratic ally estimated Johnson's speech cost the party 200,000 votes in the 1866 congressional midterm elections.

Although strongly urged by moderates to sign the Civil Rights Act of 1866, Johnson broke decisively with them by vetoing it on March 27. In his veto message, he objected to the measure because it conferred citizenship on the freedmen at a time when 11 out of 36 states were unrepresented in the Congress, and that it "discriminated" in favor of African Americans and against whites. Within three weeks, Congress had overridden his veto, the first time that had been done on a major bill in American history. The veto, often seen as a key mistake of Johnson's presidency, convinced moderates there was no hope of working with him. Historian Eric Foner, in his volume on Reconstruction, views it as "the most disastrous miscalculation of his political career". According to Stewart, the veto was "for many his defining blunder, setting a tone of perpetual confrontation with Congress that prevailed for the rest of his presidency".

Congress also proposed the Fourteenth Amendment to the states. Written by Trumbull and others, it was sent for ratification by state legislatures in a process in which the president plays no part, though Johnson opposed it. The amendment was designed to put the key provisions of the Civil Rights Act into the Constitution, but also went further. The amendment extended citizenship to every person born in the United States (except Indians on reservations), penalized states that did not give the vote to freedmen, and most importantly, created new federal civil rights that could be protected by federal courts. It also guaranteed that the federal debt would be paid and forbade repayment of Confederate war debts. Further, it disqualified many former Confederates from office, although the disability could be removed — by Congress, not the president. Both houses passed the Freedmen's Bureau Act a second time, and again the President vetoed it; this time, the veto was overridden. By the summer of 1866, when Congress finally adjourned, Johnson's method of restoring states to the Union by executive fiat, without safeguards for the freedmen, was in deep trouble. His home state of Tennessee ratified the Fourteenth Amendment despite the President's opposition. When Tennessee did so, Congress immediately seated its proposed delegation, embarrassing Johnson.

Efforts to compromise failed, and a political war ensued between the united Republicans on one side, and on the other, Johnson and his Northern and Southern allies in the Democratic Party. He called a convention of the National Union Party. Republicans had returned to using their previous identifier; Johnson intended to use the discarded name to unite his supporters and gain election to a full term, in 1868. The battleground was the election of 1866; Southern states were not allowed to vote. Johnson campaigned vigorously, undertaking a public speaking tour, known as the "Swing Around the Circle". The trip, including speeches in Chicago, St. Louis, Indianapolis, and Columbus, proved politically disastrous, with the President making controversial comparisons between himself and Jesus, and engaging in arguments with hecklers. These exchanges were attacked as beneath the dignity of the presidency. The Republicans won by a landslide, increasing their two-thirds majority in Congress, and made plans to control Reconstruction. Johnson blamed the Democrats for giving only lukewarm support to the National Union movement.

==== Radical Reconstruction ====
Even with the Republican victory in November 1866, Johnson considered himself in a strong position. The Fourteenth Amendment had not yet been ratified by enough states to go into force, with Tennessee alone among the Southern or border states in voting for it. As the amendment required ratification by three-quarters of the states to become part of the Constitution, he believed the deadlock would be broken in his favor, leading to his election in 1868. Once it reconvened in December 1866, an energized Congress began passing legislation, often over a presidential veto; this included the District of Columbia voting bill. Congress admitted Nebraska to the Union over a veto, and the Republicans gained two senators and a state that promptly ratified the amendment. Johnson's veto of a bill for statehood for Colorado Territory was sustained; enough senators agreed that a district with a population of 30,000 was not yet worthy of statehood to win the day.

In January 1867, Congressman Stevens introduced legislation to dissolve the Southern state governments and reconstitute them into five military districts, under martial law. The states would begin again by holding constitutional conventions. African Americans could vote for or become delegates; former Confederates could not. In the legislative process, Congress added to the bill that restoration to the Union would follow the state's ratification of the Fourteenth Amendment, and completion of the process of adding it to the Constitution. Johnson and the Southerners attempted a compromise, whereby the South would agree to a modified version of the amendment without the disqualification of former Confederates, and for limited black suffrage. The Republicans insisted on the full language of the amendment, and the deal fell through. Although Johnson could have pocket vetoed the First Reconstruction Act as it was presented to him less than ten days before the end of the Thirty-Ninth Congress, he chose to veto it directly on March 2, 1867; Congress overruled him the same day. Also on March 2, Congress passed the Tenure of Office Act over the President's veto, in response to statements during the Swing Around the Circle that he planned to fire Cabinet secretaries who did not agree with him. This bill, requiring Senate approval for the firing of Cabinet members during the tenure of the president who appointed them and for one month afterwards, was immediately controversial, with some senators doubting that it was constitutional or that its terms applied to Johnson, whose key Cabinet officers were Lincoln holdovers.

=== Impeachment ===
Secretary of War Edwin Stanton was an able and hard-working man, but difficult to deal with. Johnson both admired and was exasperated by his War Secretary, who, in combination with General of the Army Grant, worked to undermine the president's Southern policy from within his own administration. Johnson considered firing Stanton, but respected him for his wartime service as secretary. Stanton, for his part, feared allowing Johnson to appoint his successor and refused to resign, despite his public disagreements with his president.

The new Congress met for a few weeks in March 1867, then adjourned, leaving the House Committee on the Judiciary behind, tasked in the first impeachment inquiry against Johnson with reporting back to the full House whether there were grounds for Johnson to be impeached. This committee duly met, examined the President's bank accounts, and summoned members of the Cabinet to testify. When a federal court released former Confederate president Davis on bail on May 13 (he had been captured shortly after the war), the committee investigated whether the President had impeded the prosecution. It learned that Johnson was eager to have Davis tried. A bipartisan majority of the committee voted down impeachment charges; the committee adjourned on June 3.

Later in June, Johnson and Stanton battled over the question of whether the military officers placed in command of the South could override the civil authorities. The President had Attorney General Henry Stanbery issue an opinion backing his position that they could not. Johnson sought to pin down Stanton either as for, and thus endorsing Johnson's position, or against, showing himself to be opposed to his president and the rest of the Cabinet. Stanton evaded the point in meetings and written communications. When Congress reconvened in July, it passed a Reconstruction Act against Johnson's position, waited for his veto, overrode it, and went home. In addition to clarifying the powers of the generals, the legislation also deprived the President of control over the Army in the South. With Congress in recess until November, Johnson decided to fire Stanton and relieve one of the military commanders, General Philip Sheridan, who had dismissed the governor of Texas and installed a replacement with little popular support. Johnson was initially deterred by a strong objection from Grant, but on August 5, the President demanded Stanton's resignation; the secretary refused to quit with Congress out of session. Johnson then suspended him pending the next meeting of Congress as permitted under the Tenure of Office Act; Grant agreed to serve as temporary replacement while continuing to lead the Army.

Grant, under protest, followed Johnson's order transferring Sheridan and another of the district commanders, Daniel Sickles, who had angered Johnson by firmly following Congress's plan. The President also issued a proclamation pardoning most Confederates, exempting those who held office under the Confederacy, or who had served in federal office before the war but had breached their oaths. Although Republicans expressed anger with his actions, the 1867 elections generally went Democratic. No seats in Congress were directly elected in the polling, but the Democrats took control of the Ohio General Assembly, allowing them to defeat for reelection one of Johnson's strongest opponents, Senator Benjamin Wade. Voters in Ohio, Connecticut, and Minnesota turned down propositions to grant African Americans the vote.

The adverse results momentarily put a stop to Republican calls to impeach Johnson, who was elated by the elections. Nevertheless, once Congress met in November, the Judiciary Committee reversed itself and passed a resolution of impeachment against Johnson. After much debate about whether anything the President had done was a high crime or misdemeanor, the standard under the Constitution, the resolution was defeated by the House of Representatives on December 7, 1867, by a vote of 57 in favor to 108 opposed.

Johnson notified Congress of Stanton's suspension and Grant's interim appointment. In January 1868, the Senate disapproved of his action, and reinstated Stanton, contending the President had violated the Tenure of Office Act. Grant stepped aside over Johnson's objection, causing a complete break between them. Johnson then dismissed Stanton and appointed Lorenzo Thomas to replace him. Stanton refused to leave his office, and on February 24, 1868, the House impeached the President for intentionally violating the Tenure of Office Act, by a vote of 128 to 47. The House subsequently adopted eleven articles of impeachment, for the most part alleging that he had violated the Tenure of Office Act, and had questioned the legitimacy of Congress.

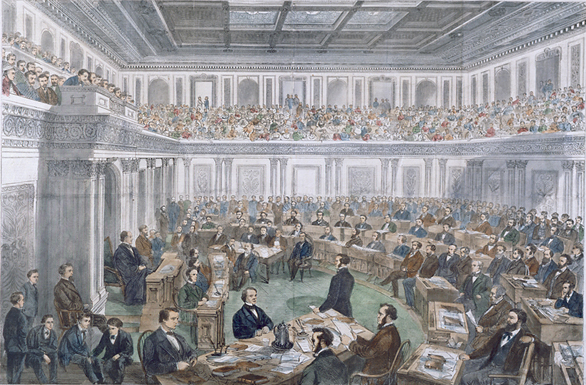
Illustration of Johnson's impeachment trial in the United States Senate, by Theodore R. Davis, published in Harper's Weekly

On March 5, 1868, the impeachment trial began in the Senate and lasted almost three months. Congressmen George S. Boutwell, Benjamin Butler and Thaddeus Stevens acted as managers for the House, or prosecutors, and William M. Evarts, Benjamin R. Curtis and former Attorney General Stanbery were Johnson's counsel. Chief Justice Chase served as presiding judge.

The defense relied on the provision of the Tenure of Office Act that made it applicable only to appointees of the current administration. Since Lincoln had appointed Stanton, the defense maintained Johnson had not violated the act, and also argued that the President had the right to test the constitutionality of an act of Congress. Johnson's counsel insisted that he make no appearance at the trial, nor publicly comment about the proceedings, and except for a pair of interviews in April, he complied.

Johnson maneuvered to gain an acquittal; for example, he pledged to Iowa Senator James W. Grimes that he would not interfere with Congress's Reconstruction efforts. Grimes reported to a group of Moderates, many of whom voted for acquittal, that he believed the President would keep his word. Johnson also promised to install the respected John Schofield as War Secretary. Kansas Senator Edmund G. Ross received assurances that the new, Radical-influenced constitutions ratified in South Carolina and Arkansas would be transmitted to the Congress without delay, an action which would give him and other senators political cover to vote for acquittal.

One reason senators were reluctant to remove the President was that his successor would have been Ohio Senator Wade, the president pro tempore of the Senate. Wade, a lame duck who left office in early 1869, was a Radical who supported such measures as women's suffrage, placing him beyond the pale politically in much of the nation. Additionally, a President Wade was seen as an obstacle to Grant's ambitions.

With the dealmaking, Johnson was confident of the result in advance of the verdict, and in the days leading up to the ballot, newspapers reported that Stevens and his Radicals had given up. On May 16, the Senate voted on the 11th article of impeachment, accusing Johnson of firing Stanton in violation of the Tenure of Office of Act once the Senate had overturned his suspension. Thirty-five senators voted "guilty" and 19 "not guilty", thus falling short by a single vote of the two-thirds majority required for conviction under the Constitution. Ten Republicans—Senators Grimes, Ross, Trumbull, James Dixon, James Rood Doolittle, Daniel Sheldon Norton, William Pitt Fessenden, Joseph S. Fowler, John B. Henderson, and Peter G. Van Winkle—voted to acquit the President. With Stevens bitterly disappointed at the result, the Senate then adjourned for the Republican National Convention; Grant was nominated for president. The Senate returned on May 26 and voted on the second and third articles, with identical 35–19 results. Faced with those results, Johnson's opponents gave up and dismissed proceedings. Stanton "relinquished" his office on May 26, and the Senate subsequently confirmed Schofield. When Johnson renominated Stanbery to return to his position as attorney general after his service as a defense manager, the Senate refused to confirm him.

Allegations were made at the time and again later that bribery dictated the outcome of the trial. Even when it was in progress, Representative Butler began an investigation, held contentious hearings, and issued a report, unendorsed by any other congressman. Butler focused on a New York–based "Astor House Group", supposedly led by political boss and editor Thurlow Weed. This organization was said to have raised large sums of money from whiskey interests through Cincinnati lawyer Charles Woolley to bribe senators to acquit Johnson. Butler went so far as to imprison Woolley in the Capitol building when he refused to answer questions, but failed to prove bribery.

=== Foreign policy ===
Soon after taking office as president, Johnson reached an accord with Secretary of State William H. Seward that there would be no change in foreign policy. In practice, this meant that Seward would continue to run things as he had under Lincoln. Seward and Lincoln had been rivals for the nomination in 1860; the victor hoped that Seward would succeed him as president in 1869. At the time of Johnson's accession, the French had intervened in Mexico, sending troops there. While many politicians had indulged in saber rattling over the Mexican matter, Seward preferred quiet diplomacy, warning the French through diplomatic channels that their presence in Mexico was unacceptable. Although the President preferred a more aggressive approach, Seward persuaded him to follow his lead. In April 1866, the French government informed Seward that its troops would be brought home in stages, to conclude by November 1867. On August 14, 1866, Johnson and his cabinet gave a reception for Queen Emma of Hawaii who was returning to Hawaii after her trip to Britain and Europe.

Seward was an expansionist, and sought opportunities to gain territory for the United States. After the loss of the Crimean War in the 1850s, the Russian government saw its North American colony (today Alaska) as a financial liability, and feared losing control to Britain whose troops would easily swoop in and annex the territory from neighboring Canada in any future conflict. Negotiations between Russia and the U.S. over the sale of Alaska were halted due to the outbreak of the Civil War, but after the U.S. victory in the war, talks resumed. Russia instructed its minister in Washington, Baron Eduard de Stoeckl, to negotiate a sale. De Stoeckl did so deftly, getting Seward to raise his offer from $5 million (coincidentally, the minimum that Russia had instructed de Stoeckl to accept) to $7 million, and then getting $200,000 added by raising various objections. This sum of $7.2 million is equivalent to $166 million in present-day terms. On March 30, 1867, de Stoeckl and Seward signed the treaty, working quickly as the Senate was about to adjourn. Johnson and Seward took the signed document to the President's Room in the Capitol, only to be told there was no time to deal with the matter before adjournment. The President summoned the Senate into session to meet on April 1; that body approved the treaty, 37–2. Emboldened by his success in Alaska, Seward sought acquisitions elsewhere. His only success was staking an American claim to uninhabited Wake Island in the Pacific, which would be officially claimed by the U.S. in 1898. He came close with the Danish West Indies as Denmark agreed to sell and the local population approved the transfer in a plebiscite, but the Senate never voted on the treaty and it expired.

Another treaty that fared badly was the Johnson-Clarendon convention, negotiated in settlement of the Alabama Claims, for damages to American shipping from British-built Confederate raiders. Negotiated by the United States Minister to Britain, former Maryland senator Reverdy Johnson, in late 1868, it was ignored by the Senate during the remainder of the President's term. The treaty was rejected after he left office, and the Grant administration later negotiated considerably better terms from Britain.

=== Administration and Cabinet ===
Andrew Johnson cabinet
Office	Name	Term
President	Andrew Johnson	1865–1869
Vice President	none	1865–1869
Secretary of State	William H. Seward	1865–1869
Secretary of the Treasury	Hugh McCulloch	1865–1869
Secretary of War	Edwin Stanton	1865–1868 (Note: Replaced ad interim by Ulysses S. Grant in August 1867 before being reinstated by Congress in January 1868)
John Schofield	1868–1869
Attorney General	James Speed	1865–1866
Henry Stanbery	1866–1868
William M. Evarts	1868–1869
Postmaster General	William Dennison Jr.	1865–1866
Alexander Randall	1866–1869
Secretary of the Navy	Gideon Welles	1865–1869
Secretary of the Interior	John Palmer Usher	1865
James Harlan	1865–1866
Orville Hickman Browning	1866–1869

==== Judicial appointments ====
Johnson appointed nine Article III federal judges during his presidency, all to United States district courts; he did not appoint a justice to serve on the Supreme Court. In April 1866, he nominated Henry Stanbery to fill the vacancy left with the death of John Catron, but Congress eliminated the seat to prevent the appointment, and to ensure that he did not get to make any appointments eliminated the next vacancy as well, providing that the court would shrink by one justice when one next departed from office. Johnson appointed his Greeneville crony, Samuel Milligan, to the United States Court of Claims, where he served from 1868 until his death in 1874.

=== Reforms initiated ===
In June 1866, Johnson signed the Southern Homestead Act into law, believing that the legislation would assist poor whites. Around 28,000 land claims were successfully patented, although few former slaves benefitted from the law, fraud was rampant, and much of the best land was off-limits, reserved for grants to veterans or railroads. In June 1868, Johnson signed an eight-hour law passed by Congress that established an eight-hour workday for laborers and mechanics employed by the Federal Government. Although Johnson told members of a Workingmen's party delegation in Baltimore that he could not directly commit himself to an eight-hour day, he nevertheless told the same delegation that he greatly favoured the "shortest number of hours consistent with the interests of all". According to Richard F. Selcer, however, the good intentions behind the law were "immediately frustrated" as wages were cut by 20%.

=== Completion of term ===
Johnson sought nomination by the 1868 Democratic National Convention in New York in July 1868. He remained very popular among Southern whites, and boosted that popularity by issuing, just before the convention, a pardon ending the possibility of criminal proceedings against any Confederate not already indicted, meaning that only Davis and a few others still might face trial. On the first ballot, Johnson was second to former Ohio representative George H. Pendleton, who had been his Democratic opponent for vice president in 1864. Johnson's support was mostly from the South, and fell away as the ballots passed. On the 22nd ballot, former New York governor Horatio Seymour was nominated, and the President received only four votes, all from Tennessee.

The conflict with Congress continued. Johnson sent Congress proposals for amendments to limit the president to a single six-year term and make the president and the Senate directly elected, and for term limits for judges. Congress took no action on them. When the President was slow to officially report ratifications of the Fourteenth Amendment by the new Southern legislatures, Congress passed a bill, again over his veto, requiring him to do so within ten days of receipt. He still delayed as much as he could, but was required, in July 1868, to report the ratifications making the amendment part of the Constitution.

Seymour's operatives sought Johnson's support, but he long remained silent on the presidential campaign. It was not until October, with the vote already having taken place in some states, that he mentioned Seymour at all, and he never endorsed him. Nevertheless, Johnson regretted Grant's victory, in part because of their animus from the Stanton affair. In his annual message to Congress in December, Johnson urged the repeal of the Tenure of Office Act and told legislators that had they admitted their Southern colleagues in 1865, all would have been well. He celebrated his 60th birthday in late December with a party for several hundred children, though not including those of President-elect Grant, who did not allow his to go.

On Christmas Day 1868, Johnson issued a final amnesty, this one covering everyone, including Davis. He also issued, in his final months in office, pardons for crimes, including one for Dr. Samuel Mudd, controversially convicted of involvement in the Lincoln assassination (he had set Booth's broken leg) and imprisoned in Fort Jefferson on Florida's Dry Tortugas.

On March 3, the President hosted a large public reception at the White House on his final full day in office. Grant had made it known that he was unwilling to ride in the same carriage as Johnson, as was customary, and Johnson refused to go to the inauguration at all. Despite an effort by Seward to prompt a change of mind, he spent the morning of March 4 finishing last-minute business, and then shortly after noon rode from the White House to the home of a friend.

== Post-presidency (1869–1875) ==
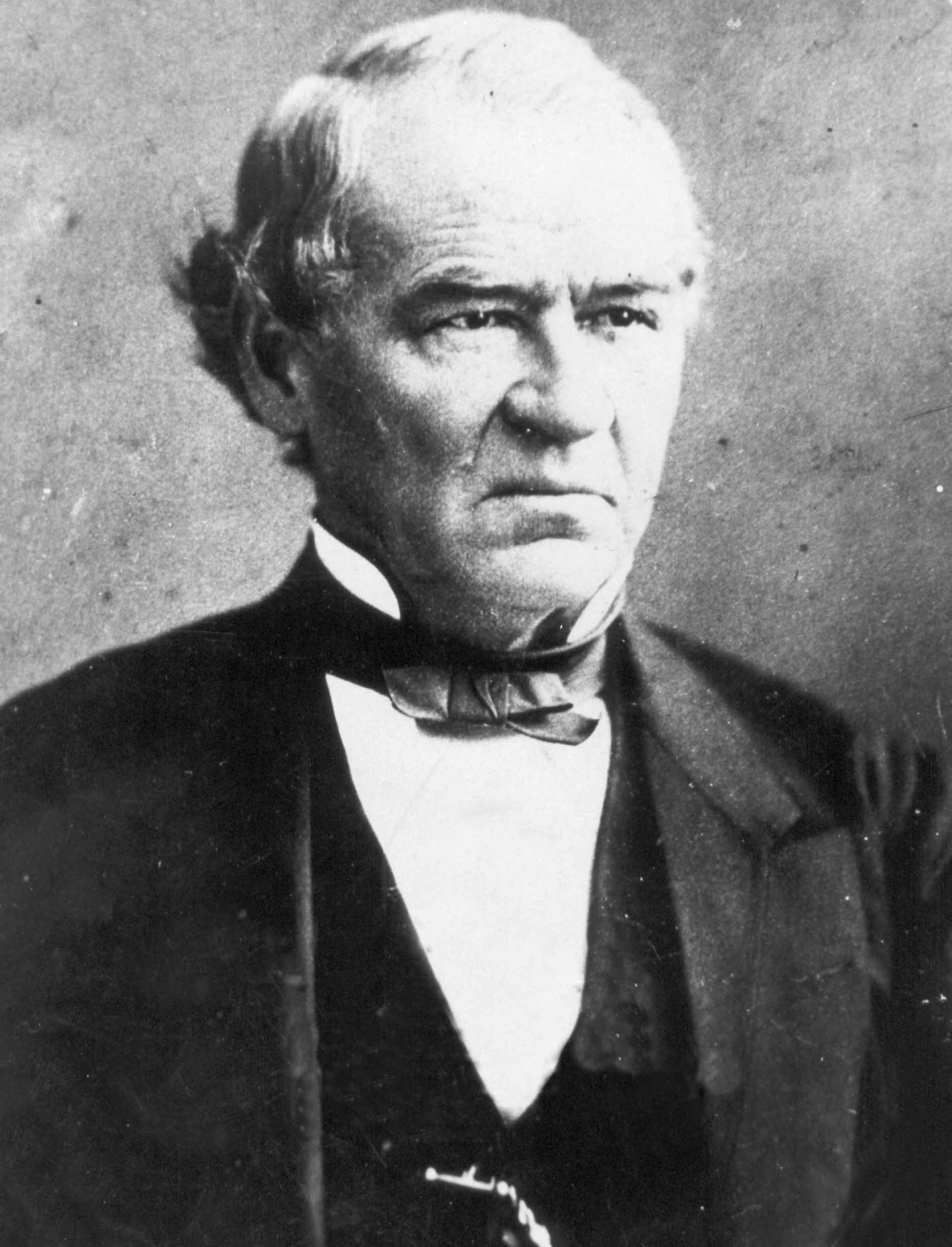
Johnson in 1875; at age 66

After leaving the presidency, Johnson remained for some weeks in Washington, then returned to Greeneville for the first time in eight years. He was honored with large public celebrations along the way, especially in Tennessee, where cities hostile to him during the war hung out welcome banners. He had arranged to purchase a large farm near Greeneville to live on after his presidency.

Some expected Johnson to run for Governor of Tennessee or for the Senate again, while others thought that he would become a railroad executive. Johnson found Greeneville boring, and his private life was embittered by the suicide of his son Robert in 1869. Seeking vindication for himself, and revenge against his political enemies, he launched a Senate bid soon after returning home. Tennessee had gone Republican, but court rulings restoring the vote to some whites and suppression of the African-American vote by the Ku Klux Klan led to a Democratic victory in the legislative elections in August 1869. Johnson was seen as a likely victor in the Senate election, although hated by Radical Republicans, and by some Democrats because of his wartime activities. Although he was at one point within a single vote of victory in the legislature's balloting, the Republicans eventually elected Henry Cooper over Johnson, 54–51. In 1872, there was a special election for an at-large congressional seat for Tennessee; Johnson initially sought the Democratic nomination, but when he saw that it would go to former Confederate general Benjamin F. Cheatham, decided to run as an independent. The former president was defeated, finishing third, but the split in the Democratic Party defeated Cheatham in favor of an old Johnson Unionist ally, Horace Maynard.

In 1873, Johnson contracted cholera during an epidemic but recovered; that year he lost about $73,000 (~$1.78 million in 2025) when the First National Bank of Washington went under, though he was eventually repaid much of the sum.

=== Return to the Senate ===
He began looking towards the next Senate election to take place in the legislature in early 1875. Johnson began to woo the farmers' Grange movement; with his Jeffersonian leanings, he easily gained their support. He spoke throughout the state in his final campaign tour. Few African Americans outside the large towns were now able to vote as Reconstruction faded in Tennessee, setting a pattern that would be repeated in the other Southern states; the white domination would last almost a century. In the Tennessee legislative elections in August, the Democrats elected 92 legislators to the Republicans' eight, and Johnson went to Nashville for the legislative session. When the balloting for the Senate seat began on January 20, 1875, he led with 30 votes, but did not have the required majority as three former Confederate generals, one former colonel, and a former Democratic congressman split the vote with him. Johnson's opponents tried to agree on a single candidate who might gain majority support and defeat him, but failed, and he was elected on January 26 on the 54th ballot, with a margin of a single vote. Nashville erupted in rejoicing; remarked Johnson, "Thank God for the vindication."

Johnson's comeback garnered national attention, with the St. Louis Republican calling it "the most magnificent personal triumph which the history of American politics can show". At his swearing-in in the Senate on March 5, 1875, he was greeted with flowers, and sworn in alongside Hamlin (his predecessor as vice president) by incumbent Vice President Henry Wilson (who as senator had voted for Johnson's ouster). Many Republicans ignored Senator Johnson, though some, such as Ohio's John Sherman (who had voted for conviction), shook his hand. Johnson remains the only former president to serve in the Senate. He spoke only once in the short session, on March 22 lambasting President Grant for his use of federal troops in support of Louisiana's Reconstruction government. The former president asked, "How far off is military despotism?" and concluded his speech, "may God bless this people and God save the Constitution".

=== Death ===
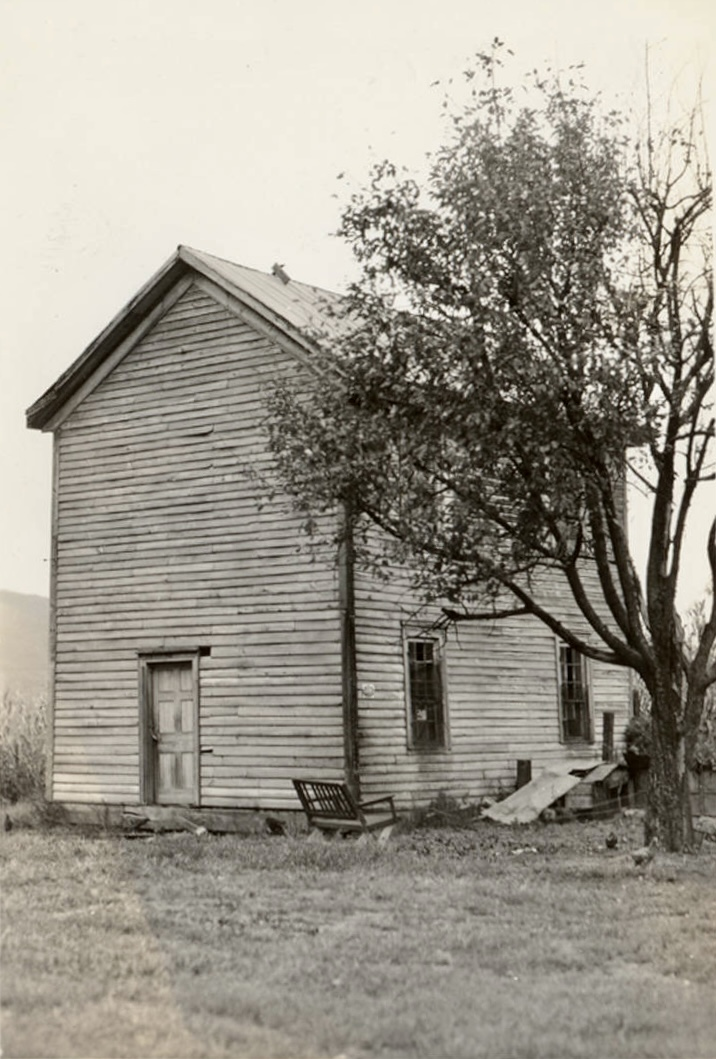
The Stover farmhouse, where Johnson died, as photographed in 1935

Johnson returned home after the special session concluded. In late July 1875, convinced some of his opponents were defaming him in the Ohio gubernatorial race, he decided to travel there to give speeches. He began the trip on July 28, and broke the journey at his daughter Mary's farm near Elizabethton, where his daughter Martha was also staying. That evening he had a stroke, but refused medical treatment until the next day, when he did not improve and two doctors were sent for from Elizabethton. He seemed to respond to their ministrations, but had another stroke on the evening of July 30, and died early the following morning at the age of 66. President Grant had the "painful duty" of announcing the death of the only surviving past president. Northern newspapers, in their obituaries, tended to focus on Johnson's loyalty during the war, while Southern ones paid tribute to his actions as president. Johnson's funeral was held on August 3 in Greeneville. He was buried with his body wrapped in an American flag and a copy of the U.S. Constitution placed under his head, according to his wishes. The burial ground was dedicated as the Andrew Johnson National Cemetery in 1906, and with his home and tailor's shop, is part of the Andrew Johnson National Historic Site.

== Historical reputation and legacy ==
According to Castel, "historians [of Johnson's presidency] have tended to concentrate to the exclusion of practically everything else upon his role in that titanic event [Reconstruction]." Through the remainder of the 19th century, there were few historical evaluations of Johnson and his presidency. Memoirs from Northerners who had dealt with him, such as former vice president Henry Wilson and Maine Senator James G. Blaine, depicted him as an obstinate boor who tried to favor the South in Reconstruction but was frustrated by Congress. According to historian Howard K. Beale in his journal article about the historiography of Reconstruction, "Men of the postwar decades were more concerned with justifying their own position than they were with painstaking search for truth. Thus [Alabama representative and historian] Hilary Herbert and his corroborators presented a Southern indictment of Northern policies, and Henry Wilson's history was a brief for the North."

The turn of the 20th century saw the first significant historical evaluations of Johnson. Leading the wave was Pulitzer Prize-winning historian James Ford Rhodes, who wrote of the former president:

Johnson acted in accordance with his nature. He had intellectual force but it worked in a groove. Obstinate rather than firm it undoubtedly seemed to him that following counsel and making concessions were a display of weakness. At all events from his December message to the veto of the Civil Rights Bill he yielded not a jot to Congress. The moderate senators and representatives (who constituted a majority of the Union party) asked him for only a slight compromise; their action was really an entreaty that he would unite with them to preserve Congress and the country from the policy of the radicals ... His quarrel with Congress prevented the readmission into the Union on generous terms of the members of the late Confederacy ... His pride of opinion, his desire to beat, blinded him to the real welfare of the South and of the whole country.

Rhodes ascribed Johnson's faults to his personal weaknesses, and blamed him for the problems of the postbellum South. Other early 20th-century historians, such as John Burgess, future president Woodrow Wilson, and William Dunning, concurred with Rhodes, believing Johnson flawed and politically inept but concluding that he had tried to carry out Lincoln's plans for the South in good faith. Author and journalist Jay Tolson suggests that Wilson "depict[ed Reconstruction] as a vindictive program that hurt even repentant southerners while benefiting northern opportunists, the so-called Carpetbaggers, and cynical white southerners, or Scalawags, who exploited alliances with blacks for political gain."

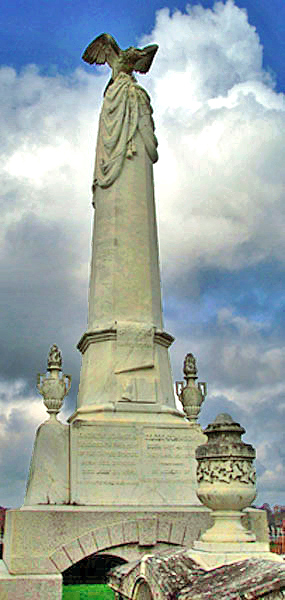
The grave of Johnson in Greeneville, Tennessee

Even as Rhodes and his school wrote, another group of historians (Dunning School) was setting out on the full rehabilitation of Johnson, using for the first time primary sources such as his papers, provided by his daughter Martha before her death in 1901, and the diaries of Johnson's Navy Secretary, Gideon Welles, first published in 1911. The resulting volumes, such as David Miller DeWitt's The Impeachment and Trial of President Andrew Johnson (1903), presented him far more favorably than they did those who had sought to oust him. In James Schouler's 1913 History of the Reconstruction Period, the author accused Rhodes of being "quite unfair to Johnson", though agreeing that the former president had created many of his own problems through inept political moves. These works had an effect; although historians continued to view Johnson as having deep flaws which sabotaged his presidency, they saw his Reconstruction policies as fundamentally correct.

Castel writes:

at the end of the 1920s, an historiographical revolution took place. In the span of three years five widely read books appeared, all highly pro-Johnson. ...They differed in general approach and specific interpretations, but they all glorified Johnson and condemned his enemies. According to these writers, Johnson was a humane, enlightened, and liberal statesman who waged a courageous battle for the Constitution and democracy against scheming and unscrupulous Radicals, who were motivated by a vindictive hatred of the South, partisanship, and a desire to establish the supremacy of Northern "big business". In short, rather than a boor, Johnson was a martyr; instead of a villain, a hero.

Beale wondered in 1940, "is it not time that we studied the history of Reconstruction without first assuming, at least subconsciously, that carpetbaggers and Southern white Republicans were wicked, that Negroes were illiterate incompetents, and that the whole white South owes a debt of gratitude to the restorers of 'white supremacy'?" Despite these doubts, the favorable view of Johnson survived for a time. In 1942, Van Heflin portrayed the former president as a fighter for democracy in the Hollywood film Tennessee Johnson. In 1948, a poll of his colleagues by historian Arthur M. Schlesinger deemed Johnson among the average presidents; in 1956, one by Clinton L. Rossiter named him as one of the near-great chief executives. Foner notes that at the time of these surveys, "the Reconstruction era that followed the Civil War was regarded as a time of corruption and misgovernment caused by granting black men the right to vote."

Earlier historians, including Beale, believed that money drove events, and had seen Reconstruction as an economic struggle. They also accepted, for the most part, that reconciliation between North and South should have been the top priority of Reconstruction. In the 1950s, historians began to focus on the African-American experience as central to Reconstruction. They rejected completely any claim of black inferiority, which had marked many earlier historical works, and saw the developing civil rights movement as a second Reconstruction; some neoabolitionist writers stated they hoped their work on the postbellum era would advance the cause of civil rights. These authors sympathized with the Radical Republicans for their desire to help the African American, and saw Johnson as callous towards the freedman. In a number of works from 1956 onwards by such historians as Fawn Brodie, the former president was depicted as a successful saboteur of efforts to better the freedman's lot. These volumes included major biographies of Stevens and Stanton. Reconstruction was increasingly seen as a noble effort to integrate the freed slaves into society.

In the early 21st century, Johnson is among those commonly mentioned as the worst presidents in U.S. history. According to historian Glenn W. Lafantasie, who believes James Buchanan the worst president, "Johnson is a particular favorite for the bottom of the pile because of his impeachment ... his complete mishandling of Reconstruction policy ... his bristling personality, and his enormous sense of self-importance." Tolson suggests that "Johnson is now scorned for having resisted Radical Republican policies aimed at securing the rights and well-being of the newly emancipated African-Americans." Gordon-Reed notes that Johnson, along with his contemporaries Pierce and Buchanan, is generally listed among the five worst presidents, but states "there have never been more difficult times in the life of this nation. The problems these men had to confront were enormous. It would have taken a succession of Lincolns to do them justice."

Trefousse considers Johnson's legacy to be "the maintenance of white supremacy. His boost to Southern conservatives by undermining Reconstruction was his legacy to the nation, one that would trouble the country for generations to come." Gordon-Reed states of Johnson:

We know the results of Johnson's failures—that his preternatural stubbornness, his mean and crude racism, his primitive and instrumental understanding of the Constitution stunted his capacity for enlightened and forward-thinking leadership when those qualities were so desperately needed. At the same time, Johnson's story has a miraculous quality to it: the poor boy who systematically rose to the heights, fell from grace, and then fought his way back to a position of honor in the country. For good or ill, "only in America", as they say, could Johnson's story unfold in the way that it did.

== See also ==
- Amphitheatrum Johnsonianum, 1867 illustration
- Andrew Johnson alcoholism debate
- Emily Harold, extramarital affair
- List of presidents of the United States by previous experience
- List of presidents of the United States who owned slaves
- Tennessee Johnson, 1942 film

== Notes ==
U.S. House of Representatives
Preceded by Thomas Dickens Arnold	Member of the U.S. House of Representatives from Tennessee's 1st congressional district 1843–1853	Succeeded by Brookins Campbell
Party political offices
Preceded by William Trousdale	Democratic nominee for Governor of Tennessee; 1853, 1855	Succeeded by Isham G. Harris
Preceded by Hannibal Hamlin	Republican nominee for Vice President of the United States¹; 1864	Succeeded by Schuyler Colfax
Political offices
Preceded by William B. Campbell	Governor of Tennessee; 1853–1857	Succeeded by Isham G. Harris
Preceded by Isham G. Harris	Military Governor of Tennessee; 1862–1865	Succeeded by Edward H. East; Acting
Preceded by Hannibal Hamlin	Vice President of the United States; 1865	Succeeded by Schuyler Colfax
Preceded by Abraham Lincoln	President of the United States; 1865–1869	Succeeded by Ulysses S. Grant
U.S. Senate
Preceded by James C. Jones	United States Senator (Class 1) from Tennessee; 1857–1862; Served alongside: John Bell, Alfred O. P. Nicholson	Succeeded by David T. Patterson
Preceded by William Gannaway Brownlow	United States Senator (Class 1) from Tennessee; 1875; Served alongside: Henry Cooper	Succeeded by David M. Key
Notes and references
1. Lincoln and Johnson ran on the National Union ticket in 1864.
