= Tenure of Office Act =

Tenure of Office Act may refer to:

- Tenure of Office Act (1820)
- Tenure of Office Act (1867)
