= Tenure of Office =

Tenure of Office may refer to:

- Academic tenure
- Burrowing (politics), tenure by political contrivance
- Tenure of Office Act (disambiguation)

== See also ==
- Term of office
