= Inauguration of Andrew Johnson =

3rd United States intra-term presidential inauguration

Presidential inauguration of Andrew Johnson
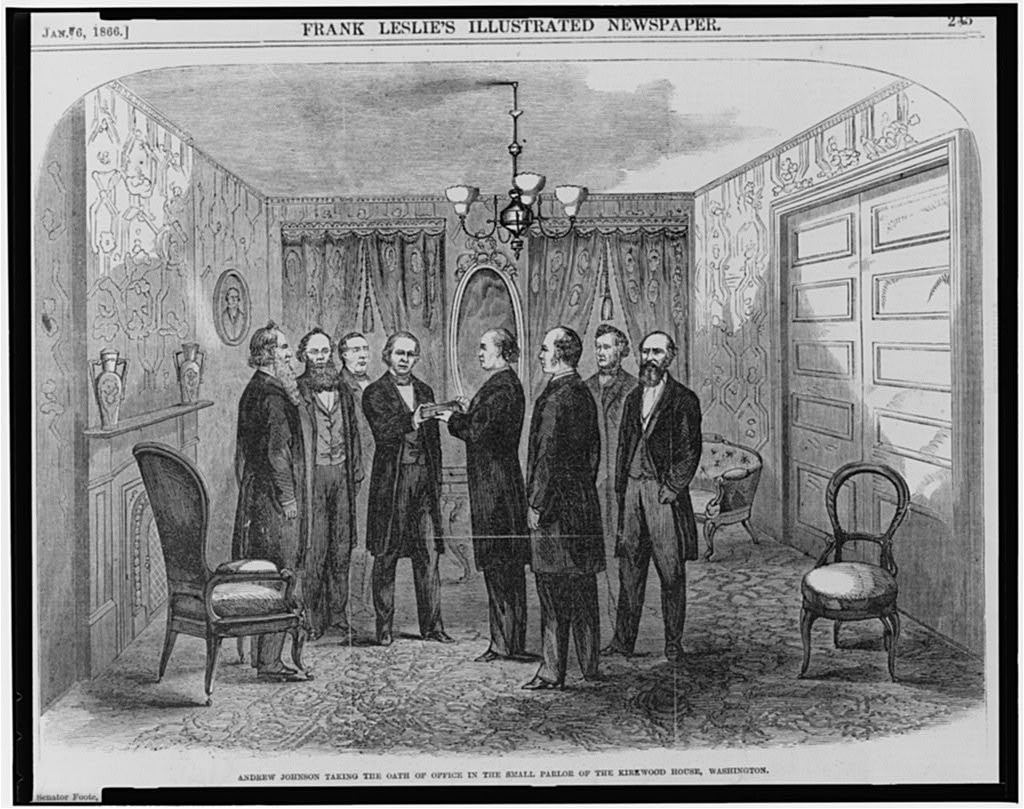
- Swearing-in ceremony in the Kirkwood House (published in Frank Leslie's Illustrated Newspaper, January 6, 1866, almost eight months after the fact)
- Date: April 15, 1865; 161 years ago
- Location: Kirkwood House, Washington, D.C.
- Participants: Andrew Johnson; 17th president of the United States — Assuming office Salmon P. Chase; Chief Justice of the United States — Administering oath

The inauguration of Andrew Johnson as the 17th president of the United States was held on April 15, 1865, on the third floor of Kirkwood House in Washington, D.C., following the assassination of President Abraham Lincoln. The inauguration marked the commencement of Andrew Johnson's only term (a partial term of 3 years, 323 days) as president. Chief Justice Salmon P. Chase administered the presidential oath of office.

This was the third non-scheduled, extraordinary inauguration to take place, and the first extraordinary inauguration in which a Chief Justice administered the oath to the new president. News reports had it that the oath was administered at 11 a.m. that day.

After the ceremony, President Johnson gave an impromptu inaugural address, which began with him begging the cabinet to remain with him and then attacking the Confederate States of America with such venom, that one witness remarked "It would have been better had he been struck dumb."

As President Lincoln lay dying, Vice President Johnson visited the room where he lay. When Mrs. Lincoln saw him, she reportedly screamed and demanded he be removed, so he went back to his room at Kirkwood House.

Rumours spread that Johnson had gotten severely inebriated, and when aides to the now-dead Lincoln came to fetch the new president they were unable to wake him for several minutes. According to these rumours, when he was finally awake he had puffy eyes and his hair was caked with mud from the street, and a barber and doctor were summoned to clean him up for the 10 a.m. ceremony, which most accounts agree went smoothly. However, there are other accounts, believed more reliable by some, that refute this claim.

== List of witnesses ==
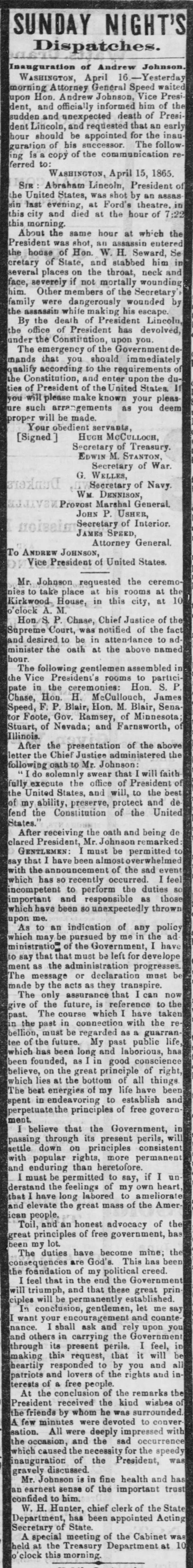
"Sunday Night's Dispatches" The Evansville Daily Journal, April 17, 1865 – Most of what is known about the swearing-in of Johnson comes from one wire report

Most of what is known about the swearing-in of Johnson comes from one wire report: "Andrew Johnson was sworn into office as President of the United States by Chief Justice Chase to-day at eleven o'clock." The ceremony was witnessed by members of the cabinet and "a few Congressmen."

- Attorney General James Speed (1812–1887)
- Treasury Secretary Hugh McCulloch (1808–1895)
- Postmaster Montgomery Blair (1813–1883)
- Blair's father Francis Blair Sr. of Maryland (1791–1876)
- U.S. Senator Solomon Foot of Vermont (1802–1866)
- U.S. Senator Alexander Ramsey of Minnesota (1815–1903)
- U.S. Senator Richard Yates of Illinois (1815–1873)
- U.S. Senator William M. Stewart of Nevada (1827–1909)
- John P. Hale of New Hampshire (1806–1873)
- U.S. Representative John F. Farnsworth of Illinois (1820–1897)

Ramsey, Stewart, and Yates were members of the United States Senate at the time of Andrew Johnson's 1868 impeachment; all three voted to convict.

According to James G. Blaine, the swearing of the oath was attended by "all the members of the Cabinet except" Secretary of State Seward (who had been gravely wounded by the conspirators against Lincoln's government), meaning that Gideon Welles, John Palmer Usher, and William Dennison Jr. would also have been present.

McCulloch, who served as Treasury Secretary for the remainder of Johnson's term described the ceremony in his 1888 memoir:

The conduct of Mr. Johnson favorably impressed those who were present when the oath was administered to him. He was griefstricken like the rest, and he seemed to be oppressed by the suddenness of the call upon him to become President of the great nation which had been deprived by an assassin of its tried and honored chief; but he was, nevertheless, calm and self-possessed. He requested the members of the Cabinet to remain with him after the Chief Justice and the other witnesses of the ceremony had retired, and he expressed to each and all of us his desire that we should stand by him in his difficult and responsible position. This desire was expressed in the language of entreaty, and he appeared to be relieved when he was assured that while we felt it to be our duty to him to place our resignations in his hands, he should have the benefit of such services as we could render until he saw fit to dispense with them. Our conference with him was short, but when we left him, the unfavorable impression which had been made upon us by the reports of his unfortunate speech when he took the Vice-President's chair had under gone a considerable change. We all felt as we left him, not entirely relieved of apprehensions, but at least hopeful that he would prove to be a popular and judicious President. The hopes of none of us were fully realized as time went on and controversies arose between him and Congress; but his first year's administration was cordially supported by every member of his Cabinet.

— Hugh McCulloch, 1888

== Ad hoc inaugural address ==
Per the New York Times, Johnson's first statement, which served as an inaugural address under the circumstances, was as follows:

ADDRESS OF PRESIDENT JOHNSON. "Gentlemen, I must be permitted, to say that I have been almost overwhelmed by the announcement of the sad event which has so recently occurred. I feel incompetent to perform duties so important and responsible as those which have been so unexpectedly thrown upon me. As to an indication of any policy which may be presented by me in the administration of the government. I have to say that that must be left for development as the Administration progresses. The message or declaration must be made by the acts as they transpire. The only assurance that I can now give of the future is by reference to the past. The course which I have taken in the past in connection with this rebellion, must be regarded as a guarantee of the future. My past public life, which has been long and laborious, has been founded as I, in good conscience believe, upon a great principle of right, which lies at the basis of all things. The best energies of my life have been spent in endeavoring to establish and perpetuate the principles of free government, and I believe that the government, in passing through its present trials, will settle down upon principles consonant with popular rights, more permanent and enduring than heretofore. I must be permitted to say, if I understand the feelings of my own heart, I have long labored to ameliorate and alleviate the condition of the great mass of the American people. Toil and an honest advocacy of the great principles of free government have been my lot. The duties have been mine—the consequences are God's. This has been the foundation of my political creed. I feel that in the end the government will triumph, and that these great principles will be permanently established. In conclusion, gentlemen, let me say that I want your encouragement and countenance. I shall ask and rely upon you and others in carrying the government through its present perils. I feel in making this request that it will be heartily responded to by you and all other patriots and lovers of the rights and interests of a free people.

According to James G. Blaine, this statement was poorly received. In his memoirs published in the 1880s, Blaine wrote, "The effect produced upon the public by this speech, which might be regarded as an Inaugural address, was not happy. Besides its evasive character respecting public policies which every observing man noted with apprehension, an unpleasant impression was created by its evasive character respecting Mr. Lincoln. The entire absence of eulogy of the slain President was remarked...While he found no time to praise one whose praise was on every tongue, he made ample reference to himself and his own past history. Though speaking not more than five minutes, it was noticed that I and my and me were mentioned at least a score of times."

== Senator Stewart's account (1908) ==
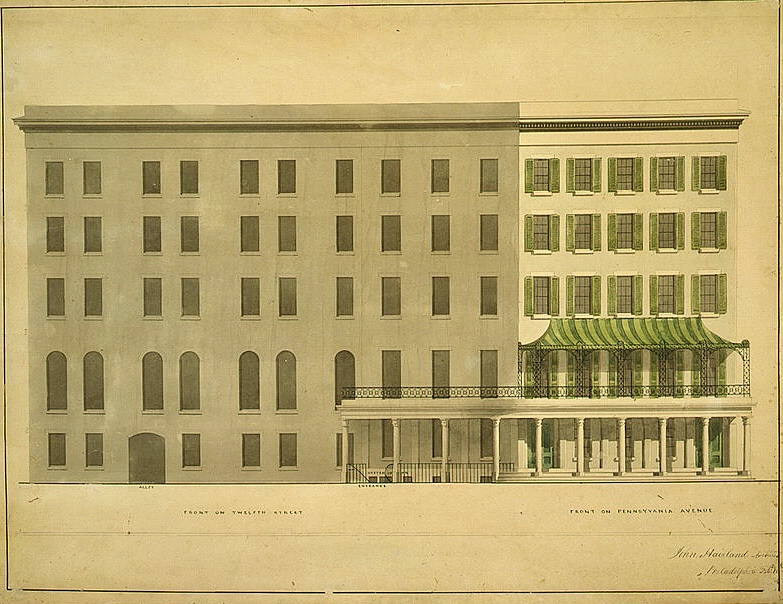
This 1847 architectural drawing is the only known depiction of the exterior of Kirkwood House

According to Nevada Senator William Morris Stewart's telling in his memoir of 1908, there were but three witnesses to Johnson's inauguration (Stewart himself, Chief Justice Chase, and Senator Foot of Vermont) and "all statements to the contrary are absolutely false." (Note: There is a strange paucity of eyewitness accounts of Johnson's swearing-in.) Stewart claimed that Johnson had been in a "half-drunken stupor" since he arrived in Washington, D.C. in "January or February" 1865 and continued drinking following the debacle at the Capitol, and made at least one speech to a "great crowd of street hoodlums and darkies congregated...about the City Hall steps. He was intoxicated...It was quite common for Johnson to make these open-air speeches; and as he delivered them whenever he had been drinking, naturally he became the most persistent orator in the capital."

According to Stewart, after the death of Lincoln, Chase, Foot, and Stewart found Johnson in his rooms at Kirkwood House.

After some little delay Johnson opened the door and we entered. The Vice-President was in his bare feet, and only partially dressed, as though he had hurriedly drawn on a pair of trousers and a shirt. He was occupying two little rooms about ten feet square, and we entered one of them, a sitting-room, while he finished his toilet in the other. ¶ In a few minutes Johnson came in, putting on a very rumpled coat, and presenting the appearance of a drunken man. He was dirty, shabby, and his hair was matted, as though with mud from the gutter, while he blinked at us through squinting eyes, and lurched around unsteadily. He had been on a "bender" for a month.

According to Stewart, Johnson's response to the news that he was to be sworn in was "I'm ready."

Then, per Stewart again, after going to find Secretary of War Edwin Stanton and informing him of the state of the President:

Stanton and I were driven back to the Kirkwood House, and, accompanied by the coachman, we went directly to Johnson's room. He was lying down. We aroused him, dressed him as well as we could, led him down stairs, and put him in Stanton's carriage. We took him to the White House, and Stanton sent for a tailor, a barber, and a doctor. He had a dose administered, and the President was bathed and shaved, his hair was cut, and a new suit of clothes was fitted to him. He did not, however, get into a condition to be visible until late in the afternoon, when a few persons were permitted to see him to satisfy themselves that there was a President in the White House.

Stewart's account was disputed at length by Tennessee Representative Walter P. Brownlow (a nephew of Johnson's old political enemy Parson Brownlow) in an article the following year. Brownlow had the article entered into the Congressional Record of February 25, 1909. (Note: Per Miller, Zachary A. (2022). False Idol: The Memory of Andrew Johnson and Reconstruction in Greeneville, Tennessee 1869–2022 (Thesis). Paper 4096. the article was originally published as Brownlow, Walter P. (September 1908). "Defense and Vindication of Andrew Johnson". The Taylor-Trotwood Magazine. p. 493.) Brownlow's rebuttals included:

- if the story were true it would have been revealed at the contentious impeachment hearings
- Johnson was always known to be an immaculate dresser (fact check: true), so he couldn't have been disheveled that morning
- Johnson did not move into the White House until six weeks after Lincoln's death (fact check: true) so he couldn't have been taken to the White House to be cleaned up and have meetings
- Salmon P. Chase was a "consistent member of church and it is defamation of his character to say that he would have consented to administer to Johnson the oath had he been in the condition Stewart falsely says he was."

Brownlow also pointed to an account by Lincoln and Johnson's Treasury Secretary Hugh McCulloch that repeated the traditional account of Cabinet members and Senators and stated that Johnson's hand rested on Proverbs 22 and 23 when, "with all due solemnity," he took the oath. McCulloch has been described as "the only real defender of Johnson." James G. Blaine also repeats the standard version, although in his account, the swearing of the oath was attended by all of Lincoln's cabinet except Secretary of State Seward (who had been gravely wounded by the conspirators against Lincoln's government), meaning that Gideon Welles, John Palmer Usher, and William Dennison Jr. would also have been present.

== Other accounts ==
After Booth shot Lincoln, Johnson was summoned by Leonard J. Farwell, who also boarded at the Kirkwood. Together they visited the house where Lincoln lay dying. (Mary Todd Lincoln despised Johnson, and out of respect for her circumstances, Johnson's visit was brief.) In 1875 Johnson told a Tennessee compatriot, "It was evident from the first that Booth's shot would prove fatal. I walked the floor all night long, feeling a responsibility greater than I had ever felt before. More than one hundred times I said to myself, what course must I pursue, so that the calm and correct historian will say one hundred years from now, 'He pursued the right course'? I knew that I would have to contend against the mad passions of some and self-aggrandizement of others."

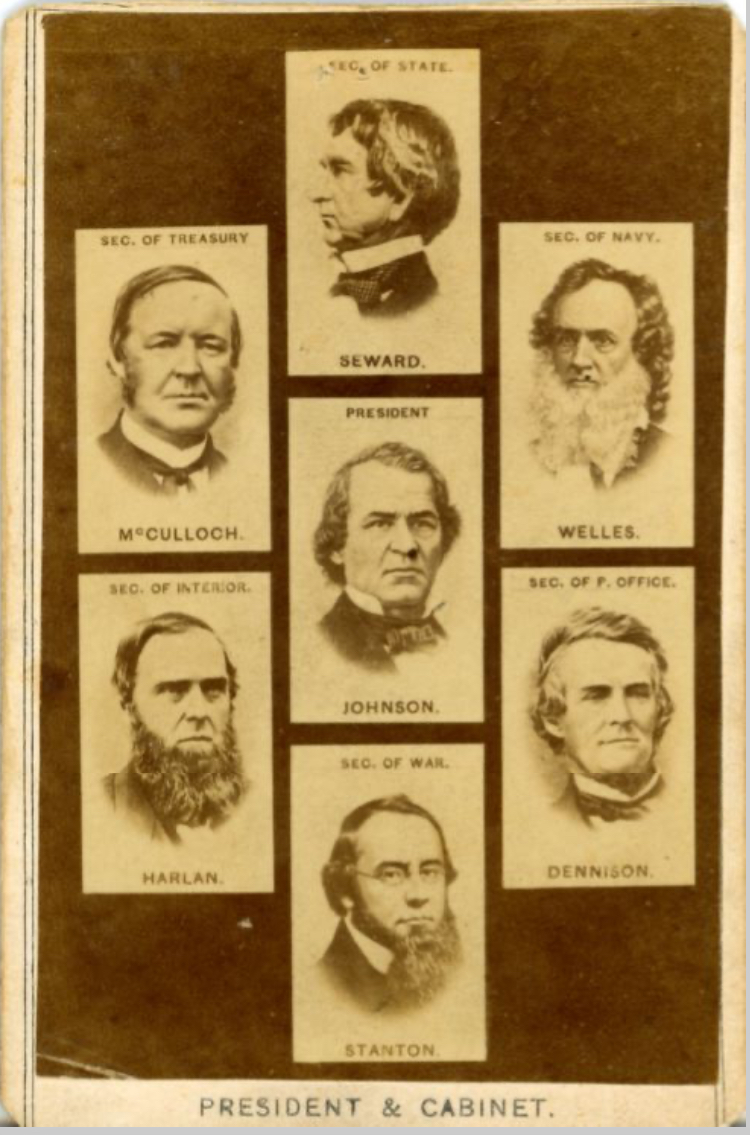
Carte de visite depicting President Johnson and some of his original secretaries, before an 1866 Cabinet shakeup

According to a 1928 biographer named Robert W. Winston, who was granted access to the Johnson papers by his grandson Andrew Johnson Patterson, the newly elevated President kissed the Bible at verse 21 of Ezekiel 11. (Note: In the King James Bible this line reads, "But as for them whose heart walketh after the heart of their detestable things and their abominations, I will recompense their way upon their own heads, saith the Lord God.")

According to historians Dorothy Kunhardt and Philip B. Kunhardt in 1965, "Stanton ran the country single-handedly for the first days after the assassination, and no one looked to the newly sworn-in Johnson to make decisions. Johnson merely received delegations at the Treasury Building, seemed to mention the name Lincoln very seldom, and assured people he would punish treason."

== See also ==
- Presidency of Andrew Johnson
- Reconstruction era
- Andrew Johnson alcoholism debate
- Andrew Johnson's drunk vice-presidential inaugural address
- Bibliography of Andrew Johnson
