= Tenure of Office Act (1820) =

The Tenure of Office Act of 1820, also known as the Four Years' Law, was passed on May 15, 1820, by the United States Congress, and purported to be "an Act to limit the term of office of certain officers therein named, and for other purposes". The author of the law was Secretary of the Treasury William H. Crawford; it was introduced into the Senate by Mahlon Dickerson of New Jersey.

The Act imposed tenure limits on officeholders, and ensured their removal under certain conditions. Congress asserted a right to remove officers, ostensibly to create a blank slate for incoming presidents as well as to weed out poor performers. The law encroached on executive authority by replacing the previous powers of the executive. (Previously, the president determined tenures for public officers like district attorneys, naval officers, and tax collectors.)

== Background ==
Former president James Madison argued that the Four Years' Law of 1820 was unconstitutional because the four-year limit was arbitrary and a precedent that could enable Congress to limit office tenure to as short as a day. Though a loss of executive power was feared, these limited terms frequently served to benefit the presidency. President Andrew Jackson enforced this law believing a system of rotation in office was a democratic reform and would make civil service responsible to the popular will. Efforts to challenge this law took place during Jackson's presidency starting in 1830. When the Senate considered a bill to repeal the Four Years' Law on February 13, 1835, Senator Samuel Southard argued that by allowing the president to renominate officers for another term once their current one ended, the act encouraged corruption. He stated:

...every four years...the officers appointed under it were to go out of office if not reappointed. Now, these officers would feel themselves dependent on the executive, who had the power to leave them out or renominate them. Every man [acts] on the principle that he is to support the man who will keep him in office

Due to Congress' lack of public comment regarding the matter, the eventual results of these debates were never disclosed. The act was replaced in 1867 and lasted 20 years.

== See also ==
- Tenure of Office Act (1867)
- Decision of 1789, House of Representatives debate during the 1st Congress as to whether the president has the power to remove officers of the United States at will.
