= Kirkwood House (Washington, D.C.) =

Washington, D.C. hotel (1848–1874)

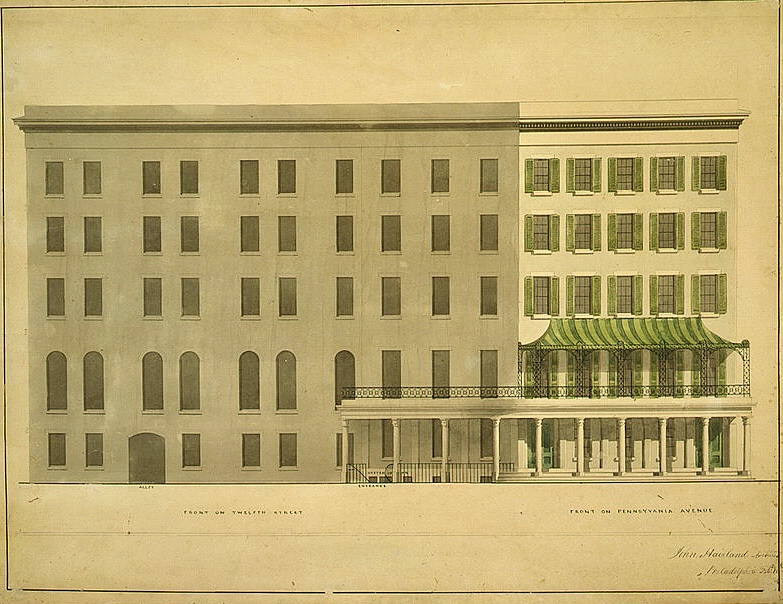
- 1847 elevation view of Fuller's Hotel, the building that would later become Kirkwood House (Library of Congress)
- Interactive map of the Kirkwood House area

General information
- Coordinates: 38.8954°N 77.0278°W
- Opened: 1848
- Demolished: 1874

Technical details
- Floor count: 5
- Floor area: 7,362 ft^{2} (684.0 m^{2})

Design and construction
- Architect: John Haviland

Kirkwood House was a 19th-century building in Washington, D.C., located at the northeast corner of the intersection of 12th Street NW and Pennsylvania Avenue. Opened in 1848, it was initially called Fuller House, and then the Irving Hotel, before becoming known as the Kirkwood House in 1854. Kirkwood House was the site of the inauguration of Andrew Johnson as President of the United States following the assassination of Abraham Lincoln in 1865. The building was demolished in 1874.

== History ==
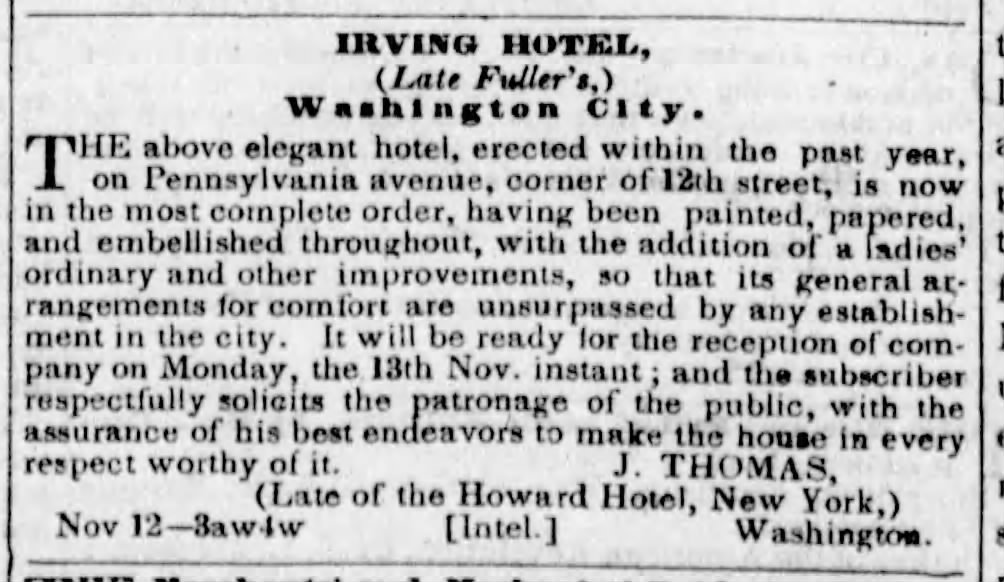
"Irving Hotel (Late Fuller's) Washington City." Washington Union, November 26, 1848

An inn stood at the site that became Kirkwood House as early as the 1820s. The building that became Kirkwood House was designed for Azariah Fuller by architect John Haviland and opened to the public on December 1, 1847. A. and E. H. Fuller had previously operated a Fuller's Hotel at 14th and Pennsylvania Avenue.

The name was shortly thereafter changed to Irving House or the Irving Hotel. In 1849, Millard Fillmore and his family were to stay at the Irving Hotel after leaving the White House while attending Zachary Taylor's inauguration and festivities before leaving the city.

In 1853, Senator William Upham of Vermont died of smallpox at Irving House, and this apparently prompted a name change and/or a change of ownership. After an apparent brief interlude as French's Hotel, the building was closed up for a time and then acquired and renovated by the "Messrs. Kirkwood." The interior was repainted white (previously having been a dull red), and new furniture was made of rosewood and green velvet. The Kirkwoods installed gas lighting and new furnaces for heat. They slightly rearranged the ground floor, the resulting layout had an office for the managers, a large public room, and a barroom. "Inconvenient staircases and passages" were restructured. Above, perhaps on the second floor, there was a ladies' room, which was wallpapered and had a frescoed ceiling. Also upstairs were two dining rooms, a reading room, reception rooms, and "lounging-saloons." Purpose-built coaches were organized to collect guests from the railroad station and steamboat wharves. The renovated building was reopened for business as the Kirkwood House, with 110 rooms available for guests, on Monday, July 3, 1854.

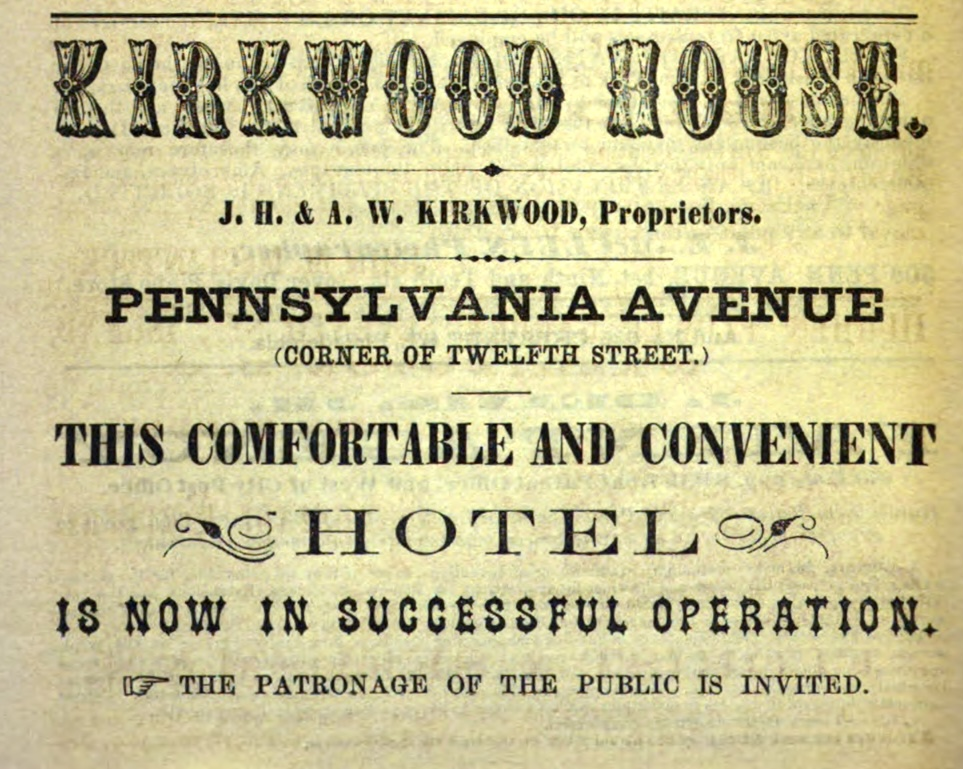
Kirkwood House advertisement in 1858 edition of Boyd's directory of Washington, D.C.

Circa 1859, the Kirkwood was recommended for "the more retiring and unostentatious...The limited capacity and admirable regulations of this establishment give it much of the quiet of a well-ordered private family." During the Lincoln administration, Kirkwood's was considered one of the principal hotels of the city, along with Willard's, the National, and the Metropolitan, all located along Pennsylvania Avenue. Circa 1864, J. H. Kirkwood and A. W. Kirkwood sold out and moved to Cleveland, Ohio, where they took over management of the Weddell House, supposedly called the "Astor House of the Lakes." The Kirkwood House hotel then came under the control of one Christopher C. Sprague (and company). In 1864, Sprague advertised in the Boyd's Directory for Washington, D.C. that "The comfortable and convenient hotel, long established and well known, is still in operation. The patronage of the public is invited." Circa 1865, it would have cost between $3 and $4.50 a day to stay at a place like the Kirkwood in D.C.

As Vice President of the United States under Lincoln, Andrew Johnson made Kirkwood House his residence in Washington, D.C. Vice President Johnson apparently had a ground-floor suite at the hotel at the time of Lincoln's assassination. According to Leslie's Illustrated News Johnson took the oath of office, administered by Salmon P. Chase, in a room called the small parlor.

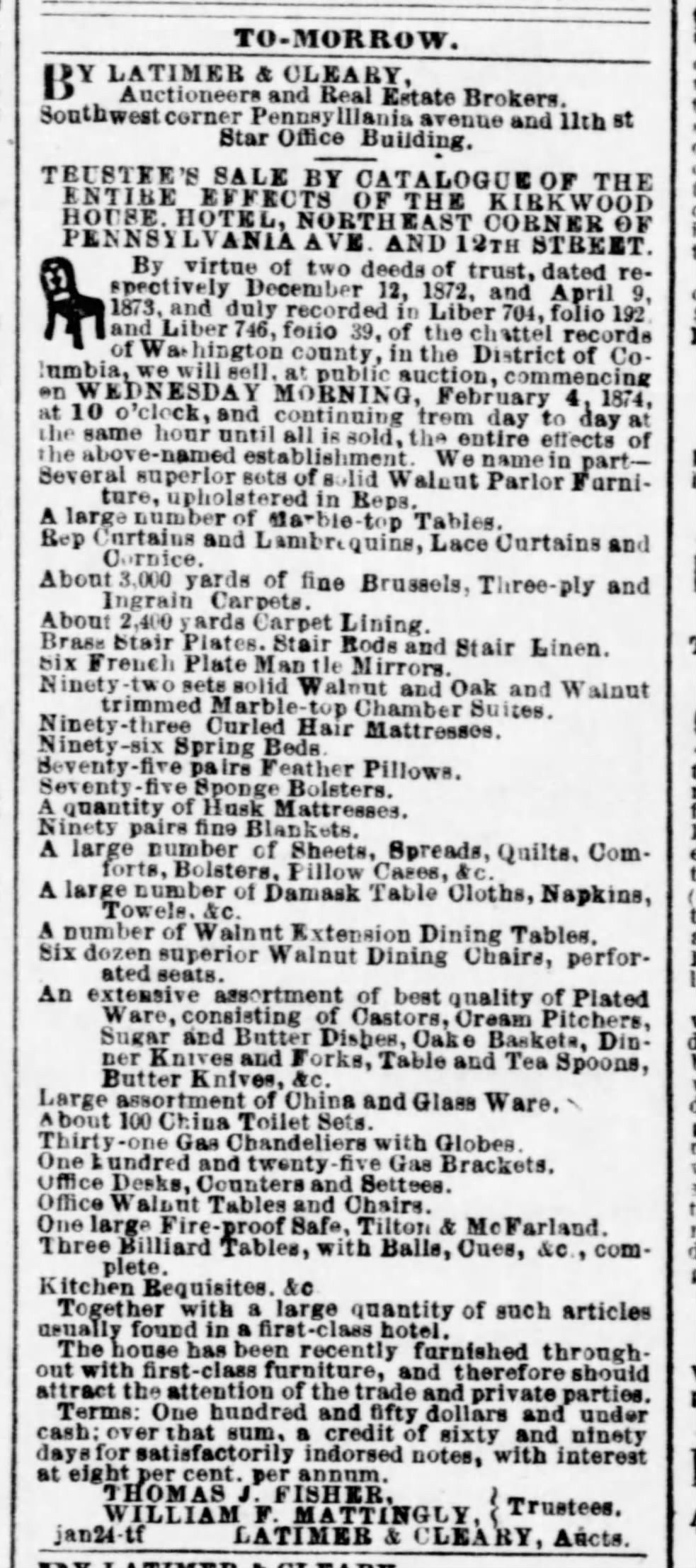
"To-Morrow, by Latimer & Cleary: Trustee's Sale of the Entire Effects of the Kirkwood House" (Evening Star, February 4, 1874)

By 1868 the building had changed hands again; a D.C. tourist guide described it at that time: "It contains about 200 rooms, and can accommodate about 350 guests. It is spacious, elegantly appointed, and its table and attendance is altogether unexceptionable. These, with the advantage of its central location, will always render the Kirkwood a distinguished and fashionable resort. Hendley & Greene, proprietors."

In spring 1874 the Kirkwood was put up for sale to real-estate investors. The footprint of the building was said to be 7,362 ft^{2} (684.0 m^{2}) and there were about 120 rooms. Demolition of the Kirkwood took place in November 1874. By January 1875 workers were excavating the site for a new building foundation. The Kirkwood was replaced with the Centennial Building, which in turn became the Raleigh Hotel. The Raleigh stood until 1966 when it was taken down and replaced with an office building.
