= Tenure of Office Act (1867) =

Federal United States law

- Long title: An act regulating the tenure of certain civil offices
- Enacted by: the 39th United States Congress

Citations
- Public law: Pub. L. 39–154
- Statutes at Large: 14 Stat. 430

Legislative history
- Introduced in the Senate as S. 453 by George Henry Williams (R-OR) on December 3, 1866; Committee consideration by Committee on Retrenchment; Passed the Senate on January 18, 1867 (29-9); Passed the House on February 2, 1867 (111-38) with amendment; Reported by the joint conference committee on February 18, 1867; agreed to by the Senate on February 4, 1867 (24-15); Senate agreed to House amendment on February 18, 1867 (22-10) with further amendment; House agreed to Senate amendment on February 18, 1867 (112-41); Vetoed by President Andrew Johnson on March 2, 1867; Overridden by the House of Representatives on March 2, 1867 (134-37); Overridden by the Senate and became law on March 2, 1867 (35-11)

Major amendments
- 49th U.S. Congress repealed March 3, 1887; P.L. 49-353, 24 Stat. 500, March 3, 1887

The Tenure of Office Act was a United States federal law, in force from 1867 to 1887, that was intended to restrict the power of the president to remove certain office-holders without the approval of the U.S. Senate. The law was enacted March 2, 1867, over the veto of President Andrew Johnson. It purported to deny the president the power to remove any executive officer who had been appointed by the president with the advice and consent of the Senate, unless the Senate approved the removal during the next full session of Congress.

Johnson's attempt to remove Secretary of War Edwin Stanton from office without the Senate's approval led to the impeachment of Johnson in early 1868 for violating the act.

The act was significantly amended by Congress on April 5, 1869, under President Ulysses S. Grant. Congress repealed the act in its entirety in 1887, 20 years after the law was enacted. While evaluating the constitutionality of a similar law in Myers v. United States (1926), the Supreme Court stated that the Tenure of Office Act was likely invalid.

== Background ==
The notion of the United States Senate advising and consenting the removal of Cabinet members to the same of the appointments were considered during the 1st United States Congress. The vote was tied with 9 in favor and 9 against on July 18, 1789. Vice President John Adams, with his first tie-breaking vote, voted against the bill, defeating it.

The Constitution adopted by the Confederate States of America was more explicit on the point, providing in Article II, Section 2, Clause 3 thereof, that "The principal officer in each of the Executive Departments, and all persons connected with the diplomatic service, may be removed from office at the pleasure of the President. All other civil officers of the Executive Departments may be removed at any time by the President, or other appointing power, when their services are unnecessary, or for dishonesty, incapacity, inefficiency, misconduct, or neglect of duty; and when so removed, the removal shall be reported to the Senate, together with the reasons therefor."

In the post-Civil War political environment, President Johnson, a Democrat who had served as Abraham Lincoln's second vice president, endorsed the quick re-admission of the Southern secessionist states. The two-thirds Republican majorities of both houses of Congress passed laws over Johnson's vetoes, establishing a series of five military districts overseeing newly created state governments. This "Congressional Reconstruction" was designed to create local civil rights laws to protect newly freed slaves; to protect and patrol the area; to ensure the secessionist states would show some good faith before being readmitted; to ensure Republican control of the states; and, arguably, to inflict some punishment on the secessionists. States would be readmitted gradually.

Overpowered politically, Johnson could apply the sole check to the Congressional Reconstruction plan of his control (as commander-in-chief) of the military, which would be the primary institution enforcing the plan's provisions. Even Johnson's control of the military was inhibited by the fact that his Secretary of War, Edwin Stanton, was a staunch Radical Republican who supported Congressional Reconstruction in full. This further set Johnson against the Republican-controlled Congress, with Johnson wanting to remove Stanton from office and Congress wanting to keep him in place.

George F. Edmunds played an important role in the passage of the Tenure of Office Act in the Senate.

== Stanton and impeachment of Johnson ==
The Tenure of Office Act restricted the power of the president to suspend an officer while the Senate was not in session. At that time, Congress sat during a relatively small portion of the year. If, when the Senate reconvened, it declined to ratify the removal, the president would be required to reinstate the official.

In August 1867, with the Senate out of session, Johnson made his move against Stanton, suspending him pending the next session of the Senate. When the Senate convened on January 13, 1868, it refused to ratify the removal by a vote of 35–6. Notwithstanding the vote, on February 22, 1868, President Johnson attempted to replace Stanton with Lorenzo Thomas because he wanted, by such action, to create a case through which to challenge the legitimacy of the Act before the Supreme Court. Proceedings began within days to move toward the impeachment of Johnson, the first impeachment of a United States President. After a three-month trial, Johnson narrowly avoided removal from office by the Senate by a single vote. Stanton resigned in May 1868.

It was unclear whether Johnson had violated the Tenure of Office Act which led up to the impeachment. The act's phrasing was murky, and it was not clear whether his removal of Stanton (a holdover from the Lincoln administration whom Johnson had not appointed) violated the Act. While the Act, by its terms, applied to current office holders, it also limited the protection offered to Cabinet members to one month after a new president took office.

== Later use ==
The act was amended on April 5, 1869, one month and one day after Republican president Ulysses S. Grant assumed the presidency. The revisions grew out of an attempt to completely repeal the 1867 Act. The measure to repeal passed the House of Representatives with only 16 negative votes but failed in the Senate. The new provisions were significantly less onerous, allowing the president to suspend office holders "in his discretion" and designate replacements while the Senate was in recess, subject only to confirmation of the replacements at the next session. The president no longer had to report his reasons for suspension to the Senate, and the Senate could no longer force reinstatement of suspended office holders.

Although Grant, in his first message to Congress, in December 1869, urged the repeal of even the revised act, it did not cause further problems until the election of Democrat Grover Cleveland in 1884. Under the spoils system it had long been accepted practice for the administration of a new party to replace current office holders with party faithful. Cleveland, a supporter of a civil service system, had promised to avoid wholesale replacements, vowing to replace incumbents only for cause. When he suspended several hundred office holders for cause, Senate committees requested information from cabinet members regarding the reasons for the suspensions, which Cleveland refused to provide. If he had simply said that the incumbents were being replaced for political reasons, the Senate would have complied, but Cleveland would not do so. When, in early 1886, the Senate as a whole demanded information regarding the conduct of the suspended U.S. Attorney for southern Alabama, Cleveland sent a message to Congress explaining his position opposing impingement of independence of the executive. Cleveland's replacement nominee was eventually confirmed when it was discovered that the suspended incumbent's term had expired in the meantime anyway. The Tenure of Office Act was formally repealed in 1887.

== Constitutionality ==
In 1926, a similar law (though not dealing with Cabinet secretaries) was ruled unconstitutional by the United States Supreme Court in the case of Myers v. United States, which affirmed the ability of the president to remove a Postmaster without Congressional approval. In reaching that decision, the Supreme Court stated in its majority opinion (though in dicta), "that the Tenure of Office Act of 1867, insofar as it attempted to prevent the president from removing executive officers who had been appointed by him by and with the advice and consent of the Senate, was invalid".

== See also ==
- Tenure of Office Act (1820)
- Decision of 1789, House of Representatives debate during the 1st Congress as to whether the president the power to remove officers of the United States at will.
