= Andrew Johnson's drunken vice-presidential inaugural address =

1865 speech by Andrew Johnson

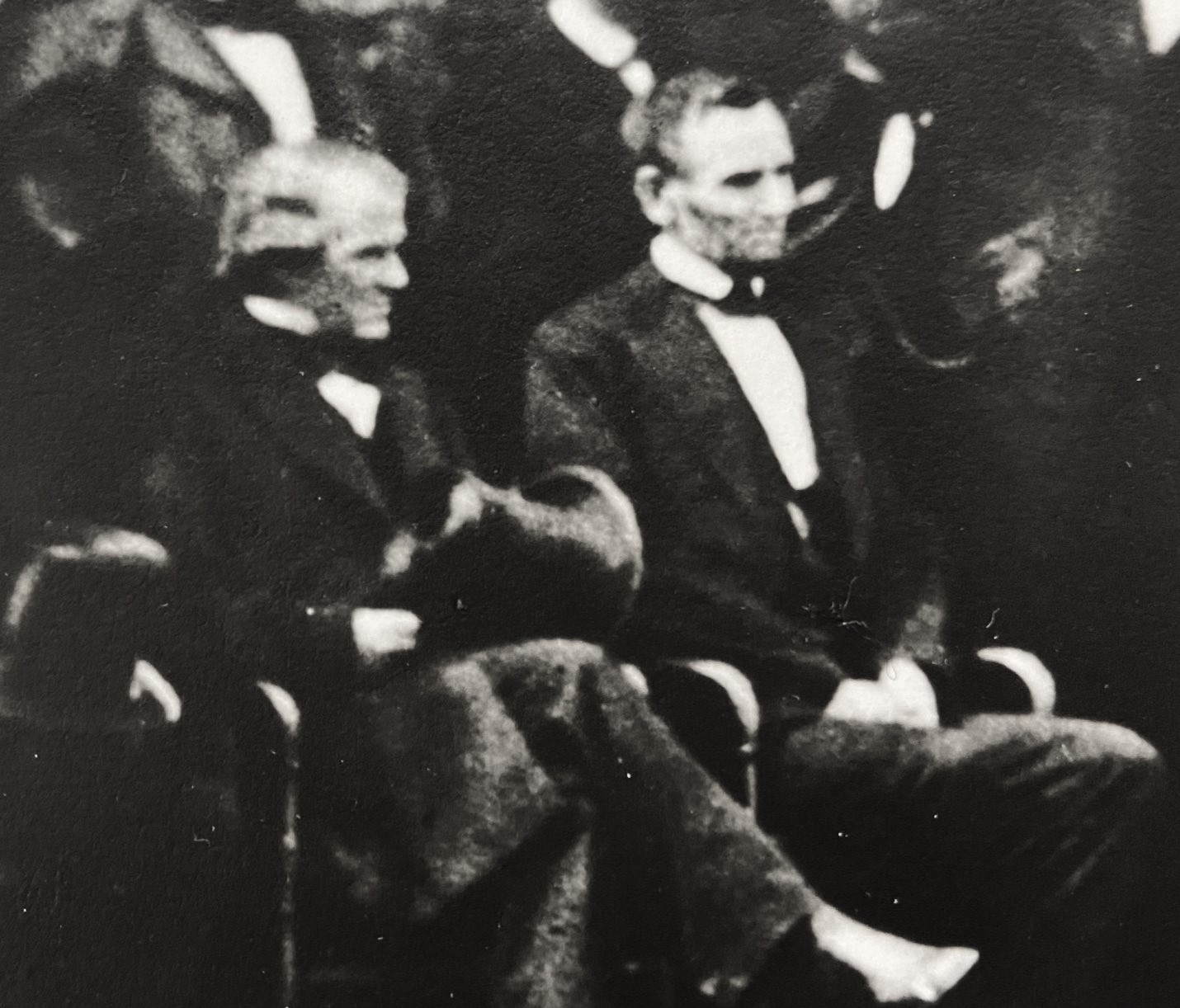
- Andrew Johnson (left) with Abraham Lincoln (right) on the day of their inauguration, seated outdoors on the East Portico of the United States Capitol
- Date: March 4, 1865
- Location: Senate chamber, United States Capitol, Washington, District of Columbia

Andrew Johnson was drunk when he made his inaugural address as vice president of the United States on March 4, 1865. Multiple sources suggest Johnson had been under the influence for at least a week prior to the inauguration, that he drank heavily the night before the inauguration, and that he consumed either three glasses of whiskey or a glass of French brandy the morning of the ceremony. Correspondents for the Times of London, Washington Star, New York Herald, New-York Tribune, and the Cincinnati Enquirer variously described Johnson's speech as hostile, inane, incoherent, repetitive, self-aggrandizing, and sloppy. He kissed the Bible when he took the oath of office and in his drunken state was unable to administer the oath of office to incoming United States Senators. The incident was partially covered up, and newspapers selectively glossed over the speech or claimed it could not be clearly heard. There are no substantive claims in either primary or secondary sources that Johnson was sober at his inauguration as Lincoln's vice-president; some later biographers claimed the incident was the result of an unlucky one-off overdose of medicinal whiskey, unrepresentative of Johnson's conduct generally.

There is no known surviving transcript of Johnson's address. The editors of the Congressional Globe were persuaded to use a more dignified fantasy rendition of the speech. Lincoln was present for the second half of the speech and on the way to his own swearing-in told the inaugural marshal not to let Johnson speak outside. Lincoln later pointed out to Johnson that Frederick Douglass was in the audience; Douglass described Johnson's reaction and his drunkenness in his third autobiography, Life and Times of Frederick Douglass. Among many other accounts of the speech, the Secretary of the Navy, Gideon Welles, described Johnson as "drunk" in his diary, later striking out that single word and replacing it with "under the influence of stimulants."

Both the United States Cabinet and U.S. Congress expressed concern but took no action against Johnson, although as a direct consequence of the speech the U.S. Senate did remove two Senators from committee work due to their chronic drinking problems. A parodic song about the incident was performed at Grover's Theater in Washington. According to multiple sources, Johnson spent most of the following month sobering up at the Maryland home of the Blair family. Lincoln dismissed the matter at that time, and the political climate in the final days of the American Civil War made the story of tertiary national importance.

The incident presaged some of Johnson's difficulties when he succeeded to the presidency 42 days later, following the assassination of Abraham Lincoln. Official Washington initially rallied in support of the new resident of the Oval Office, but Johnson never lived down the public humiliation, which seriously eroded whatever political capital he had accumulated. During the impeachment process Thaddeus Stevens quipped, "I don't want to hurt the man's feelings by telling him he is a rascal. I'd rather put it mildly, and say he hasn't got off that inaugural drunk yet, and just let him retire to get sobered." Reconstruction-era political commentary and editorial cartoons often included references to Johnson's alleged alcoholism. In the 21st century, historians like Elizabeth Varon at the University of Virginia, and Annette Gordon-Reed at Harvard University, evince no doubt that Johnson "looked and sounded drunk" that day, with one scholar describing Johnson in an academic study of presidential rhetoric as having been, by all accounts, "plastered."

== Background ==
Abraham Lincoln's first vice president was Hannibal Hamlin from Maine. However, when Lincoln's prospects in the 1864 United States presidential election appeared to be dimming, Lincoln replaced Hamlin with Andrew Johnson, a slave-owning Southern Unionist who was the only member of the U.S. Senate from a secessionist state who stayed loyal to the federal government at the outbreak of the American Civil War. Tennessee under governor Isham G. Harris had initially joined the Confederate States of America, but when the state was restored to the Union in 1862, Lincoln had appointed Johnson to be military governor of Tennessee. Lincoln believed that adding a loyal, populist Jacksonian Democrat like Johnson to the ticket might draw the votes of other War Democrats, and that "a favorable impression would be made upon observers abroad by the selection of the vice president from a reconstructed state in the heart of the Confederacy." The Lincoln and Johnson families also had remote kinship ties and friends in common (for example, Lincoln's uncle Mordecai Lincoln had officiated Johnson's 1827 wedding). (Note: Johnson and Lincoln were both in the 30th Congress (1847–1849). Abraham Lincoln's uncle Mordecai lived in Greeneville, and A. Lincoln's cousin Mary-Sophia Lincoln was married to William R. Brown, a Greeneville merchant. The Lincolns were also very distantly related to the family of Johnson's son-in-law Daniel Stover. (In 1869 Johnson's widowed daughter Mary Johnson Stover married Brown, a widower with several children.)) As one historian put it, Lincoln and his "contemporaries were seduced by a very different Andrew Johnson, who, transformed by the context of disunion, temporarily shed the southern baggage that would come to influence his approach to Reconstruction. This short-term choice and long-term miscalculation would have devastating consequences."

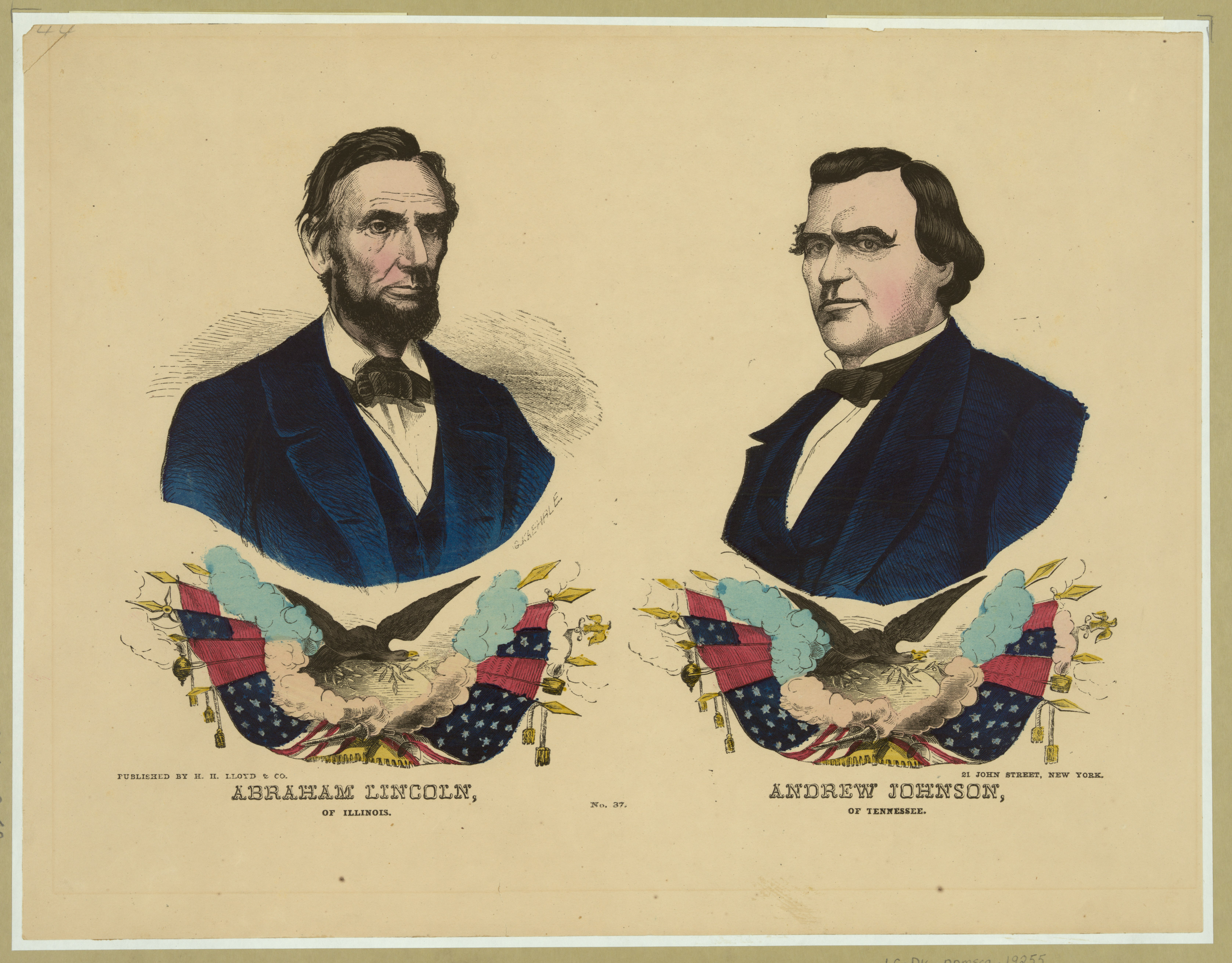
Lincoln-Johnson ticket of the National Union Party, 1864

The Lincoln–Johnson ticket of the National Union Party was successful, re-electing Lincoln and returning Johnson to federal office. In January 1865, Lincoln telegraphed Johnson in Nashville asking when he would be able to come to Washington, D.C. Johnson replied with a request that his inauguration be delayed until after the newly organized Tennessee state government was operational, which would not be until early April. On January 24, 1865, Lincoln replied that he had consulted with the Cabinet, and "it is our unanimous conclusion that it is unsafe for you to not be here on the fourth of March. Be sure to reach here by that time." Johnson was reportedly "ill in Nashville for many weeks" before the inauguration "with a fever that was probably malarial."

== Pre-inaugural week ==
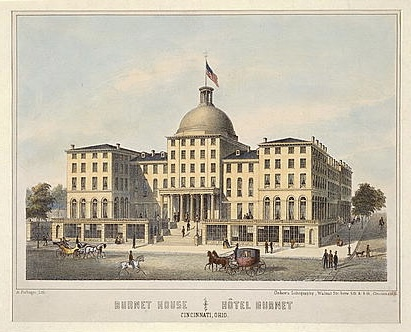
During the American Civil War, Federal soldiers and Unionists visiting Cincinnati, Ohio, typically stayed at the Burnet House hotel, while the Spencer House was known as city's Copperhead hotel. (Library of Congress – 00650892)

Johnson may well have been intoxicated for an extended period of time in the lead-up to the inauguration; in 1885, a former colleague who signed himself "J. L." wrote to The Tennessean: "When he was inaugurated as Vice President on the 4th of March 1865 he had been on one of the most protracted sprees of his life..." Contemporary reports generally described him as having a serious, non-specified illness prior to his move to Washington. Confined to his room with a "severe cold," Johnson had apparently been unable to work for the first half of February 1865. Johnson was still reported to be "seriously ill" in Nashville in the middle of the month. He telegraphed to cancel a planned speaking engagement in New York, and on February 22 received a gracious reply hoping for the restoration of his health. In the Saturday Evening Post in 1929, John Trotwood Moore, citing no source, claimed that Johnson's doctors had told him going to the inauguration "would doubtless be fatal" and that Johnson was "risking his life" by going to Washington. (Note: Perhaps relevant to his presentation of Andrew Johnson's biography, Moore wrote elsewhere of the Reconstruction Amendments: "The three negro amendments to the Constitution giving him citizenship and social equality [were] a greater sin to him and to us than slavery itself.") Johnson set off for the national capital on February 25, a week before the inauguration. None of his family were with him.

He was at the Louisville Hotel in Louisville, Kentucky, on Sunday, February 26. Two days later the Cincinnati Gazette reported that Johnson—who had made an impromptu speech there—seemed "somewhat the worse for the wear and tear of the past year or two" and "did not respond in as clear a voice or, it seemed to us, with as clear a head, as we have heard him on former occasions. It was with difficulty we could hear or understand him at all from where we stood." (Note: According to The Papers of Andrew Johnson, the Gazette reported of Johnson's speech that he said "He was a radical Democrat; none of your pseudo, hermaphroditish Vallandigham Democrats, but a Jacksonian Democrat, opposed to nullification and secession in all their repulsive phases. He had labored all his life for emancipation—not only of the black man, but of the white man." Johnson then expounded on loyalty, criticized Kentucky's rebellion and return to the Union, and "closed by appealing to the people of Cincinnati to stand firmly in the position they have maintained throughout this struggle, for he assured them that in so doing they would reap the reward of faithfulness in the end.") The Cincinnati Enquirer published the following report on Tuesday, February 28:

Yesterday the Vice President elect, Hon. Andrew Johnson, arrived in our city, en route for the scene of his future glories at Washington. In the evening, after a collection had been made by several prominent Republicans in the city, a brass band was hired to serenade the dignitary at the Burnet House. The Hon. Johnson came forward to respond, but appeared to be suffering from severe physical weakness, and could not be long exposed to the keen night air. Our shorthand reporter's notes of the speech, when written out, present such an unintelligible appearance, exhibiting three or four "fellow citizens" on each line, that we must apologize for the Bohemian, and promise Mr. Johnson a better report next time.

Later, the Manitowoc Pilot of Wisconsin forthrightly stated, "At Cincinnati, when Mr. Johnson was passing through on his way to Washington, he was called out for a speech but was too intoxicated to respond. He seems literally to have continued in that state until the time he was installed in his present office."

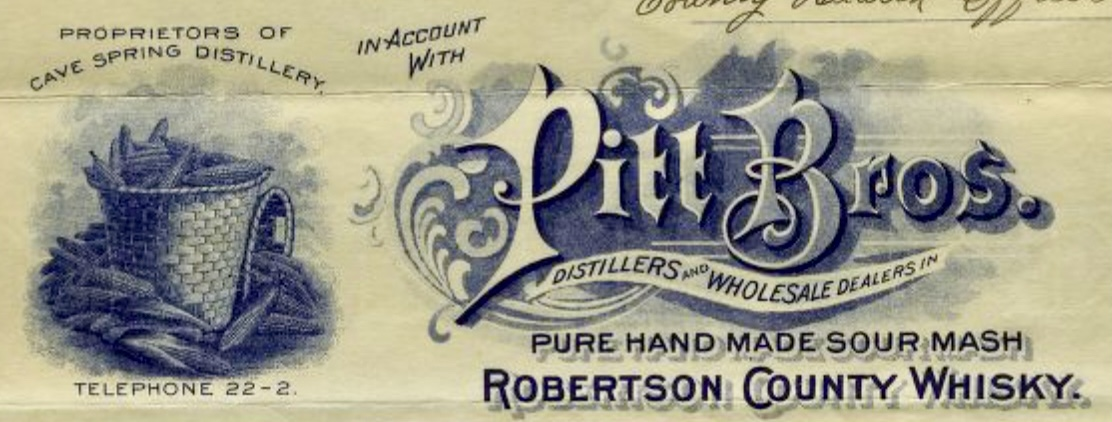
Ben Truman, Johnson's secretary when he was military governor of Tennessee, wrote in 1913 that Johnson abhorred beer, wine, and cocktails, drinking almost solely whisky (preferably Robertson County whisky). In Truman's observation, Johnson drank from zero to four glasses a day. Robertson County, which in the 19th century distilled more whisky than any other county in the state, produced a "distinctive" sour mash whisky that was said to be "similar to, but not quite the same as, Kentucky bourbon." (University of Tennessee Libraries –volvoices3A6503)

After departing Cincinnati, Johnson then traveled east through Pittsburgh, via railroads including the Northern Central Railway. He was traveling in company with his long-time secretary William A. Browning, and several fellow Tennesseans, including General Alvan C. Gillem and future U.S. Senator Joseph S. Fowler (all key staffers during Johnson's military administration of Tennessee). They stopped in Baltimore, dined at the Eutaw House, and then took a special car that departed Camden Depot at 3:30 p.m., delivering them to Washington late afternoon on March 1.

Upon arrival Johnson took rooms at the Metropolitan Hotel. The day after his arrival one newspaper stated that he arrived "in fine spirits and ready to assume his important public duties," while another reported that "the health of Governor Andrew Johnson, of Tennessee, Vice President elect, is improving, but he is still unable to attend to his business." He had apparently secured a "new formal black frockcoat, a silk vest, and doeskin pants" for the occasion of his inauguration. As festivities for the upcoming inauguration got underway, on the evening of March 3, Johnson attended a "lavish" party thrown by John W. Forney, "with whom he shared many glasses of whisky," which reportedly left Johnson with a "thunderous hangover." Another description of this party has it that "the wine flowed as freely as the oratory."

== Pre-ceremony ==
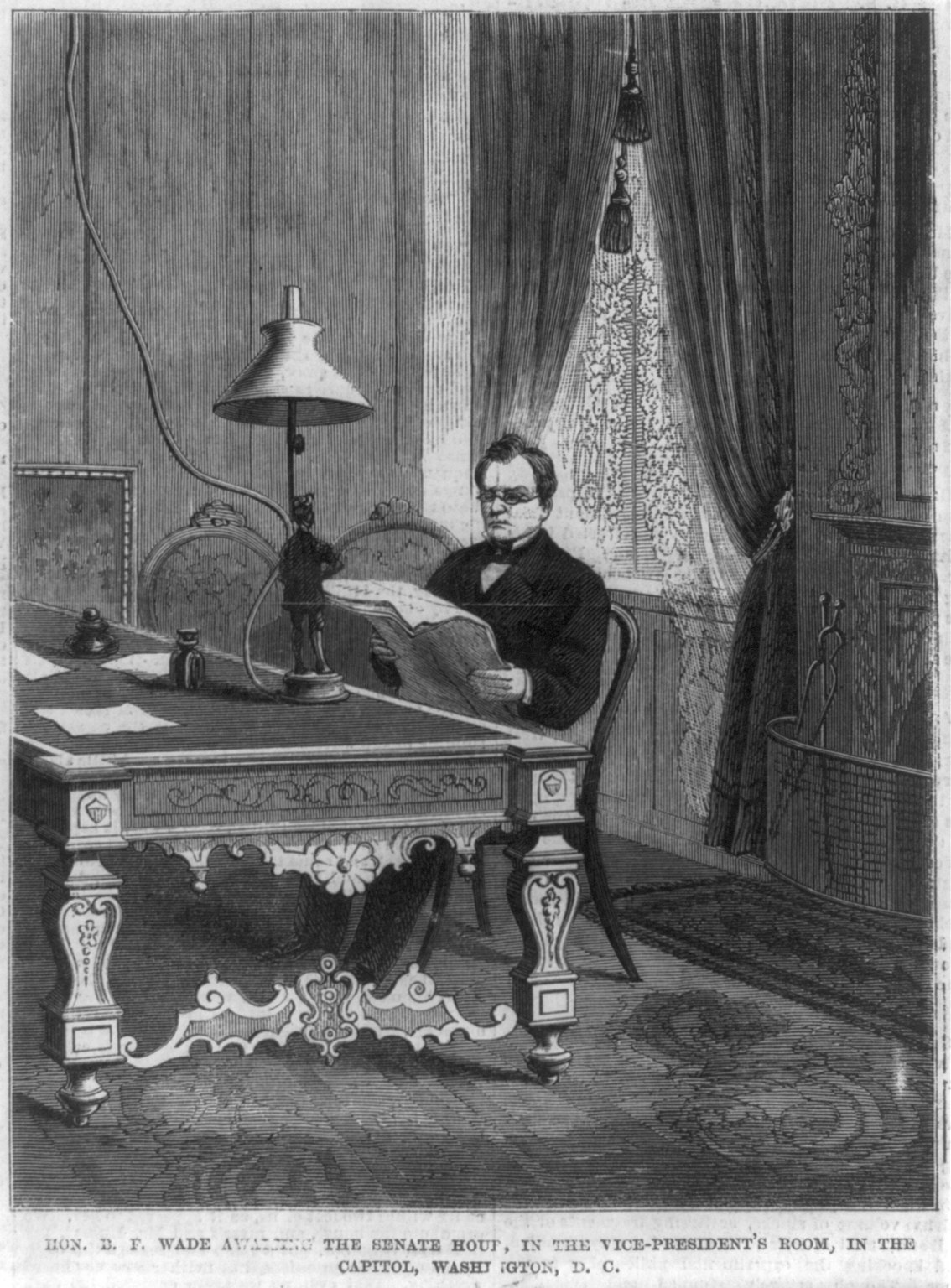
Vice-president's Room in 1868 (Frank Leslie's Illustrated Newspaper via Library of Congress – 2002698339)

On March 4, 1865, Johnson was picked up from his hotel by U.S. Senator James R. Doolittle at 10:30 a.m. and escorted to the Capitol. Johnson was scheduled to be sworn in by Hamlin at approximately noon and to make a seven-minute-long address. (Note: According to Milton's The Age of Hate: Andrew Johnson and the Radicals (1930), from an account provided by then-Representative John H. Rice, a "personal and political friend of Mr. Hamlin", "When the party had entered the Vice President's Room, he remarked to Hamlin: 'I am not fit to be here, and ought not to have left my home, as I was slow recovering from an attack of typhoid fever. But Mr. Lincoln telegraphed me, as did other friends, that I must be here, and I came. I am now very weak and enervated, and require all the strength I can get. Can you give me some good whiskey?' Accordingly, Hamlin sent out for a bottle of whiskey and Johnson 'drank a good potation.' The two remained seated for some minutes, until it was announced that it was time for them to go into the Senate chamber for the ceremony. Johnson said again 'I will take some more of the whiskey, as I need all the strength for the occasion I can have.'")

An account of the morning from a biography of Hannibal Hamlin, written by his grandson Charles Eugene Hamlin and published in 1899, stated that—at what would have been at approximately 11 to 11:30 a.m.—Johnson consumed three full glasses of whisky (unwatered and un-iced). The whisky had been procured at Johnson's specific request, and Johnson almost knocked over 27-year-old Maj. Charles Hamlin as he dashed back to pour himself the third glass.

The Hamlin testimony reads as follows:

When Johnson came to Washington to be inaugurated, he was accompanied by enthusiastic friends and admirers from Tennessee. There was a great deal of drinking and jubilation among them, and Johnson was already on the verge of another spree when the day came for him to be inducted into office. He called at the senate chamber shortly before the hour of inaugural, and found Vice-President Hamlin and General Charles Hamlin waiting for him in the former's private room. There was a cordial conversation, and then Johnson said, 'Mr. Hamlin, I am not well, and need a stimulant. Have you any whiskey?' 'No,' replied Mr. Hamlin, 'when I became Vice-President, I gave an order prohibiting the sale of liquor in the Senate restaurant; but if you desire, I will send across the street for some whiskey.' Mr. Johnson expressed his wish for liquor, and a messenger procured him a bottle. He filled a table glass up to the brim, and drank it down without any water. He then resumed conversation, and began to tell Mr. Hamlin of his ambition to make the effort of his life when taking the oath of office. While talking on this theme, he poured out another glass full to the brim, and rapidly poured that down. Mr. Hamlin afterwards said to his son that this made him a little apprehensive, but knowing that Johnson was a hard drinker, he supposed that he could stand the liquor he had taken. There was up to this time, indeed, nothing to indicate that the whiskey had affected Johnson. A moment later, word was given that it was time for the inaugural procession to start. Vice-President Hamlin offered Mr. Johnson his arm, and they started to leave the room, with General Hamlin following them. They had hardly stepped out of the room when Johnson, excusing himself hurriedly, turned back, almost running into General Hamlin. The general naturally turned around to see what the matter was, and saw Johnson step up to the table where the whiskey was and pour down a third tumblerful. He then hurried back to the Senate chamber and took his seat on the dais.

John B. Henderson, a U.S. Senator who drafted the Thirteenth Amendment and later voted to acquit Johnson on the impeachment charges, wrote an account of the morning that was published in Century Magazine in 1912:

Senator Doolittle, who had escorted the Vice-President elect to the Capitol, told me that when they went into Mr. Hamlin's room Johnson said to the retiring Vice-President: "Mr. Hamlin, I have been feeling very ill. Can you give me some good brandy?" A bottle of French brandy was found, and to brace his nerves for the task before him, he poured out the full glass that wrought the mischief.

Meanwhile, in the Senate chamber, dignitaries found their seats on the floor, and "several hundred women, including Mary Lincoln, and members of the press" made their way to their assigned seats in the gallery above.

== Speech ==
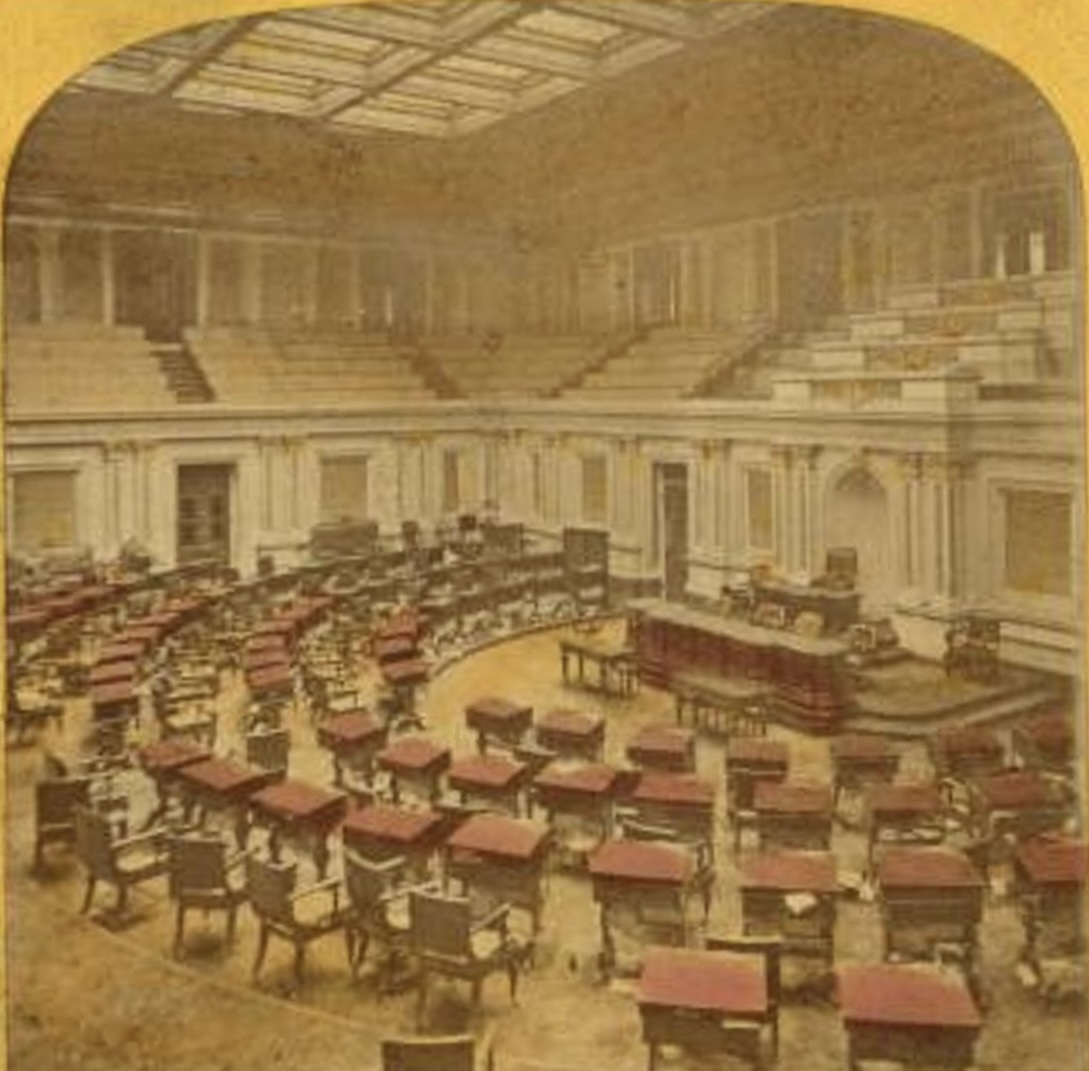
19th-century hand-colored photograph of the Senate Chamber (New York Public Library – b11707701)

Journalist Noah Brooks, present in the press gallery that day, wrote in 1895 that Johnson's face was "extraordinarily red" and that he was "evidently intoxicated." The Washington correspondent of the Cincinnati Commercial wrote, "Drunkenness may be entered as a plea in abatement for him, for he had been crazed with liquor for several preceding days. As he entered the Chamber, his frame shook with the tremor of debauch." According to the Times of London reporter, "He had not uttered two sentences when everyone saw something was wrong." Once he got going, Johnson "proceeded to lecture senators, cabinet members, and justices alike on the fount of power in a democratic society."

The Washington Star report of the speech is a straightforward account that makes no allegations of inebriation but does suggest some incoherence or repetitiveness on the part of Johnson:

Mr. Johnson then came forward on the dais front of the chair and addressed the assembly. He announced it was wholly by the aid of the people that he was there to take the oath as Vice President of the United States, and we were yet a nation. It was not because of your President, your Vice President, your Secretary of State, your Secretary of War, your Secretary of the Navy, or any or all these, because of your Supreme Court Judges, who like the rest, were creatures of the people, that the nation, that the American government, had been preserved. It was because of the people, and because this government was so closely connected with, and was of the people.

He himself was a plebian, and he wished to announce it here to the ministers of foreign governments before him and to this vast multitude that all this power of the nation was because of the people. It was by them and through them that the nation had maintained this great struggle, and was putting down its enemies, and this Union had been and would be maintained. Tennessee was a State of this Union, and he thanked God and the people that she was. The power of the people had made her such, and would keep her so.

He wished to announce this fact, as well as repeat that other general idea of the power and efficiency of our institutions through their popular character. Mr. Johnson, after further enforcing these views, announced himself ready to take the oath of office. He was then sworn by Vice President Hamlin.

Another contemporary account of Andrew Johnson's swearing-in as vice president, as published in a Pennsylvania paper from the "correspondent of the New York Herald, a person sufficiently mendacious to praise Lincoln profusely and ready to go so far as to call his inaugural address eloquent," (meaning that the Herald was known as a relatively liberal, pro-Republican news outlet) reads thus:

[The Senators began] to look at each other with significance as if to say, 'Is he crazy, or what is the matter?' [...] It was not only a ninety-ninth rate stump speech but disgraceful in the extreme [...] the Democratic senators leaned forward and appeared to be chuckling with each other at the figure made by the Republican Party through their Vice President-elect [...] the sentences so incoherent it is impossible to give an accurate report of the speech [...] ("Who is the Secretary of the Navy?"—was then heard, in a voice of less volume. Someone responded 'Mr. Welles'.) [...] 'Has he no friends?' [...] It is charitable to say that his condition was such that he was unfit to make a speech...The effort of the Vice President elect to go through with the form of reading the sentences [of the oath] as read by Mr. Hamlin was painful in the extreme. He stumbled, he stammered, he repeated portions of it several times over [...]

According to historian George F. Milton Jr., by way of U.S. Representative Walter P. Brownlow, by way of his uncle, Tennessee Governor and U.S. Senator William G. Brownlow, at one point Johnson managed to insult all the foreign ambassadors at once when he turned and said, "And you, gentlemen of the Diplomatic Corps, with all your fine feathers and geegaws." The New-York Tribune described the speech as "almost impossible to follow," described wildly varying volume and projection (vacillating between "backwoods" shout and inaudible mumble), and wrote that Johnson "intimated very broadly that Tennessee was personified in Andrew Johnson" and "repeated 'I announce here to-day' at least 20 times in the 20 minutes misused by Mr. Johnson." He sought to explain that Tennessee was a U.S. state "although 'there had been an interregnum, a hiatus.' [...] the Vice President was trying to show off his political vocabulary but he could not put the high-sounding words together to make sense."

The Hamlin biography claims that the outgoing vice president tried to intercede: "Leaning forward quietly, to attract as little attention as possible, Mr. Hamlin took hold of Johnson's coat, pulled it gently, and whispered, 'Johnson, stop!' But this had no effect; Johnson was thoroughly excited, and wound up for a speech." Brooks confirms as much, writing that from the press gallery he could see Hamlin periodically reminding Johnson that it was getting past time for the President's inauguration. There were reportedly audible comments from the audience to the effect of "What a shame!" and "Tell him to stop."

== Oath of office ==
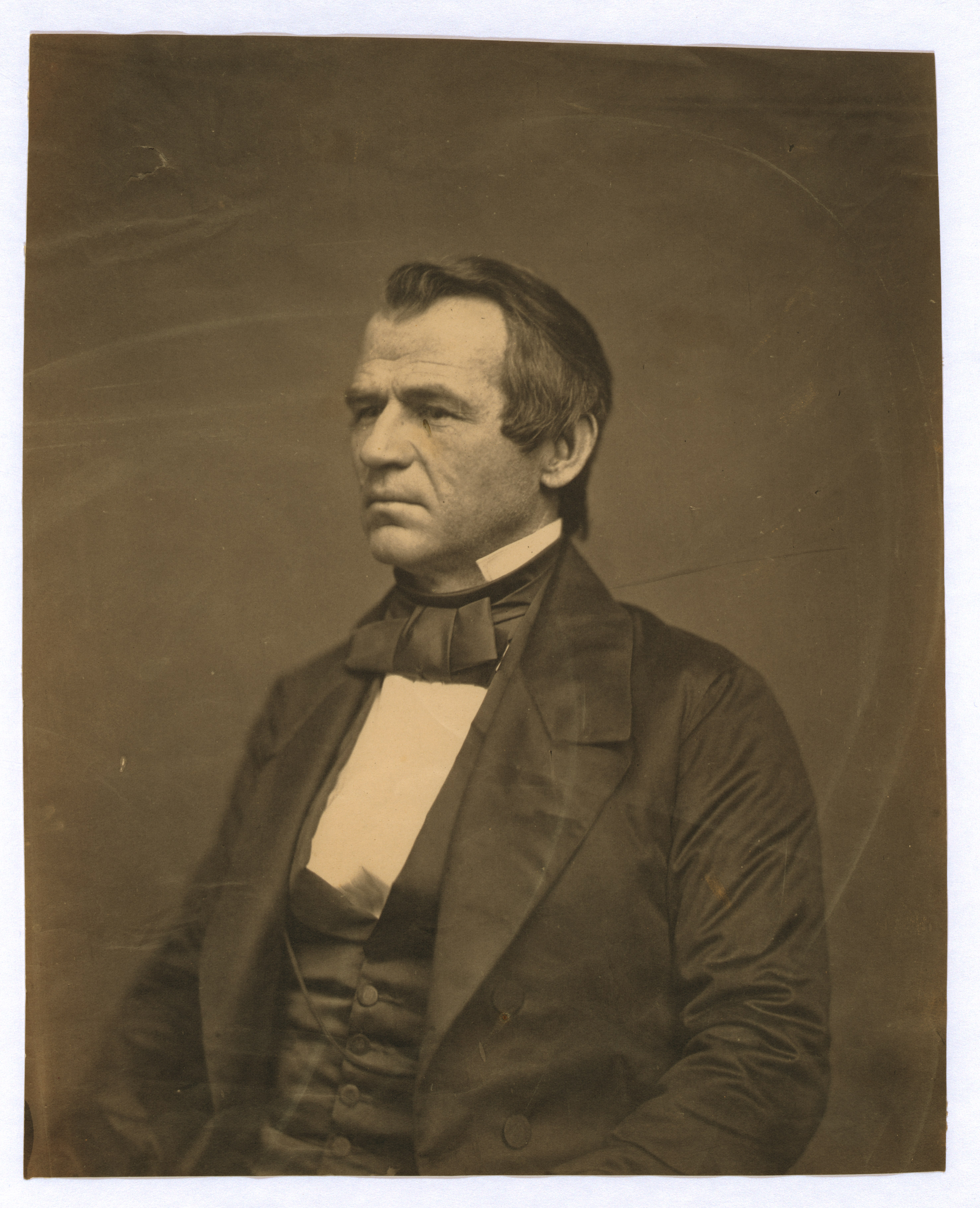
U.S. Senator Andrew Johnson c. 1860, photograph by Jesse Whitehurst (Library of Congress – 2004672615)

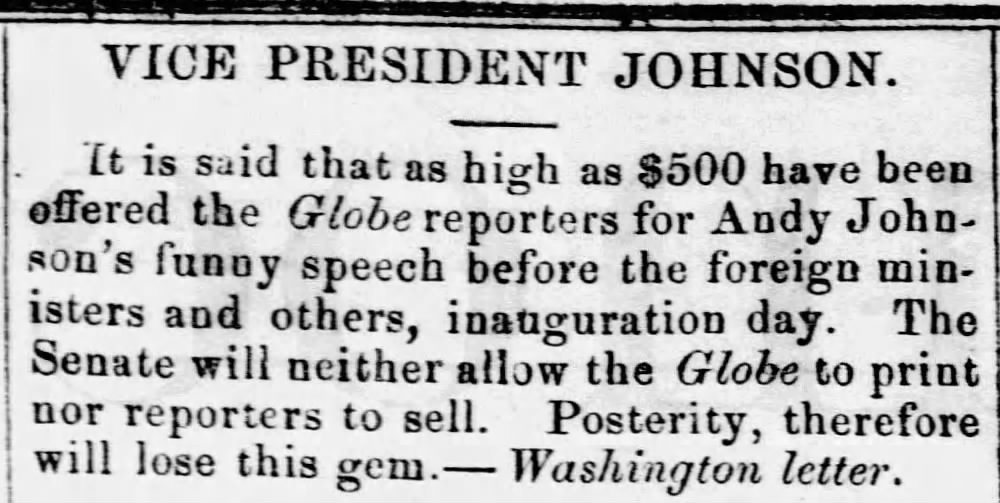
"Vice President Johnson" Monmouth Democrat, Freehold, New Jersey, March 30, 1865

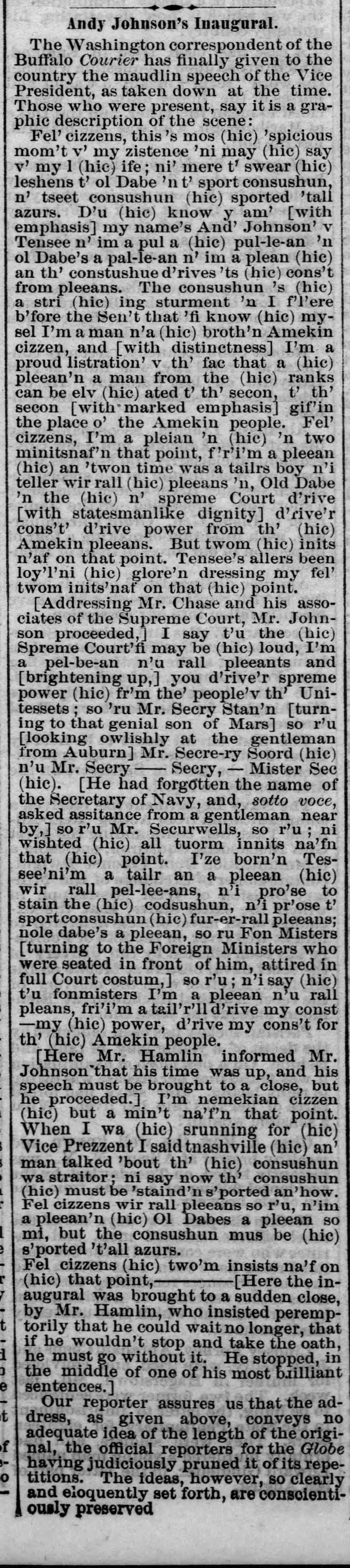
"Andy Johnson's Inaugural" Lancaster Intelligencer, March 29, 1865

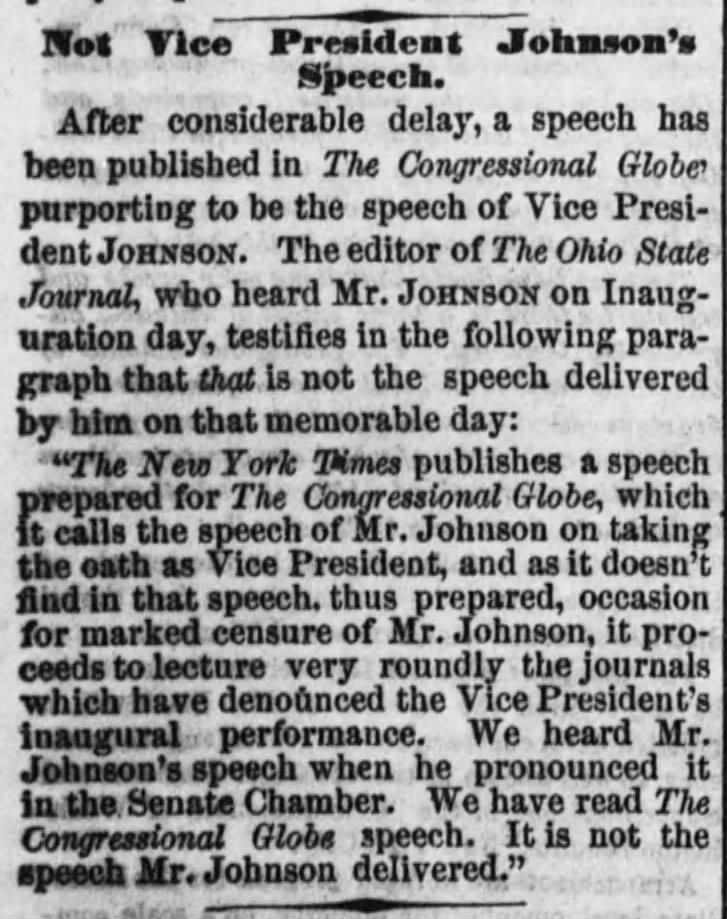
"Not Vice President Johnson's Speech" Daily Ohio Statesman, March 25, 1865

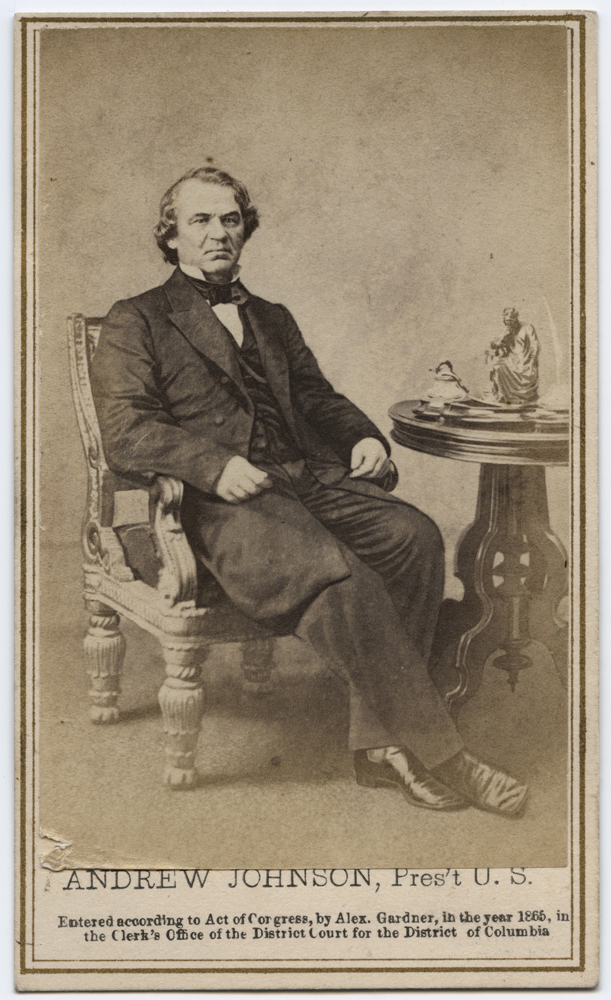
U.S. President Johnson in 1865, carte de visite by Alexander Gardner (SMU DeGolyer Library – Ag2005.0004)

The stumbling, stammering, and repetition mentioned by the Herald led one study of vice-presidential inaugurations to surmise that they were still using an early, longer version of the Vice Presidential oath of office on this occasion. Brooks thought Johnson's oath was "inaudible" but when he was done Johnson "turned and took the Bible in his hand, and, facing the audience, said, with a loud, theatrical voice and gesture, 'I kiss this Book in the face of my nation of the United States.'" Rev. Henry Ward Beecher was apparently present; "He saw the Bible whirled by the incoming V. P. about his head, like a cap when a man gives three cheers...The spectacle of an inebriated Vice President hiccoughing out his oath of office furnished such a text for discourse on temperance as hardly turns up once in an age." A Cincinnati paper reported that he had "driveled over the Holy Book as he took the oath of office," described the speech as "the idiotic babble of a mind besotted by a fortnight's debauch," demanded that Johnson resign, and editorialized "This cannot be covered up as a private infirmity [...] Mr. Johnson made a similar exhibition of himself here, and we then refrained on commenting on it because we thought it might only be a lapse in the interval when he was free from public duties."

== Lincoln ==
Lincoln arrived midway through Johnson's performance; he had been occupied with signing "last-minute bills" from the 38th Congress, which was to adjourn at noon. In one telling, "When Lincoln unobtrusively took his seat at the end of the clerk's desk, there was audible whispering from the ladies in the galleries, and there was much craning of necks while comment buzzed everywhere. Johnson spoke even more loudly in order to be heard, and then, as the noise died away, his voice was left stranded on a peak of sound." In 1871, Forney recalled the day of the inauguration in an essay:

I can never forget President Lincoln's face as he came into the Senate Chamber while Johnson was delivering his incoherent harangue [...] He took his seat facing the brilliant and surprised audience, and heard all that took place with unutterable sorrow.

Henderson, who was sitting beside Lincoln on the floor, reported "During the painful ordeal, Mr. Lincoln's head dropped in the deepest humiliation. As I offered him my arm for the procession to the steps of the Capitol where he delivered the inaugural, he turned to the marshal [Benjamin B. French] and said, 'Don't let Johnson speak outside.'" According to historian William C. Harris, Lincoln "disliked any intemperate or improper conduct in public" but with his usual instinctual political acumen, closing his eyes allowed Lincoln to "avoid the stares of those who sought his reaction."

== Transcript ==
There appears to be no verbatim transcript. In the retelling of historian Philip Van Doren Stern, "Only the newspaper accounts of the day give a truthful approximation of which he actually said. On March 9 Johnson wrote to Richard Sutton, chief reporter of the Senate, saying: 'I see from the Congressional Globe that the proceedings of Saturday, the 4 inst. have not yet been published, and as I understand there has been some criticism...will you...preserve the original notes...and bring me an accurate copy of your report of what I said on that occasion.' The speech, as published in the Globe on March 17, is obviously rewritten."

Multiple accounts had it that the reporters of the Congressional Globe, the official record of the proceedings of the United States Congress, were "tampered with" in order to prevent the release of an accurate record. Volume seven of The Papers of Andrew Johnson (published in 16 volumes by the University of Tennessee) offers two variant reports of the speech, a "sanitized" version from the Congressional Globe, and one from the New York Times, as well as a mention of a flattering rendition from Forney's newspaper, the Philadelphia Press, that "totally concealed the humiliating episode" and indicated that the audience responded with silence rather than applause when Johnson concluded his remarks. The Cleveland Daily Leader called out the "double-dealing" New York Times for reprinting the "expurgated and glossed over" wording in the Globe, writing, "It is notorious that the speech published in the Congressional Globe is not the speech which Mr. Johnson delivered. It is notorious that the real speech disgraced the speaker and insulted the audience, and covered the nation with shame. It is notorious that when that speech was delivered Mr. Johnson was in a state of gross intoxication."

According to the Andrew Johnson Biographical Companion, news reports of the content of the speech tended to itemize the topics as bullet points and/or claim that Johnson could not be heard due to ambient noise. The Baltimore Sun passed the buck, referring its readers to "the Senate's proceedings" should they care to know the content of the speech. The Weekly Progress of Raleigh, North Carolina, claimed that perhaps reporters found the speech incomprehensible because of "the want of order which prevailed among the women in the galleries." (The women had been talking with their human voices, and, furthermore, a South American diplomat had gotten "entangled with a mass of crinoline" and tripped and fallen down.)

The correspondent for the Buffalo Courier rendered Johnson's opening remarks as below. Italics have been added to the hiccups and editorial asides to further distinguish them from Johnson's verbiage. (Note: The Buffalo Courier rendition seems to suggest that Johnson repeatedly muttered something like "two and a half minutes on that point," which is interesting in light of the fact that the speech was scheduled to last seven minutes.)

Fel' cizzens, this 's mos (hic) 'spicious mom't v' my zistence 'ni may (hic) say v' my l (hic) ife; ni' mere t' swear (hic) leshens t' ol Dabe 'nt' sport consushun, n' tseet consushun (hic) sported 'tall azurs. D'u (hic) know y am' [with emphasis] my name's And' Johnson' v Tensee n' im a pul a (hic) pul-le-an 'n ol Dabe's a pal-le-an n' im a plean (hic) an th' constushue d'rives 'ts (hic) cons't from pleeans. The consushun 's (hic) a stri (hic) ing sturment 'n I f'l'ere b'fore the Sen't that 'fi know (hic) my-sel I'm a man n'a (hic) broth'n Amekin cizzen, and [with distinctness] I'm a proud listration' v th' fac that a (hic) pleean'n a man from the (hic) ranks can be elv (hic) ated t' th' secon, t' th' secon [with marked emphasis] gif'in the place o' the Amekin people. Fel' cizzens, I'm a pleian 'n (hic) 'n two minitsnaf'n that point, f'r'i'm a pleean (hic) an 'twon time was a tailrs boy n'i teller wir rail (hic) pleeans 'n, Old Dabe 'n the (hic) n' spreme Court d'rive [with statesmanlike dignity] d'rive'r cons't' d'rive power from th' (hic) Amekin pleeans. But twom (hic) inits'naf on that point. Tensee's allers been loy'l'ni (hic) glore'n dressing my fel' twom inits'naf on that (hic) point.

Another approximation comes from the Times of London, which described Johnson as behaving like an "illiterate, vulgar, and drunken rowdy," boasting of himself in "the language of a clown and with the manners of a costermonger," and consistently pronouncing you as yeooo:

I am 'a-going for to tell you here—to-day—yes, I am a-going for to tell you all that I am a plebeian. I glory in it, I am a plebeian. The people, yes, the people of the United States, the great people have made me what I am; and I am a-going for to tell you here to-day, yes, to-day, in this place that the people are everything. We owe all to them. If it not be too presumptuous, I will tell the foreign ministers a-sittin' there that I am one of the people. I will say to senators and others before me, I will say to the Supreme Court which sits before me, that you all get your power and place from the people.

== Reactions from observers ==
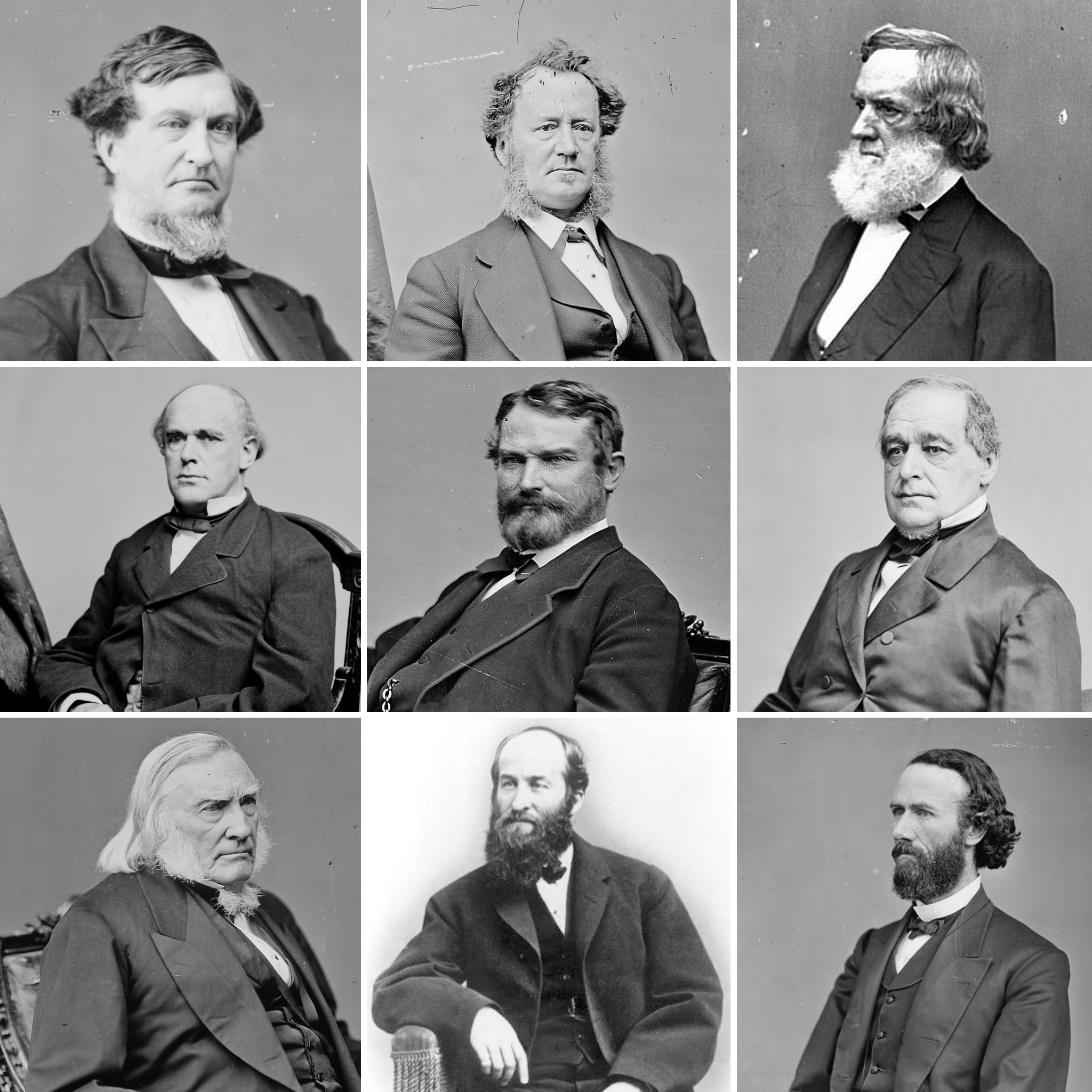
Top, L to R: U.S. Senator Zachariah Chandler (Michigan), Secretary of the Senate John W. Forney, Secretary of the Navy Gideon Welles Middle, L to R: Chief Justice Salmon P. Chase, U.S. Senator James R. Doolittle (Wisconsin), outgoing vice president Hannibal Hamlin Bottom, L to R: Justice Samuel Nelson, journalist Noah Brooks, U.S. Senator John B. Henderson (Missouri)

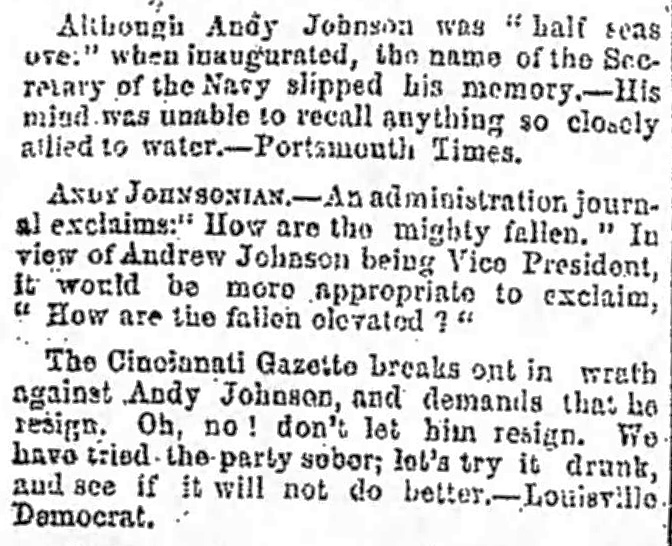
Newspaper commentary compiled a month after the inauguration (Syracuse Daily Courier and Union, April 8, 1865)

U.S. Senator Zachariah Chandler of Michigan wrote his wife, "I was never so mortified in my life. Had I been able to find a small hole, I should have dropped through it out of sight." Someone working in the Ordnance Department wrote in a private letter to his father that Johnson had been "disgracefully drunk." The Hartford Press correspondent refused to cover it out of shame, writing his editor Charles Dudley Warner, "The second official of the Nation—drunk—drunk—when about to take his oath of office, bellowing and ranting and shaking his fists at Judges, Cabinet and Diplomats, and making a fool of himself to such a degree that indignation is almost compelled to pity." Brooks watched the watchers, later reporting: "The speaker kept on, although President Lincoln sat before him, patiently waiting for his extraordinary harangue to be over. The study of the faces below was interesting. Seward was as bland and serene as a summer day; Stanton appeared to be petrified [...] Among the Union senators Henry Wilson's face was flushed; Sumner wore a saturnine and sarcastic smile; and most of the others turned and twisted in their senatorial chairs as if in long-drawn agony. Of the Supreme Bench, Judge Nelson only was apparently moved, his lower jaw being dropped clean down in blank horror. Chase was marble, adamant, granite in immobility until Johnson turned his back upon the Senate to take the oath, when he exchanged glances with Nelson, who then closed up his mouth."

Welles recorded in his diary:

The Vice-President elect made a rambling and strange harangue, which was listened to with pain and mortification by all his friends. My impressions were that he was under the influence of stimulants, yet I know not that he drinks. He has been sick and is feeble; perhaps he may have taken medicine, or stimulants, or his brain from sickness may have been overactive in these new responsibilities. Whatever the cause, it was all in very bad taste. The delivery of the inaugural address, the administering of the oath, and the whole deportment of the President were well done, and the retiring Vice-President appeared to advantage when contrasted with his successor, who has humiliated his friends. Speed, who sat at my left, whispered me that "all this is in wretched bad taste", and very soon he said, "The man is certainly deranged." I said to Stanton, who was on my right, "Johnson is either drunk or crazy." Stanton replied, "There is evidently something wrong." Seward says it was emotion on returning and revisiting the Senate; that he can appreciate Johnson's feelings, who was much overcome. I hope Seward is right, but don't entirely concur with him. There is, as Stanton says, something wrong. I hope it is sickness.

In the original journal, rather than the transcription edited and published by his son, Welles had written and then struck out the word ~~drunk~~, replacing "the short stark word" with the phrase under the influence of stimulants.

== Later that day ==
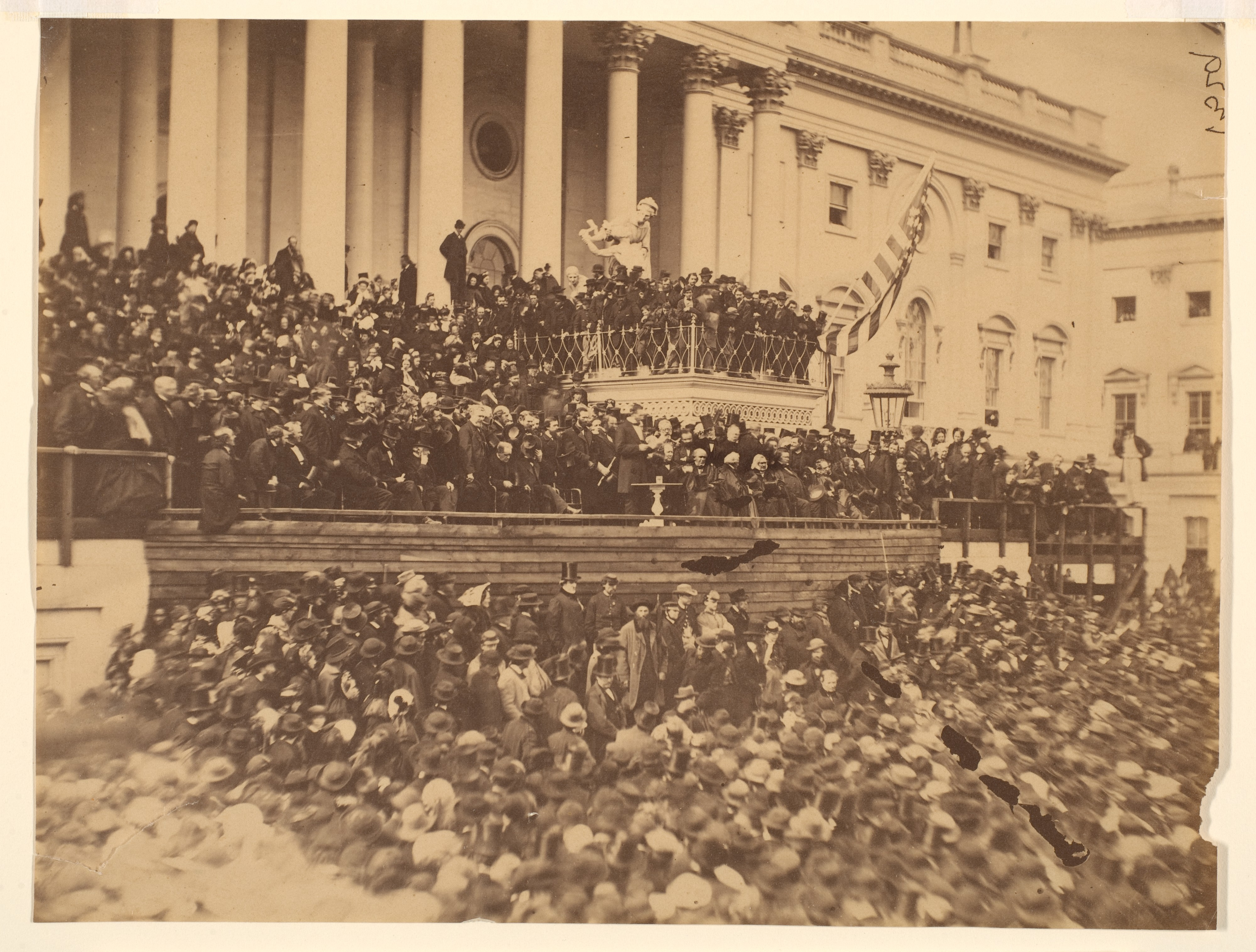
Alexander Gardner took this photo during Lincoln's second inaugural address; Johnson, sworn in earlier in the day, is the individual seated in the front row, who is holding his hat in front of his face; Hannibal Hamlin is seated immediately to the left of Johnson; Lincoln is at the lectern; John B. Henderson stands just behind Lincoln, listening intently with his hands clasped; the Supremes are seated in the front row to the right of Lincoln. (Gilman Collection, MET 2005.100.1215)

Per a Pennsylvania paper, after his own swearing-in, Johnson "had to be pushed through his rôle in a condition of maudlin bewilderment." Johnson was too disoriented to successfully administer the oath of office to incoming Senators, so Forney stepped in and did so. (Note: Johnson also did not return to the Senate on the afternoon of March 4 to preside over further business.) After Lincoln's speech (the now-totemic second inaugural address), which was made outdoors, on the East Portico, there were calls from the crowd for Johnson to make a speech (in the telling of the N.Y. Herald, "He rubbed his red face with his hands as if to clear up his ideas, but did not succeed and said nothing"). An encore was successfully avoided. In at least one Alexander Gardner photograph of the inauguration, Johnson is seated in the front row, holding his hat over his face. Lincoln took the opportunity to point out to Johnson the presence of Frederick Douglass, an experience Douglass described in his memoirs:

Mr. Lincoln touched Mr. Johnson, and pointed me out to him. The first expression which came to his face, and which I think was the true index of his heart, was one of bitter contempt and aversion. Seeing that I observed him, he tried to assume a more friendly appearance; but it was too late; it was useless to close the door when all within had been seen. His first glance was the frown of the man, the second was the bland and sickly smile of the demagogue. I turned to Mrs. Dorsey and said, "Whatever Andrew Johnson may be, he certainly is no friend of our race." No stronger contrast could well be presented between two men than between President Lincoln and Vice-President Johnson on this day. Mr. Lincoln was like one who was treading the hard and thorny path of duty and self-denial; Mr. Johnson was like one just from a drunken debauch. The face of the one was full of manly humility, although at the topmost height of power and pride, the other was full of pomp and swaggering vanity. The fact was, though it was yet early in the day, Mr. Johnson was drunk.

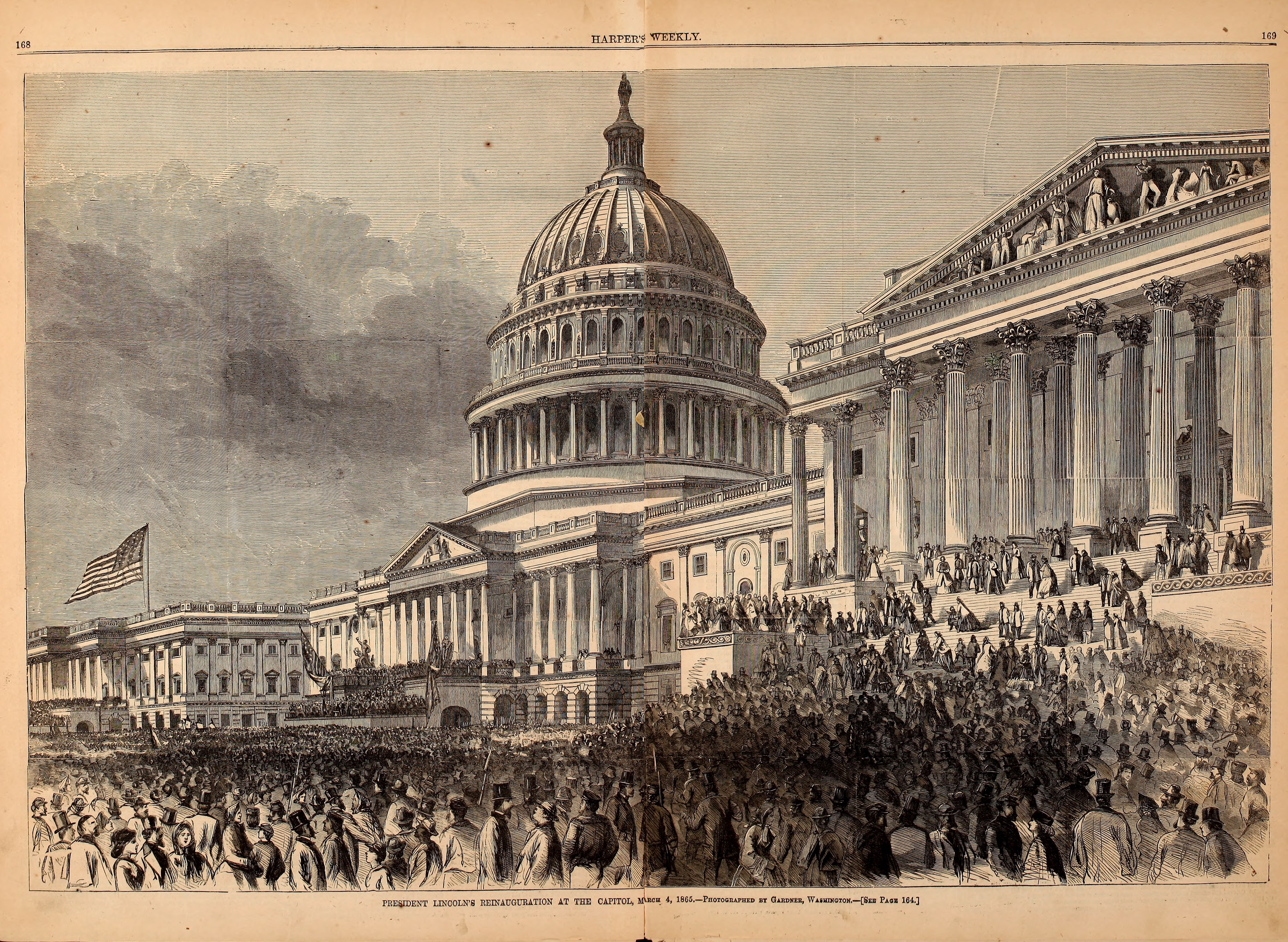
President Lincoln's inauguration at the U.S. Capitol, as photographed by Gardner and reprinted as a woodcut in Harper's Weekly

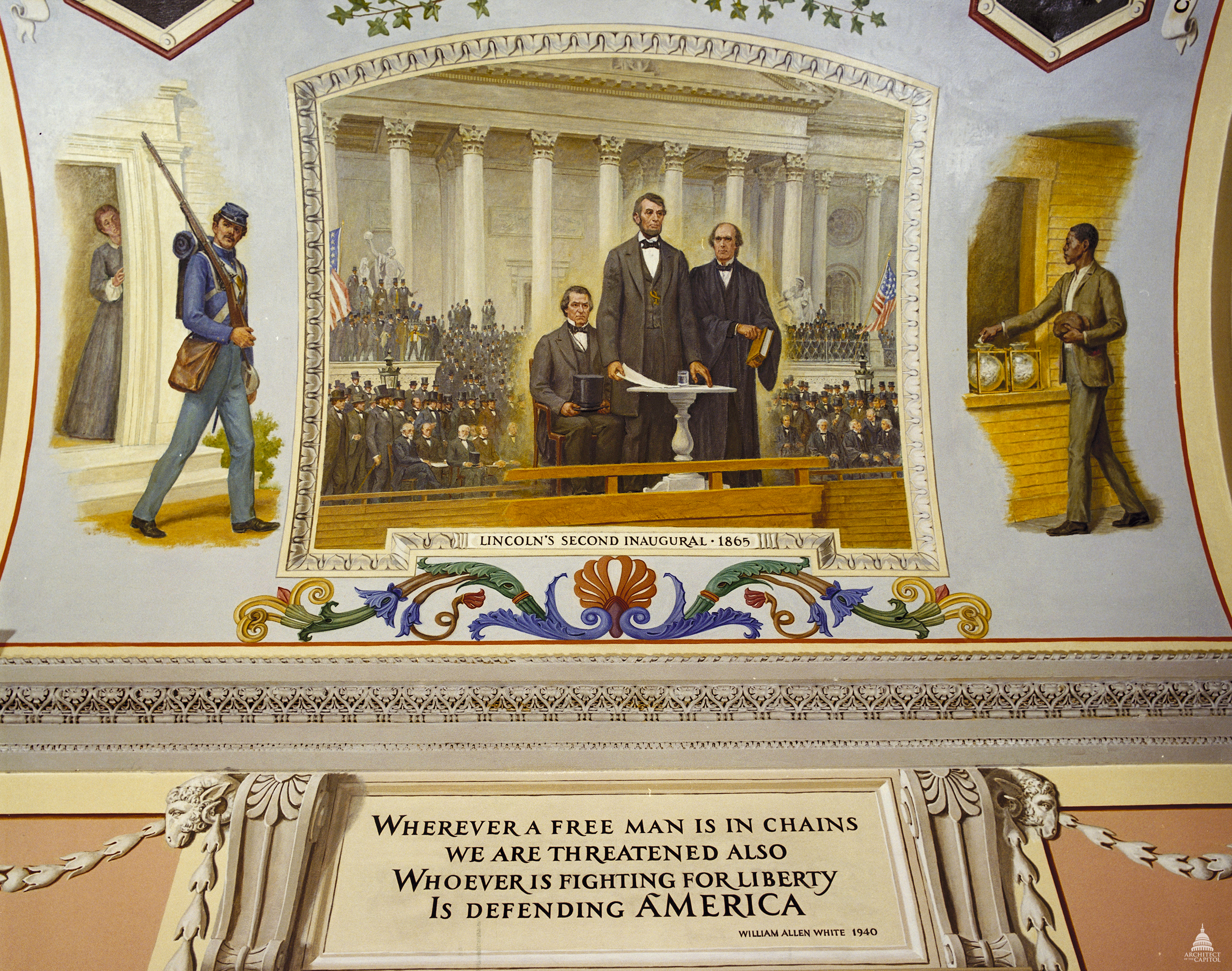
Artwork at the Capitol depicting Johnson and Chase present at Lincoln's swearing-in

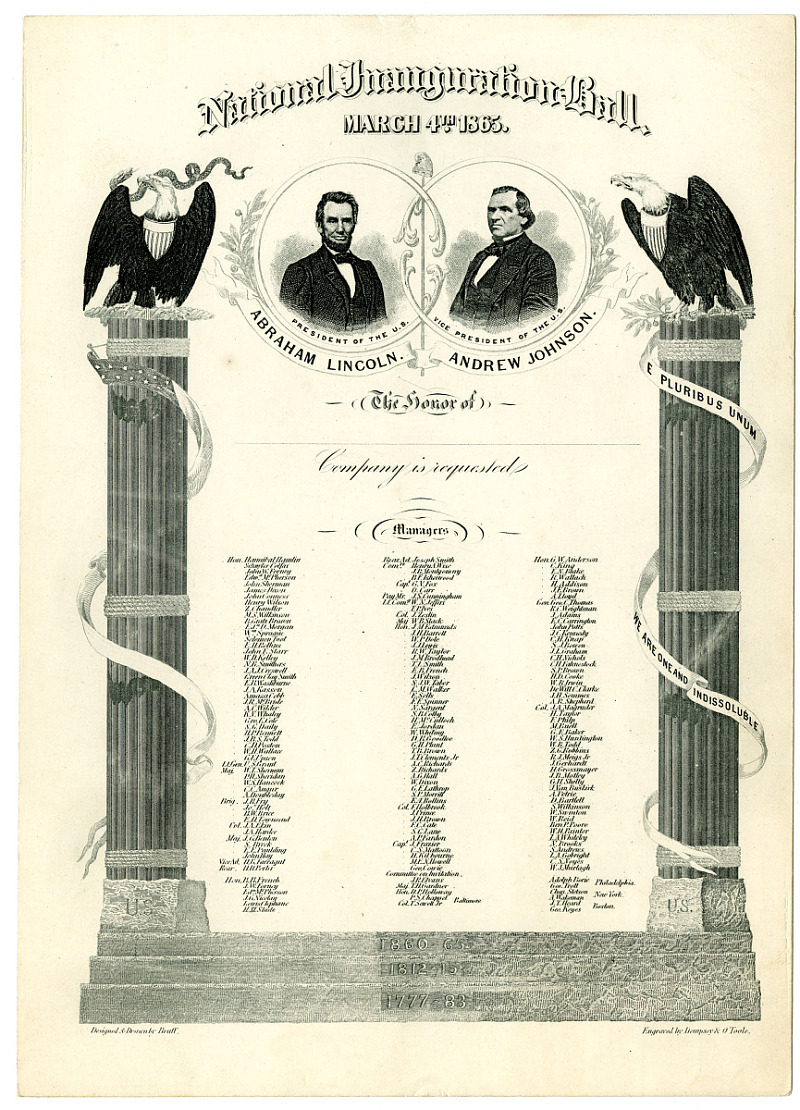
Invitation to the inaugural ball (Smithsonian –PL.227739.1865.R01)

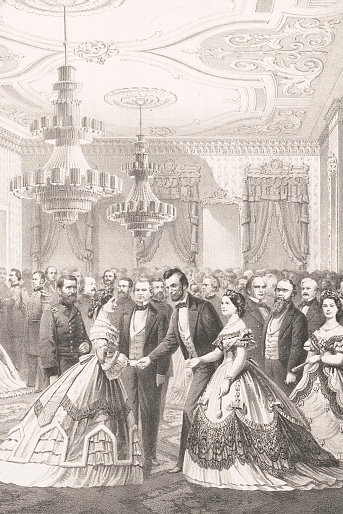
An artist's fanciful depiction of Lincoln administration dignitaries at the 1865 inaugural ball; Johnson looks on as Julia Grant greets Abraham Lincoln. (Library of Congress – pga.07429)

== Inaugural ball ==
Johnson attended the March 6 inaugural ball, which "after his rebuff in the Senate" earlier that day, "started tongues to wagging." There are two surviving newspaper mentions of Johnson at Lincoln's inaugural ball. The Democratic-aligned Democrat of Montrose, Pennsylvania, claimed that Johnson had to be carried out of the inaugural ball. The Springfield Republican of Massachusetts, a source described as "one of the leading Republican newspapers in the country," reported that Johnson was "so far stupefied with liquor" at the inaugural ball that he had to be physically carried back to his rooms.

== Press commentary ==
Following the inauguration there was a roiling debate about what, exactly, had happened, but "there was no disagreement as to the baneful effect his maudlin performance had on those in attendance. Reaction throughout the country was one of shock, dismay, and humiliation." The New York World read the entrails and saw augurs of doom: "And to think that only one frail human stands between this insolent clownish drunkard and the Presidency! May God bless and spare Abraham Lincoln! Should this Andrew Johnson become his successor, the decline and fall of the American republic would smell as rank in history as that of atrocious monsters in human shape as Nero and Caligula." Cincinnati journalist "Mack" (Joseph B. McCullagh) wrote, "... the subject is really too sickening to write about [...] All I have to say about the inauguration is, may He who controls the lives of men and the destinies of nations preserve the life of Abraham Lincoln, and spare the country the humiliation it would be made to feel in the contingency of Andrew Johnson's assumption of the reins of government." Several years later, Forney wrote a passage that is suggestive of the incident: "Lincoln, without seeming to aspire, reached the highest station in the world; while Johnson, always reaching forth for the golden fruit, got it, and lost it in a fit of inconceivable madness. Abraham Lincoln died at the best moment for himself; Andrew Johnson lives to prove how great opportunities may be wasted."

The newspapers, with their various political alignments, fell into partisan backbiting about the coverage or lack thereof, about which the New York Independent wrote, "Once or twice, we have felt it our duty to speak against the excessive use of intoxicating liquors by our public men. It may be asked: What is the duty of a public journal in such cases? It seems to us plain. We hold that if a public man is drunken in private company, he is not amendable to a comment in the newspapers, but if he be drunk while acting his part on a public occasion, his offence is against the public, and should never be shielded from the just punishment of public censure. In the Senate chamber on the 4th of March, in presence of the Senate, of the House, of the Cabinet, of the Supreme Court, of the diplomatic corps, of the newspaper press, of a gallery of ladies, and (during part of the time) of the President of the United States—and on an occasion to be forever historic—the Vice President elect presented himself to take his solemn oath of office in state of intoxication. Not in anger, but in sorrow, do we chronicle this fact, which we have no right to suppress." Similarly, Maine's Bangor Jeffersonian editorialized, "What is the object of having a party respectable and honest if such public obliquities of conduct are to be whitewashed?" The Troy Daily Whig of upstate New York took the opportunity to engage in some gossipy whataboutism, listing John Bell, John C. Breckinridge, Stephen A. Douglas, Franklin Pierce, John Tyler, Daniel Webster, and Silas Wright as U.S. government leaders who had been known to overindulge (in some cases chronically), ergo public drunkenness on a state occasion was not automatically disqualifying, although Johnson's friends should surely give him a stern talking-to.

The spectacle inspired a song performed at Grover's Theater on E Street:

And there Great Andy Johnson got
And took a brandy-toddy hot,
Which made him drunk as any sot,
At the Inauguration.

And now to wipe out the disgrace,
The President has closed the place,
Where Andy Johnson fell from grace,—
At the Inauguration!

Both before and after Lincoln's murder, people speculated, without evidence, that maybe Johnson had not been inebriated but had in fact been poisoned as part of a larger conspiracy to destroy the federal government.

== Political impact ==
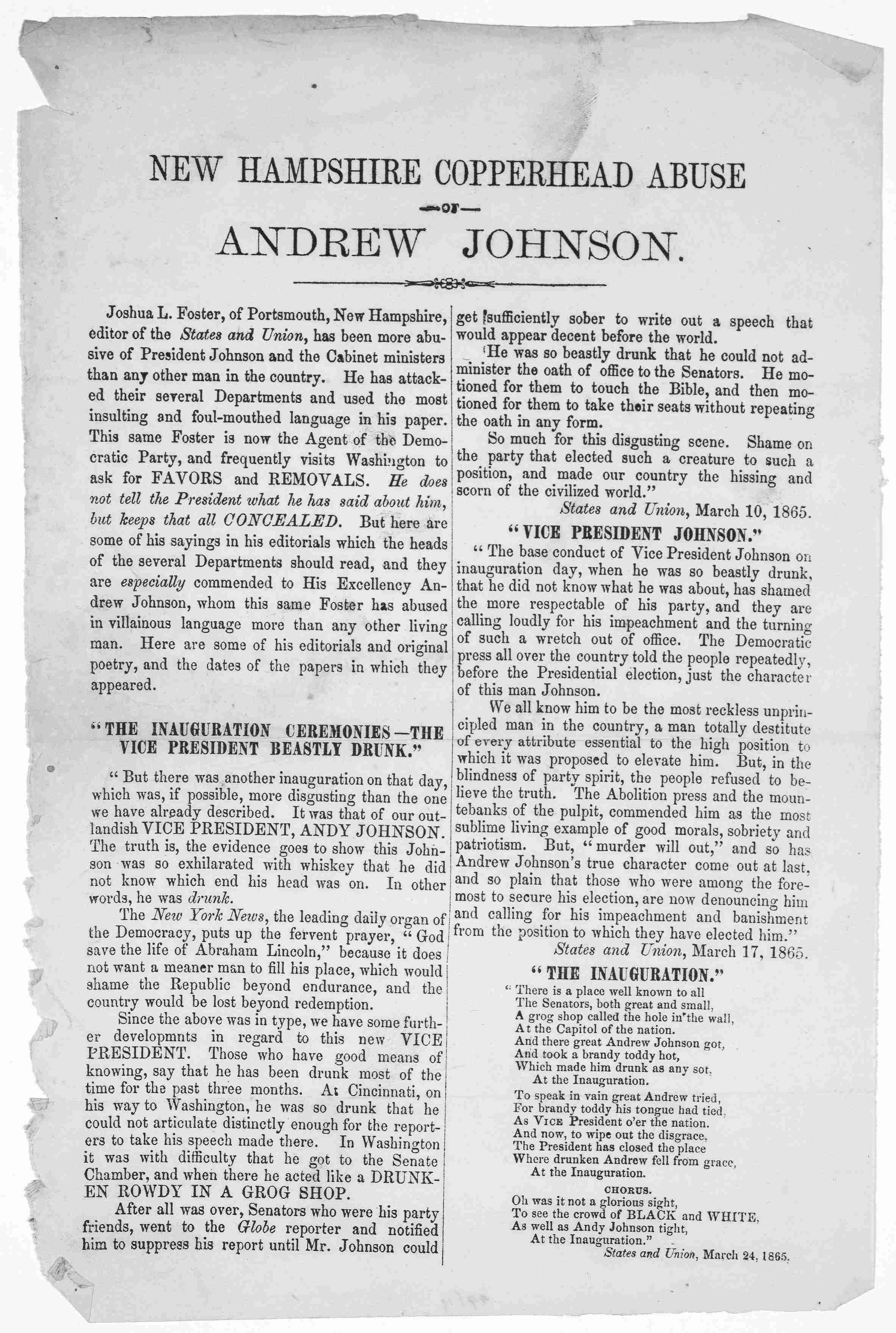
New Hampshire Copperhead Abuse of Andrew Johnson broadside printed 1865; the "hole in the wall" mentioned in the song lyrics was an actual barroom just off the Senate floor. (Library of Congress – 2020778138)

The Times (London) commented that any other man would have been arrested by the sergeant at arms "for drunkenness in the Senate chamber." Johnson was not arrested, nor was he discharged from his position of responsibility. Amidst the crisis, according to Forney, "No voice of anger was heard from Abraham Lincoln. While nearly all censured and many threatened, Mr. Lincoln simply said, 'It has been a severe lesson for Andy, but I do not think he will do it again.'" Even if President Lincoln had wanted to "fire" Vice President Johnson, he would not have had constitutional standing to do so. Lincoln told his Treasury Secretary Hugh McCulloch, who had expressed concern about Johnson's public intoxication, not to worry about it: "I have known Andy Johnson for many years; he made a bad slip the other day, but you need not be scared; Andy ain't a drunkard." Historian Louis Clinton Hatch wrote, "This is a surprising statement. Lincoln could have had little or no personal acquaintance with Johnson, though he had met him during the campaign. Probably McCulloch, who retired from the Cabinet after his breach with the Republicans, unconsciously did Johnson the favor of strengthening his statement." Gordon-Reed comments that McCulloch's account of Lincoln's comment "is often presented as if it settled the matter. Lincoln was the great lawyer and leader that he was because he possessed that ineffable but critical skill necessary in both positions: the ability to project calm and allay fears—to be able to look into the eyes of a frightened client, guilty or not, and say that everything is going to be all right, or to convince a fearful population that the nation would emerge victorious from its time of trouble. What else could the great man have said to McCulloch? Yes, Hugh, I agree—we're all doomed, now. Abandon ship! If something happens to me, the United States will be left in the hands of a drunkard."

Per Welles, Johnson's "infirmity" was discussed at the cabinet meeting immediately following ("no one appears to have been aware of any failing"), and per Henderson, "The scene was so deeply humiliating that a caucus of senators a few days afterward seriously considered the propriety of asking him to resign as their presiding officer." As a direct consequence of the speech fiasco, the U.S. Senate did vote to drop James A. McDougall of California and Willard Saulsbury Sr. of Delaware "from all its standing committees 'because of their habitual inebriety and incapacity for business.'"

== Johnson's vice presidency and presidency ==
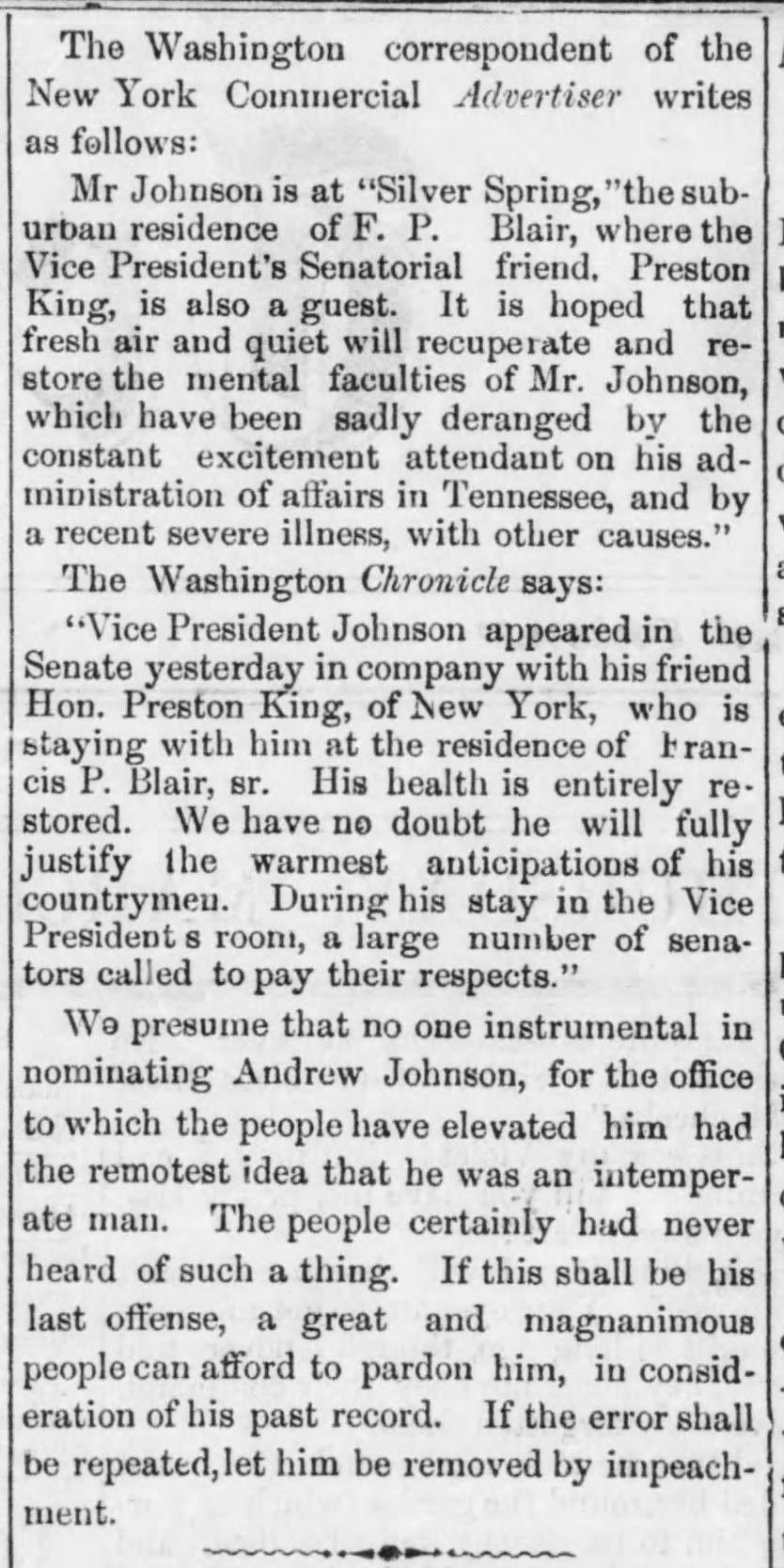
"Washington correspondence" indicating that Johnson was sheltering with his Blair-family allies (Kenosha Telegraph-Courier, Kenosha, Wisconsin, March 23, 1865)

After the fact, Johnson "hid from the press" at the Silver Spring estate of the Blair family in Maryland. According to historian Hatch, "The Senate Journal shows that he presided at the session of Monday, March 6, and the correspondent of the New-York Tribune wrote his paper that the Vice-President attended the inauguration ball that evening and was especially attentive to Mrs. Lincoln; but, on March 7, Mr. Johnson was absent from the Senate and remained so throughout the session. It is probable that he went to Silver Spring on that day, and it is certain that he stayed there about a fortnight until after the Senate had adjourned, after the excitement over his inauguration had died down, and his health had improved." (Note: According to Hatch, records show that if Johnson was indeed presiding on March 6, he oversaw Henry Wilson's motion to "forthwith to remove all liquor from the Senate wing of the Capitol". This resolution, which passed, was intended as a "deliberate insult to the Senate's new leader," and resulted in the closure of the Hole in the Wall bar, and "the sign over it which read EXCLUSIVELY FOR SENATORS was turned to the wall.") From Maryland, Johnson wrote letters explaining that had been "prostrated" by typhoid. Johnson made no public appearances until April 3, when he made an impromptu speech in front of a Pennsylvania Avenue hotel about the fall of the Confederate capital. According to the memoirs of James G. Blaine, Johnson was back in Washington again about April 9, 1865, and "when Mr. Johnson arrived from Fortress Monroe on the morning of April 10, and found the National Capital in a blaze of patriotic excitement over the surrender of Lee's army the day before at Appomattox, he hastened to the White House, and addressed to the unwilling ears of Mr. Lincoln an earnest protest against the indulgent terms conceded by General Grant." In 1866, a Tennessee newspaper account had it that Lincoln met with Johnson on April 11, 1865, forgoing a family carriage ride to take the meeting, and when he returned, "remarked with much apparent concern 'That miserable man! I cannot anticipate the trouble he will cause me during my second term of office.'" According to the standard account, Johnson and Lincoln supposedly did not meet again until the afternoon of April 14. That night John Wilkes Booth shot Lincoln in back of the head; the 16th president died at 7:22 a.m. the following day. Johnson's 42-day term would be the second-shortest vice-presidency in American history.

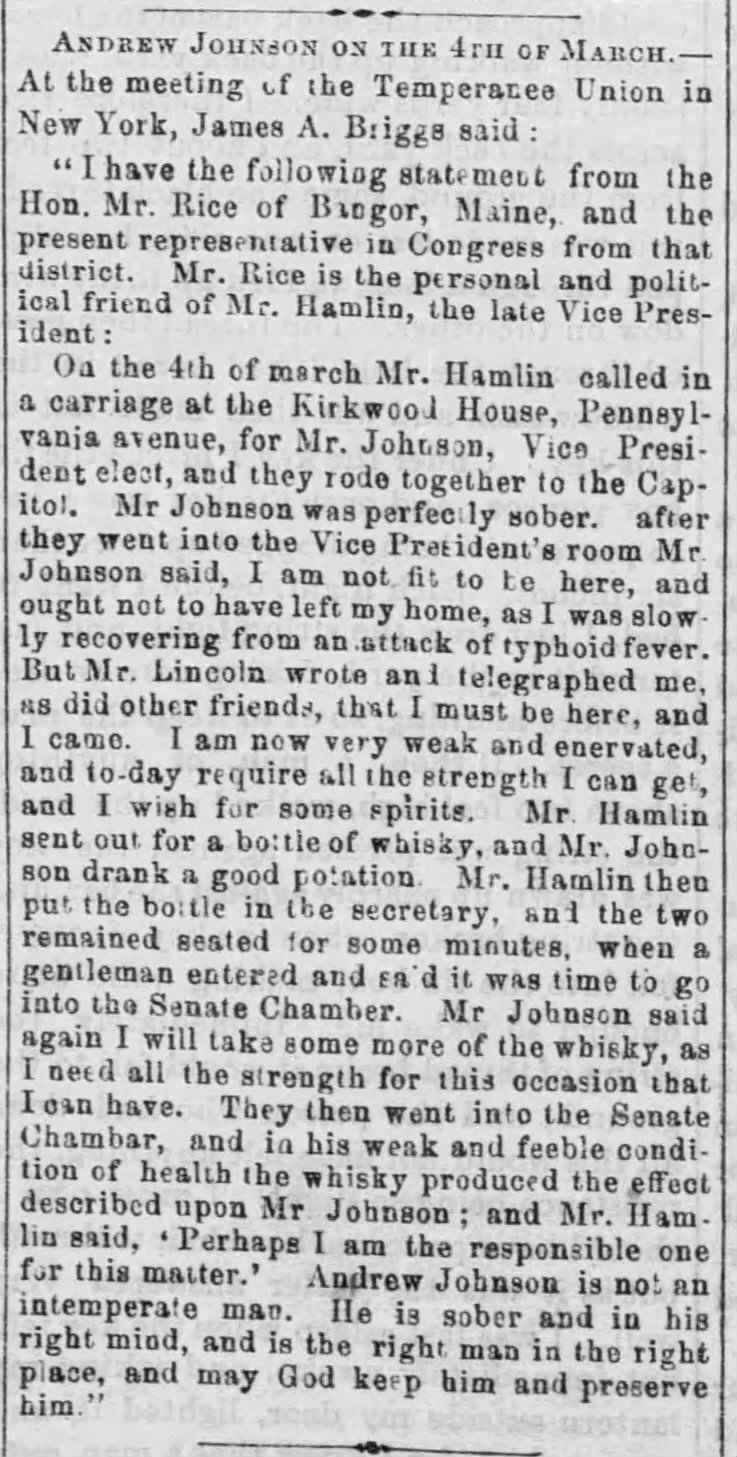
A month after Lincoln's assassination, a New York temperance man said that Congressman Rice said that Hamlin said that President Johnson was "sober and in his right mind" and "Perhaps I am the responsible one for this matter". ("Andrew Johnson on the 4th of March" The Lancaster Examiner, May 24, 1865)

In the end, whether or not he exhibited clinically significant symptoms of alcoholism, after the March 4 spectacle at the U.S. Capitol, "it did not much matter what the truth was about his drinking habits. The truth that mattered was that he had set himself up, made himself vulnerable to charges of drunkenness at virtually every crisis that beset his late political career." In the wars of Reconstruction that came after, "Senator Ben Wade and other Radicals repeatedly used the incident to portray Johnson as a drunkard." Indeed, as the Congress moved toward impeachment, Thaddeus Stevens commented, "I don't want to hurt the man's feelings by telling him he is a rascal. I'd rather put it mildly, and say he hasn't got off that inaugural drunk yet, and just let him retire to get sobered."

== View of historians ==
According to two Congressional Research Service staffers, Johnson's speech is "unfortunately, the most remembered inaugural address by a Vice President." According to the authors of what stood in the 20th century as the "basic work" on the Vice Presidency, vice-presidential inaugural addresses have "been uniformly grave and dignified with the exceptions of those of 1865 and 1917," and only two of all vice-presidential addresses to the Senate are considered "preeminent by the impression they made." The first preeminent speech was Aaron Burr's 1805 farewell address: Senators wept. The 1917 inaugural address by Thomas R. Marshall included some self-deprecating humor. Johnson's inaugural address of 1865, made while he was visibly and verifiably intoxicated, inspired universal "horror and disgust." Excuses were later made that Johnson's obvious intoxication was the result of medication for typhoid, or that Hamlin manipulated him into drinking to excess.

These formulations ignore a salient fact: Andrew Johnson was a grown man and responsible for his actions. If he was seriously ill before one of the most important events in American political life—at perhaps the most critical juncture in the nation's history—he should have taken better care of himself, and known that drinking multiple tumblers of whiskey was not a good idea. If he was the kind of person whom another man could ply with drinks against his will before he participated in what was, until then, the crowning achievement of his career, he was even less qualified to be president than he showed himself to be.

— Annette Gordon-Reed (2011)

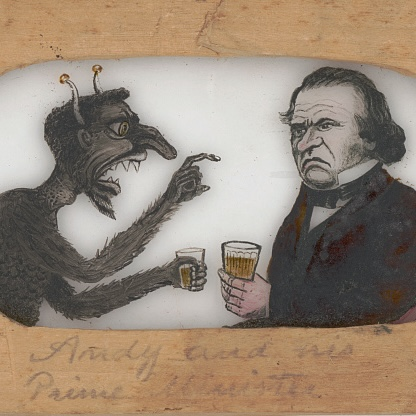
Hand-painted lantern slide of U.S. president Andrew Johnson drinking with the devil: The Andrew Johnson alcoholism debate, now primarily a topic for historians, was a key factor in public perception of his presidency. (Liljenquist Collection, Library of Congress – 2019646718)

According to political scientist Gautam Mukunda: "[Johnson's] combination of weakness, rigidity, and racism was exceptional even by 19th-century standards. The South was able to successfully win the peace after losing the war because Johnson inspired recalcitrant southerners to keep up the fight longer than a war-weary North was willing to maintain the pressure [...] Johnson's selection as vice president in 1864 was Lincoln's greatest mistake. Given the scale of Johnson's damage, Lincoln's assassination may be the greatest tragedy in American history."

== See also ==
- Inauguration of Andrew Johnson
- Bibliography of Andrew Johnson
- List of vice presidents of the United States
- Vice President of the United States § Constitutional roles
- Historical rankings of presidents of the United States
- Third Party System – Phase of U.S. party politics, c. 1854–1896
- Outline of whisky

== Sources ==
=== Books ===
- Achorn, Edward (2020). "Chapter 11: 'Andy Ain't a Drunkard' Saturday, noon, March 4, 1865". Every Drop of Blood: The Momentous Second Inauguration of Abraham Lincoln. Grove Atlantic. ISBN 9780802148766. LCCN 2019045236. OCLC 1164845279.
- Blaine, James G. (1886). "Chapter I". Twenty Years of Congress: from Lincoln to Garfield. Vol. II. Norwich, Connecticut: Henry Bill Pub. Co. LCCN 02019439. OCLC 894670836. OL 7166157M.
- Brabson, Fay W. (1972). Andrew Johnson: A Life in Pursuit of the Right Course, 1808–1875. Durham, North Carolina: Seeman Printery. LCCN 77151079. OCLC 590545. OL 4578789M.
- Browne, Stephen H. (2008). "Andrew Johnson and the Politics of Character". In Medhurst, Martin J. (ed.). Before the Rhetorical Presidency. Presidential Rhetoric and Political Communication No. 19. College Station, Texas: Texas A&M University Press. pp. 194–212. ISBN 978-1-60344-626-6. LCCN 2008011037. OCLC 726828935. Project MUSE book 2701.
- Cohen, Jared (2019). Accidental Presidents: Eight Men Who Changed America. New York: Simon & Schuster. ISBN 978-1-5011-0984-3. LCCN 2018043445. OCLC 1054267847.
- Douglass, Frederick (1881). Life and Times of Frederick Douglass. Hartford, Connecticut: Park Publishing Co. hdl:2027/uiuo.ark:/13960/t0dv8981z. LCCN 14003399. OCLC 3325537. OL 24644977M.
- Forney, John W. (1873). "XXIV (September 3, 1871)". Anecdotes of Public Men. Vol. I. New York: Harper & Brothers. pp. 165–177. LCCN 03027372. OCLC 613194445.
- Gordon-Reed, Annette (2011). Andrew Johnson. The American Presidents Series. New York: Times Books/Henry Holt. ISBN 978-0-8050-6948-8. LCCN 2010032595. OCLC 154806758.
- Hamlin, Charles E. (1899). The Life and Times of Hannibal Hamlin. Cambridge, Massachusetts: Riverside Press. LCCN 99001844. OCLC 559986758. OL 528831M.
- Harris, William C. (2009) [2004]. Lincoln's Last Months. Cambridge, Massachusetts: Belknap Press of Harvard University Press. doi:10.4159/9780674038363. ISBN 978-0-674-03836-3. LCCN 2003057907. OCLC 649790732. S2CID 152948464.
- Maslowski, Peter (1978). Treason Must Be Made Odious: Military Occupation and Wartime Reconstruction in Nashville, Tennessee, 1862–65. Millwood, New York: KTO Press. ISBN 978-0-527-62185-8. LCCN 78016799. OCLC 4004346.
- Means, Howard B. (2006). The Avenger Takes His Place: Andrew Johnson and the 45 Days That Changed the Nation. Harcourt, Inc. ISBN 9780151012121. LCCN 2006011374. OCLC 67239881.
- Milton, George Fort Jr. (1930). "Chapter VIII: Andy Makes a Bad Slip". The Age of Hate: Andrew Johnson and the Radicals. New York: Coward-McCann, Inc. LCCN 30031349. OCLC 739916.
- Mukunda, Gautam (2022). Picking Presidents: How to Make the Most Consequential Decision in the World. Berkeley: University of California Press. doi:10.1525/9780520977037. ISBN 9780520977037. JSTOR j.ctv2vr8tw4. LCCN 2021060597. OCLC 1303569935. S2CID 252420069.
- Nowlan, Robert A. (2016). The American Presidents From Polk to Hayes: What They Did, What They Said & What Was Said About Them. Denver: Outskirts Press. ISBN 9781478765721. LCCN 2015917085. OCLC 949382331.
- Schroeder-Lein, Glenna R.; Zuczek, Richard (2001). Andrew Johnson: A Biographical Companion. Santa Barbara, California: ABC-CLIO. ISBN 978-1-57607-030-7. LCCN 2001001777. OCLC 50174681. OL 3937770M.
- Scroggins, Mark (1994). Hannibal: The Life of Abraham Lincoln's First Vice President. Lanham, Maryland: University Press of America. ISBN 978-0-8191-9440-4. LCCN 93045957. OCLC 29564237.
- Trefousse, Hans L. (1989). Andrew Johnson: A Biography. New York: W. W. Norton & Co. ISBN 0-393-31742-0. LCCN 88028295. OCLC 463084977.
- Various (1986). Graf, LeRoy P. (ed.). The Papers of Andrew Johnson. Vol. 7, 1864–1865. Associate editors Patricia P. Clark and Marion O. Smith. Knoxville, Tennessee: University of Tennessee Press. ISBN 978-0-87049-098-9. LCCN 67025733. OCLC 489663229.
- Welles, Gideon (1911). "Chapter XXVIII". In Welles, Edgar T. (ed.). Diary of Gideon Welles, Secretary of the Navy Under Lincoln and Johnson. Vol. II (April 1, 1864–December 31, 1866). Boston: Houghton Mifflin Co. LCCN 38034416. OCLC 795127753. OL 6379113M.

=== Journal articles ===
- Hatch, Louis Clinton; Shoup, Earl L. (April 1934). "The Vice-Presidency of the United States". Americana. XXVIII (2). Somerville, N.J., and New York: American Historical Society, Inc.: 191–249. LCCN sf88092249. OCLC 1480991.
- Stathis, Stephen W.; Moe, Ronald C. (October 1980). "America's Other Inauguration". Presidential Studies Quarterly. Inaugurating the President and the Vice President Issue. 10 (4). New York: Center for the Study of the Presidency and Congress: 550–570. doi:10.1111/1741-5705.00026. eISSN 1741-5705. ISSN 0360-4918. JSTOR 27547623. LCCN 75646123. OCLC 45848856.

=== Magazine articles ===
- Brooks, Noah (April 1895). "Lincoln's Re-election: The Beginning of Lincoln's Second Term – The President's Shrewdness at Hampton Roads – Lincoln's Second Inauguration". The Century Illustrated Monthly Magazine. Vol. XLIX (49), no. 6. Union Square, New York: The Century Co. pp. 865–872. hdl:2027/uc1.32106011160956. ISSN 2837-5637.
- Henderson, John B. (December 1912). "Emancipation and Impeachment". The Century's After-the-War Series. Century Illustrated Monthly Magazine. Vol. LXXXV (85), no. 2. Union Square, New York: The Century Co. pp. 196–209. ISSN 2837-5637.
- Moore, John Trotwood (March 30, 1929). "Andrew Johnson—The Rail-Splitter's Running Mate". Saturday Evening Post. Vol. 201, no. 39. pp. 24–25, 162, 165, 166, 169. ISSN 0048-9239.
- Truman, Benjamin C. (January 1913). "Anecdotes of Andrew Johnson". The Century's After-the-War Series. The Century Illustrated Monthly Magazine. Vol. LXXXV (85), no. 3. Union Square, New York: The Century Co. pp. 435–440. ISSN 2837-5637.
- Van Doren Stern, Philip (February 1958). Catton, Bruce (ed.). "Lincoln's Second Inauguration: 'The President came forward and the sun burst through the clouds'". American Heritage. Vol. IX, no. 2. pp. 10–15, 94–97. ISSN 0002-8738. OCLC 1479963.

=== Historical context ===
- Bailey, Fred Arthur (Spring 1999). "John Trotwood Moore and the Patrician Cult of the New South". Tennessee Historical Quarterly. 58 (1): 16–33. ISSN 0040-3261. JSTOR 42627447.
- Barber, James D. (1968). "Adult Identity and Presidential Style: The Rhetorical Emphasis". Daedalus. 97 (3). American Academy of Arts & Sciences. MIT Press: 938–968. ISSN 0011-5266. JSTOR 20023846.
- Durham, G. Homer (September 1948). "The Vice-Presidency". The Western Political Quarterly. 1 (3): 311–315. doi:10.2307/442286. ISSN 1065-9129. JSTOR 442286.
- Dudley, Harold M. (March 1932). "The Election of 1864". The Mississippi Valley Historical Review. 18 (4): 500–518. doi:10.2307/1898560. ISSN 0161-391X. JSTOR 1898560.
- Gaston, Kay Baker (Spring 1984). "Robertson County Distilleries, 1796–1909". Tennessee Historical Quarterly. 43 (1): 49–67. ISSN 0040-3261. JSTOR 42626422.
- Lawing, Hugh A. (June 1961). "Andrew Johnson National Monument". Tennessee Historical Quarterly. 20 (2): 103–119. ISSN 0040-3261. JSTOR 42621527.
- Lincoln, Waldo (1923). "aadaf d. Mordecai Lincoln (1788–1851)". History of the Lincoln Family: An Account of the Descendants of Samuel Lincoln, of Hingham, Massachusetts, 1637–1920. Worcester, Mass.: Commonwealth Press. LCCN 23010111. OCLC 608728894. OL 6655304M.
- Rable, George C. (Winter 1973). "Anatomy of a Unionist: Andrew Johnson in the Secession Crisis". Tennessee Historical Quarterly. 32 (4): 332–354. ISSN 0040-3261. JSTOR 42623407.
