= Eutaw =

Eutaw may refer to:

- Eutaw, Alabama, a town, United States
  - Eutaw massacre, a racially motivated massacre in that town
- Eutaw, Mississippi, a ghost town, United States
- Eutaw Street, a major street in Baltimore, Maryland
  - Eutaw House, hotel on Eutaw Street in Baltimore, Maryland
- Eutaw Formation, a geological formation in the U.S. states of Alabama, Georgia, and Mississippi
- USS Eutaw (1863), a Union Navy steam gunboat of the American Civil War
- Eutaw, an album by Old Crow Medicine Show
- A section of Fayetteville, North Carolina, just off of Bragg Boulevard

== See also ==
- Battle of Eutaw Springs, part of the American Revolutionary War
