= Abraham Lincoln's second inaugural address =

1865 speech by the U.S. President

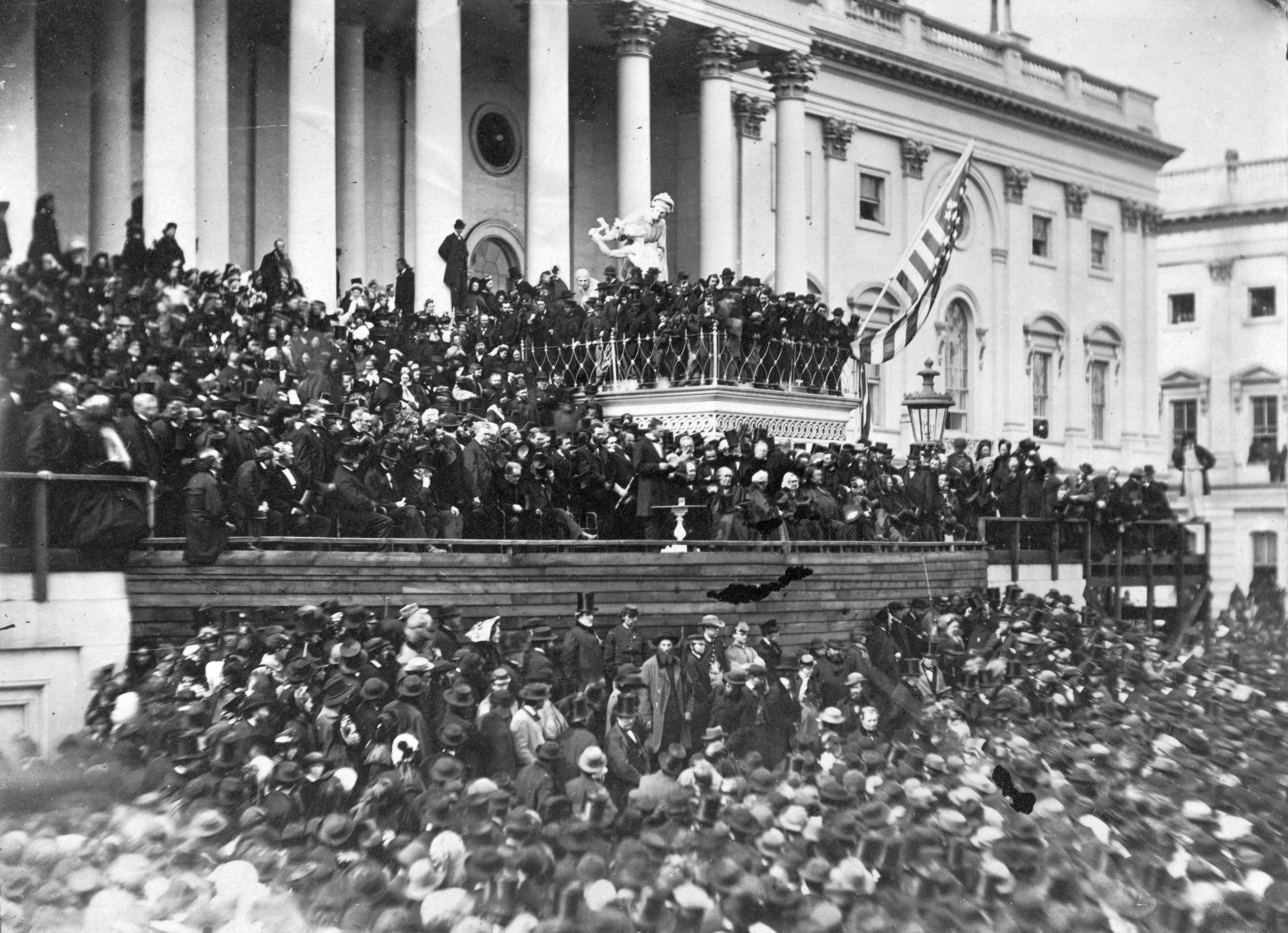
This image of Lincoln delivering his second inaugural address is the most famous photograph of the event. Lincoln stands in the center, with papers in his hand.

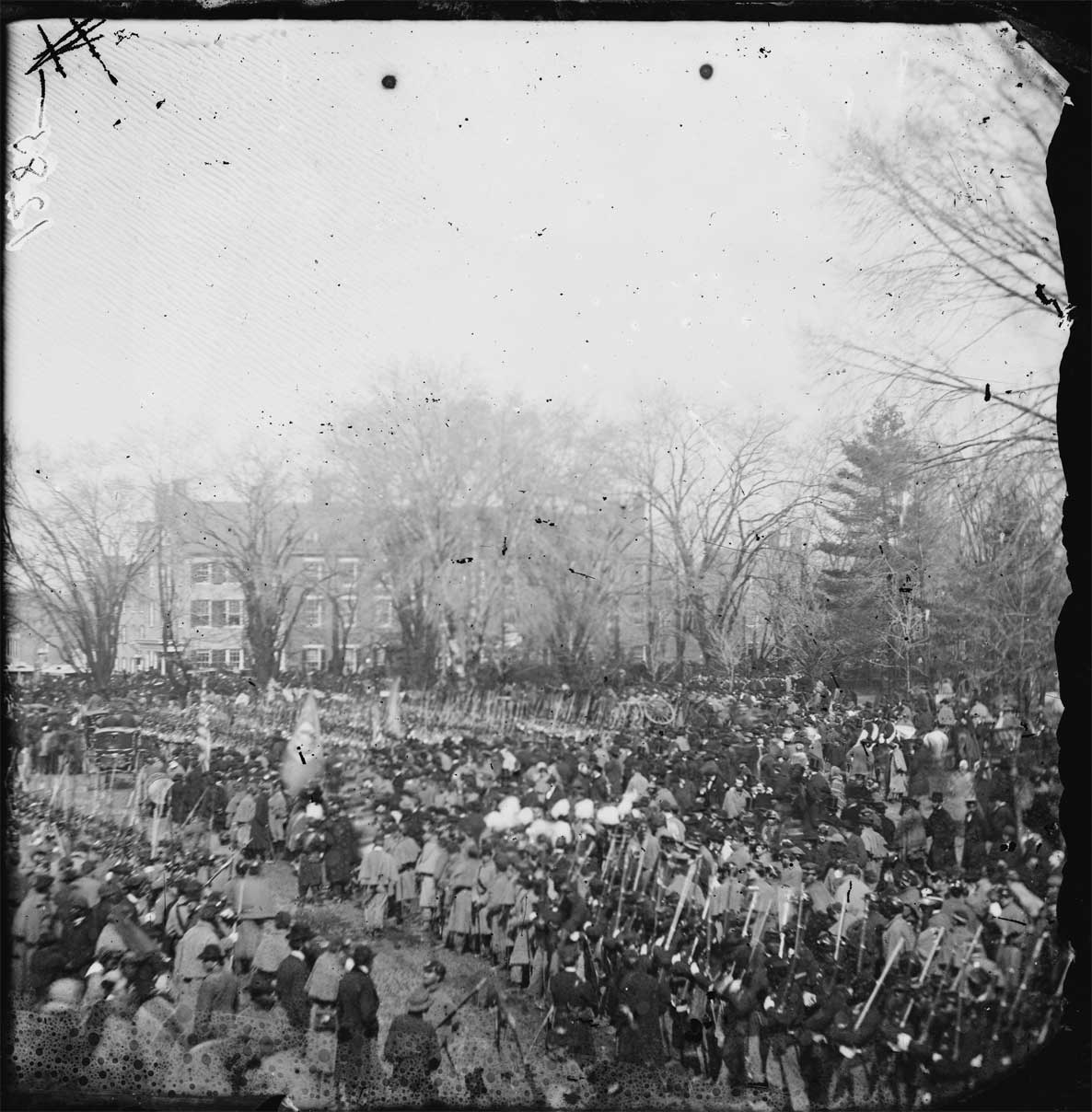
African American U.S. troops marching at Lincoln's second inauguration.

Abraham Lincoln delivered his second inaugural address on Saturday, March 4, 1865, during his second inauguration as President of the United States. Despite victory over secessionists in the American Civil War being days away and slavery in all of the U.S. nearing an end, Lincoln did not speak of happiness, but of sadness. Some see this speech as a defense of his pragmatic approach to Reconstruction, in which he sought to avoid harsh treatment of the defeated rebels by reminding his listeners of how wrong both sides had been in imagining what lay before them when the war began four years earlier. Lincoln balanced that rejection of triumphalism with recognition of the unmistakable evil of slavery. The address is inscribed, along with the Gettysburg Address, in the Lincoln Memorial.

== Sources and theme ==
Lincoln used his second inaugural address to touch on the question of Divine providence. He wondered what God's will might have been in allowing the war to come, and why it had assumed such terrible dimensions. He endeavored to address some of these dilemmas, using allusions taken from the Bible.

Lincoln reiterated the cause of the war, slavery, in saying that "slaves constituted a peculiar and powerful interest. All knew that this interest was somehow the cause of the war."

The words "wringing their bread from the sweat of other men's faces" are an allusion to the Fall of Man in the Book of Genesis. As a result of Adam's sin, God tells Adam that henceforth "In the sweat of thy face shalt thou eat bread, till thou return unto the ground; for out of it wast thou taken: for dust thou art, and unto dust shalt thou return" (Genesis 3:19).

Lincoln's phrase, "but let us judge not, that we be not judged," is an allusion to the words of Jesus in Matthew 7:1 which in the King James Version reads, "Judge not, that ye be not judged."

Lincoln quoted another of Jesus' sayings: "Woe unto the world because of offenses; for it must needs be that offenses come, but woe to that man by whom the offense cometh." Lincoln's quoted language comes from Matthew 18:7; a similar discourse by Jesus appears in Luke 17:1.

Lincoln suggested that the death and destruction wrought by the civil war was divine retribution to the U.S. for 250 years of slavery, saying that God may will that the war continue "until every drop of blood drawn with the lash shall be paid by another drawn with the sword", and that the war was the country's "woe due". The quotation "the judgments of the Lord are true and righteous altogether" is from Psalm 19:9.

The closing paragraph contains two additional glosses from scripture. "[L]et us strive on to ... bind up the nation's wounds" is a reworking of Psalm 147:3. "[T]o care for him who shall have borne the battle and for his widow and his orphan" comes from James 1:27.

Lincoln's point seems to be that God's purposes are not directly knowable to humans. After Lincoln's death, his secretaries found among his papers an undated manuscript now generally known as the "Meditations on the Divine Will." In that manuscript, Lincoln wrote:

The will of God prevails—In great contests each party claims to act in accordance with the will of God. Both may be, and one must be wrong. God cannot be for, and against the same thing at the same time. In the present civil war it is quite possible that God's purpose is somewhat different from the purpose of either party—and yet the human instrumentalities, working just as they do, are of the best adaptation to effect this.

Lincoln's sense that the divine will was unknowable stood in marked contrast to sentiments popular at the time. In the popular mind, both sides of the Civil War assumed that they could read God's will and assumed His favor in their opposing causes. Julia Ward Howe's "Battle Hymn of the Republic" expressed the sentiment common among the supporters of the U.S. cause, that the U.S. was waging a righteous war that served God's purposes. "Mine eyes have seen the glory of the coming of the Lord...." Similarly, the Confederacy chose Deo vindice as its motto, often translated as "God will vindicate us." Lincoln, responding to compliments from Thurlow Weed on the speech, said, "I believe it is not immediately popular. Men are not flattered by being shown that there has been a difference of purpose between the Almighty and them."

== Inaugural speech ==
Fellow-Countrymen:

At this second appearing to take the oath of the Presidential office there is less occasion for an extended address than there was at the first. Then a statement somewhat in detail of a course to be pursued seemed fitting and proper. Now, at the expiration of four years, during which public declarations have been constantly called forth on every point and phase of this great contest which is of primary concern to the nation as a whole, little that is new could be presented. The progress of our arms, upon which all else chiefly depends, is as well known to the public as to myself, and it is, I trust, reasonably satisfactory and encouraging to all. With high hope for the future, no prediction in regard to it is ventured.

On the occasion corresponding to this four years ago all thoughts were anxiously directed to an impending civil war. All dreaded it, all sought to avert it. While the inaugural address was being delivered from this place, devoted altogether to saving the Union without war, insurgent agents were in the city seeking to destroy it without war—seeking to dissolve the Union and divide effects by negotiation. Both parties deprecated war, but one of them would make war rather than let the nation survive, and the other would accept war rather than let it perish. And the war came.

One-eighth of the whole population were colored slaves, not distributed generally over the Union, but localized in the southern part of it. These slaves constituted a peculiar and powerful interest. All knew that this interest was somehow the cause of the war. To strengthen, perpetuate, and extend this interest was the object for which the insurgents would rend the Union even by war, while the Government claimed no right to do more than to restrict the territorial enlargement of it. Neither party expected for the war the magnitude or the duration which it has already attained. Neither anticipated that the cause of the conflict might cease with or even before the conflict itself should cease. Each looked for an easier triumph, and a result less fundamental and astounding. Both read the same Bible and pray to the same God, and each invokes His aid against the other. It may seem strange that any men should dare to ask a just God's assistance in wringing their bread from the sweat of other men's faces, but let us judge not, that we be not judged. The prayers of both could not be answered. That of neither has been answered fully. The Almighty has His own purposes. "Woe unto the world because of offenses; for it must needs be that offenses come, but woe to that man by whom the offense cometh." If we shall suppose that American slavery is one of those offenses which, in the providence of God, must needs come, but which, having continued through His appointed time, He now wills to remove, and that He gives to both North and South this terrible war as the woe due to those by whom the offense came, shall we discern therein any departure from those divine attributes which the believers in a living God always ascribe to Him? Fondly do we hope, fervently do we pray, that this mighty scourge of war may speedily pass away. Yet, if God wills that it continue until all the wealth piled by the bondsman's two hundred and fifty years of unrequited toil shall be sunk, and until every drop of blood drawn with the lash shall be paid by another drawn with the sword, as was said three thousand years ago, so still it must be said "the judgments of the Lord are true and righteous altogether."

With malice toward none, with charity for all, with firmness in the right as God gives us to see the right, let us strive on to finish the work we are in, to bind up the nation's wounds, to care for him who shall have borne the battle and for his widow and his orphan, to do all which may achieve and cherish a just and lasting peace among ourselves and with all nations.

— Abraham Lincoln

Second Inaugural Address
Read for LibriVox by Winston Tharp
00:05:42

Among those present for this speech was actor John Wilkes Booth, who jumped out from the crowd behind Lincoln's procession and ran towards him, but was stopped by Benjamin Brown French, possibly saving Lincoln's life. On April 14, 1865, just over a month after Lincoln's second inauguration, Booth assassinated Lincoln.

== In popular culture ==
- An excerpt of the speech was dramatized in the 2012 Steven Spielberg film Lincoln, with Daniel Day-Lewis portraying Lincoln.
- An excerpt of the speech was dramatized in the two-hour 2013 National Geographic Channel political docudrama Killing Lincoln, with Billy Campbell portraying Lincoln.
- American composer Vincent Persichetti used text from the speech for his work A Lincoln Address that had been scheduled for President Richard Nixon's inaugural concert January 19, 1973, but was removed from the program after someone in the administration read the text and decided the President would be embarrassed by the excerpt "Fondly do we hope ... that this mighty scourge of war may speedily pass away." Ironically, four days later, the Vietnam Peace Accords were signed.

== See also ==
- Lincoln's first inaugural address
- Andrew Johnson's drunken vice-presidential inaugural address
