= Noah Brooks =

American journalist and editor (1830–1903)

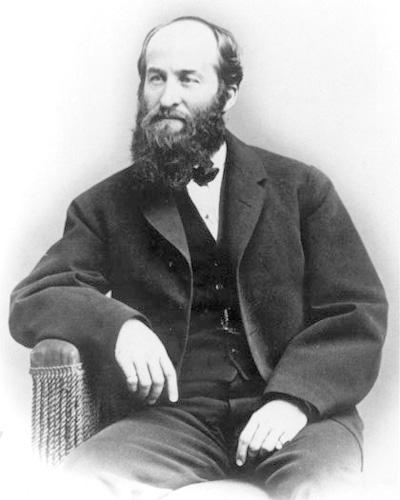
- Born: October 25, 1830; Castine, Maine
- Died: August 16, 1903 (aged 72); Pasadena, California
- Occupations: Journalist; author; editor
- Known for: Washington in Lincoln's Time
- Spouse: Caroline Augusta Fellows

Noah Brooks (October 24, 1830 – August 16, 1903) was an American journalist and editor who worked for newspapers in Sacramento, San Francisco, Newark, and New York. He is known for writing a major biography of Abraham Lincoln based on close personal observation.

== Career ==
Born in Castine, Maine, he moved to Dixon, Illinois in 1856, where he became involved in John C. Frémont's campaign for president. During the campaign, he became friends with Abraham Lincoln. Brooks moved to Kansas in 1857 as a "free state" settler, but returned to Illinois about a year later, then moved to California in 1859. After the death of his wife in 1862, Brooks moved to Washington, D.C. to cover the Lincoln administration for the Sacramento Daily Union. He was accepted into the Lincoln household as an old friend; Michael Burlingame writes that "few people were as close to Lincoln as Brooks, a kind of surrogate son to the president, who was twenty years his senior". Unlike most people, Brooks was able to maintain a close friendship with both the President and Mrs. Lincoln. When Brooks was detailed to cover the 1864 Democratic Convention in Chicago, President Lincoln asked Brooks to also report back in detail by private letter.

In 1884, Brooks wrote the first novel exclusively about baseball: Our Base Ball Club and how It Won the Championship.

Brooks' 258 Washington dispatches for the Sacramento Daily Union were published under the name "Castine." In 1895, Brooks published his biography of Lincoln, Washington in Lincoln's Time, based on his Castine articles, as well as personal observations and interviews. The book is now considered an indispensable source of information on the Lincoln White House.

In 1901, Brooks published The Story of the Lewis and Clark Expedition based largely on the Nicholas Biddle history of the expedition. Brooks was assisted by the notes written in the margins of his manuscript by Dr. Elliott Coues, who had edited the 1894 edition of Biddle, and who had wide experience as an explorer of the American West.

In the 2017 documentary film The Gettysburg Address, Brooks is portrayed by actor Jason Alexander.
