= Spencer House (Cincinnati) =

Historic hotel (1853–1933)

Coordinates: 39.0971°N 84.5054°W

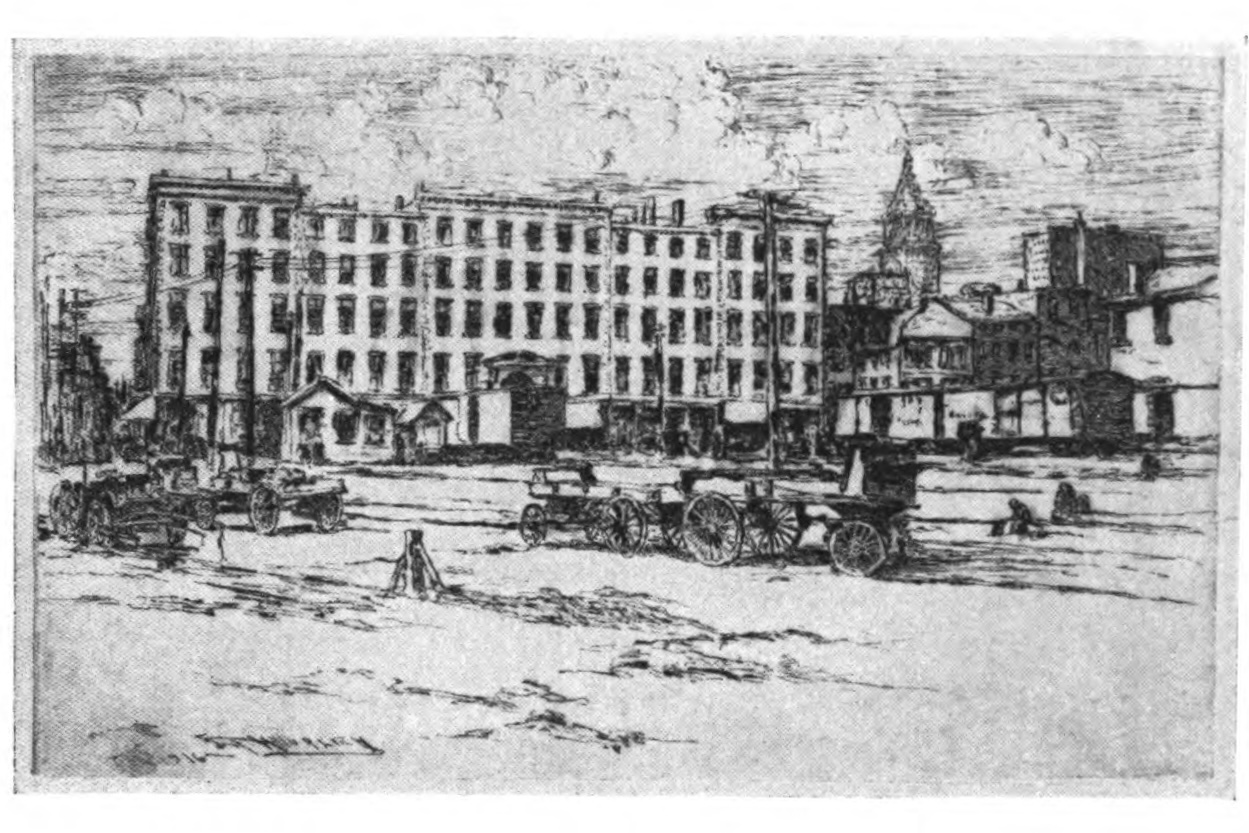
Spencer House (Cincinnati) etching made by E. T. Hurley before 1910

Spencer House was a historic hotel in Cincinnati, Ohio, United States. Opened in 1853, it was condemned in 1933. Spencer House was located on the southwest corner of Broadway and Front in an area known as the Bottoms, adjacent to the Public Landing, which was the city's major Ohio River dock.

== History ==
Prior to the construction of Spencer House, the Cincinnati Hotel stood in the same location. Spencer House opened with a grand ball in December 1853. The actress Charlotte Cushman was an owner. According to a history published in 1923, in the 1850s, the Spencer was considered a summer resort for Southern families. In 1860 a guest from Louisville, Kentucky wrote:

To those who are called to Cincinnati by business or pleasure, I would commend the Spencer House. Its location on the banks of the beautiful river renders it airy and free from dust, while the varied panorama of the opposite scenery in Kentucky, the Licking river, Covington, Newport, the forests of chimney stacks from a fleet of steamboats, and all the life, bustle, and business animation of the Queen City of the West, furnish plenty of employment for the eye and cause the time to pass away pleasantly."

During the American Civil War, the Spencer was considered the city's Copperhead hotel, while the Burnet House was known as the Federal hotel. The Spencer reportedly had a soundproof room originally intended for gamblers that was used during the American Civil War for strategy meetings. It is possibly apocryphal but Copperhead politician Clement L. Vallandingham was supposedly arrested at the Spencer at the height of the war. Spencer House was one of the stops on Andrew Johnson's 1866 Swing Around the Circle electioneering tour. He visited again after his impeachment trial.

As steamboat traffic declined in economic significance during the second half of the 19th century the hotel struggled and it was eventually converted to a tenement house. By the 1930s it was in such poor condition that only people without children in their households were allowed to live there. It was condemned in 1933.
