= Burnet House =

Cincinnati, Ohio hotel (1850–1926)

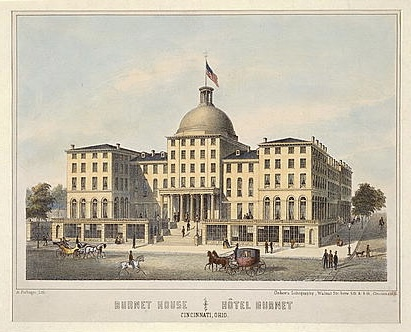
- Burnet House in Cincinnati, pictured 1850s
- Interactive map of the Burnet House area

General information
- Coordinates: 39.0986°N 84.5123°W
- Construction started: October 11, 1848
- Opened: May 3, 1850
- Demolished: 1926

Design and construction
- Architect: Isaiah Rogers

Burnet House was a grand hotel that stood at the corner of Third and Vine in Cincinnati, Ohio in the United States from 1850 to 1926. In its day the Burnet hosted a multitude of dignitaries, including Abraham Lincoln (twice), Edward VII of the United Kingdom (when he was still Prince of Wales), and Jenny Lind. The hotel was demolished in 1926 to make way for an annex to the Union Central Building.

== History ==
The hotel was named for Jacob Burnet, a judge of the Ohio Supreme Court, who was an investor in the project and on whose land the hotel was constructed. After it was Burnet's farm, the site later became an "amusement park" called Shires' Garden.

The developer was Abraham Coleman, a Cincinnati civic booster, who raised $2.5 million from 170 investors. Isaiah Rogers, nationally acclaimed as a designer of elite hotels, was hired for $150,000. The interior design was done by Francis Pedretti. Cincinnati was the sixth-largest city in the country when Burnet House opened in 1850; the hotel became nationally acclaimed and was the state's premiere hotel well into the 1870s. Burnet House was one of a handful of American hotels with a gilded dome. Circa 1879 it had 240 guest rooms, as well as parlors, reading rooms, smoking rooms, billiard rooms, bath rooms, a bar and a restaurant. According to one 20th-century history of American hotels the Burnet "out-gadgeted the hotels of New York and was as sumptuously furnished and had as great a layout of public rooms as any hotel of its day. It was, besides, the most distinguished hotel architecturally." In 1857 a visiting Englishman reviewed it after visiting Mammoth Cave in Kentucky, writing home, "We seem to be in an excellent hotel; the Burnet House, very large, clean, and comfortable, and good food, which is most desirable, for such rubbish as we have eaten cannot be good for any one. So far from the passage making me ill, I never was better in my life."

He outlined the workings of the hotel for his mother, noting that Cincinnati was less than half the size of the great British industrial city of Manchester:

I have told you before something of the way these immense establishments are managed, but I think this the most perfect I have seen: you enter a large square hall, the roof supported by pillars, the floor paved with alternate squares of black and white marble; facing the entrance is a large marble counter, behind which stands the clerk; on this counter there is a book, in which each guest writes his name on arrival, and then the number of the room is written in another column; a third part is left, in which the clerk puts the time of your arrival, thus: B., D., T., or S. stands for an arrival in time for Breakfast, Dinner, Tea, or Supper, and L., if too late for any meal. Your key is then given to you, your luggage pointed out, carried up, and you are free of the house; the general charge is two dollars and a half per day, some places three; no extras...On the right of the office is a washing-room, provided with basins, mirrors, and plenty of clean towels; on the left, a telegraphic office, so that without leaving the house you may send and receive a message from any part of the States or Canada. There is a large magnificent drawing-room, luxuriously furnished, and two comfortable smoking and writing rooms, an immense dining-room completes the public part of the house. On the ground floor are tailor's, haberdasher's, barber's, and cigar shops, with a bar, hot and cold baths, and in the hall a small marble stand for the sale of cigars. Attached to the house are some three or four boys, who sell newspapers, and these little urchins, precocious beyond their years, board there, and eat and drink at the public table...Wines of course are extra, and any meals served in private; there is no bowing and scraping or cringing to rich people, all are on exactly the same footing—great civility, but nothing more. When the system is well carried out it is an excellent one; when it is not it is execrable, for you have no appeal. "Don't like it; well then, leave it."

When Abraham Lincoln campaigned in Cincinnati in 1860, he spoke at the Burnet, "speaking from a balcony to a large crowd gathered below him on Third Street. He was telling his listeners what he thought about slavery. He talked in a loud voice, and said he wanted it to be loud enough to carry across the river. 'I want Kentuckians to hear me,' he declared." The Burnet House was considered the city's leading Union hotel during the American Civil War, whereas the Spencer House (opened 1853) "was known as a 'Copperhead hotel'." Some accounts have it that Sherman and Grant planned the former's March to the Sea in Parlor A of the Burnet House, but similar claims have made about Galt House in Louisville (debunked), and locations in Chattanooga, Nashville, and Washington, D.C. In later years a library at the hotel was home to "the library and portrait collection of the Loyal Legion, whose membership consisted of officers who served in the Union Army during the Civil War."

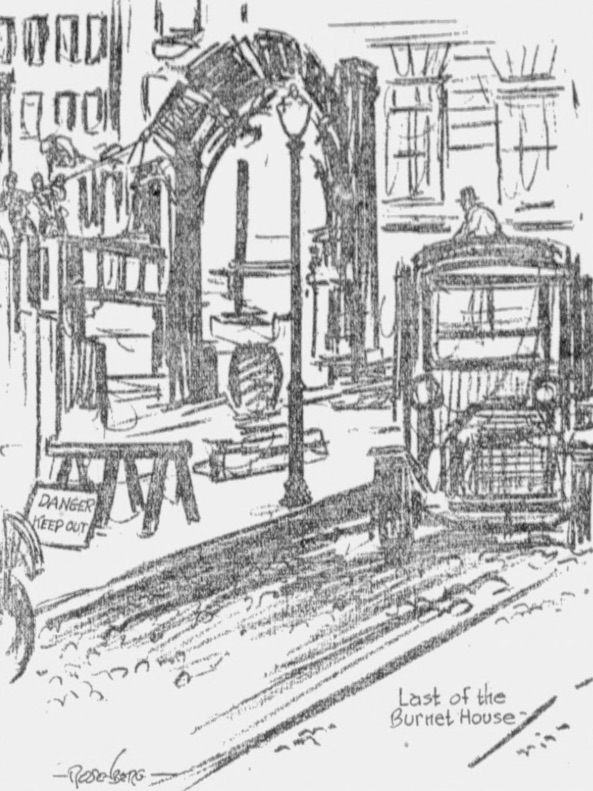
"Last of the Burnet House" by Manuel Rosenberg, October 1926

In January 1926, the Union Central Life Insurance Company purchased the Burnet House in order to build an annex for the Union Central Building. Demolition began on July 16 of that year with a formal farewell ceremony. Union Central president John D. Sage, accompanied by people dressed as famous guests of the hotel, initiated the demolition by striking a piece of marble with an axe. Mayor Murray Seasongood was the ceremony's principal speaker, stating that "it is progress for the old to make way for the new, but it is best to preserve the recollections of the old, and to imbue the new with its spirit". Destruction was largely complete by mid-October.

== See also ==
- History of Cincinnati
- Cincinnati in the American Civil War
- Charlotte Cushman
