= Eutaw House =

Historical Baltimore hotel (1835–1912)

Coordinates: 39.2896°N 76.6213°W

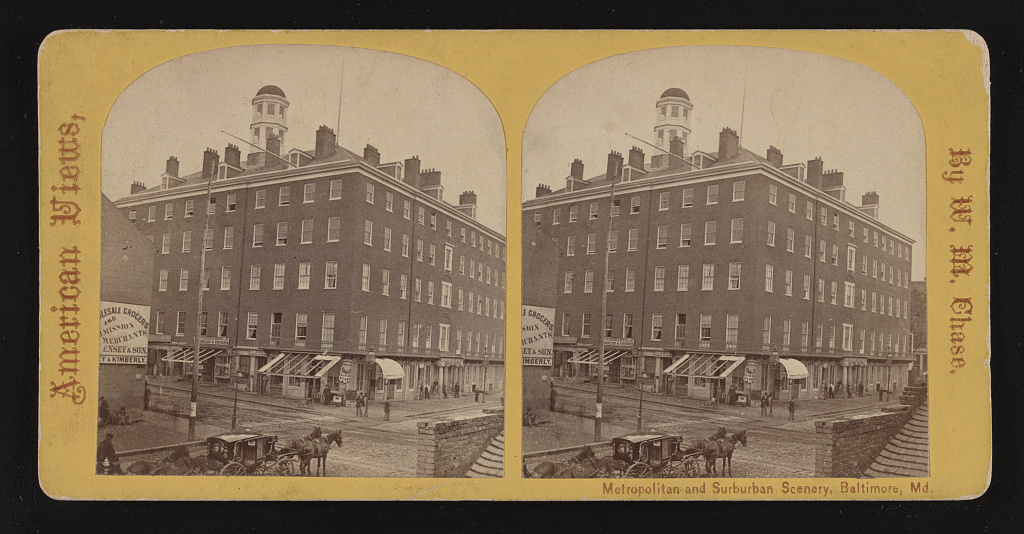
Eutaw House c. 1870 (LOC LC-DIG-stereo-1s12946)

Eutaw House was a notable 19th-century hotel of Baltimore, Maryland, in the United States. Constructed beginning in 1832, officially opened in 1835, Eutaw House was located at the northwest corner of Baltimore and Eutaw Streets.

== History ==
Designed by Samuel Harris, it offered 19,000 ft^{2} of floor space and approximately 230 guest rooms. One of the first guests was William Henry Harrison, and in 1838 "the roof was partly blown off by the same tornado that blew down a section of the wall of the Front Street Theater." Robert Garrett & Sons bought the prestigious hotel in 1845 and upgraded it further, and owned it until it was demolished. In 1859, Robert Coleman, who had run Astor House in New York, took charge of the Eutaw. Abraham Lincoln stayed at the Eutaw House on the way to his inauguration in 1861. Andrew Johnson stopped at the Eutaw on the last leg of his Swing Around the Circle political tour in 1866.

From 1894 it housed the headquarters of the Maryland Democratic Party. The building was gutted by fire in 1912, just before the 1912 Democratic National Convention, and torn down shortly thereafter. The building was replaced with a "theater for motion pictures and vaudeville."
