= Cox (surname) =

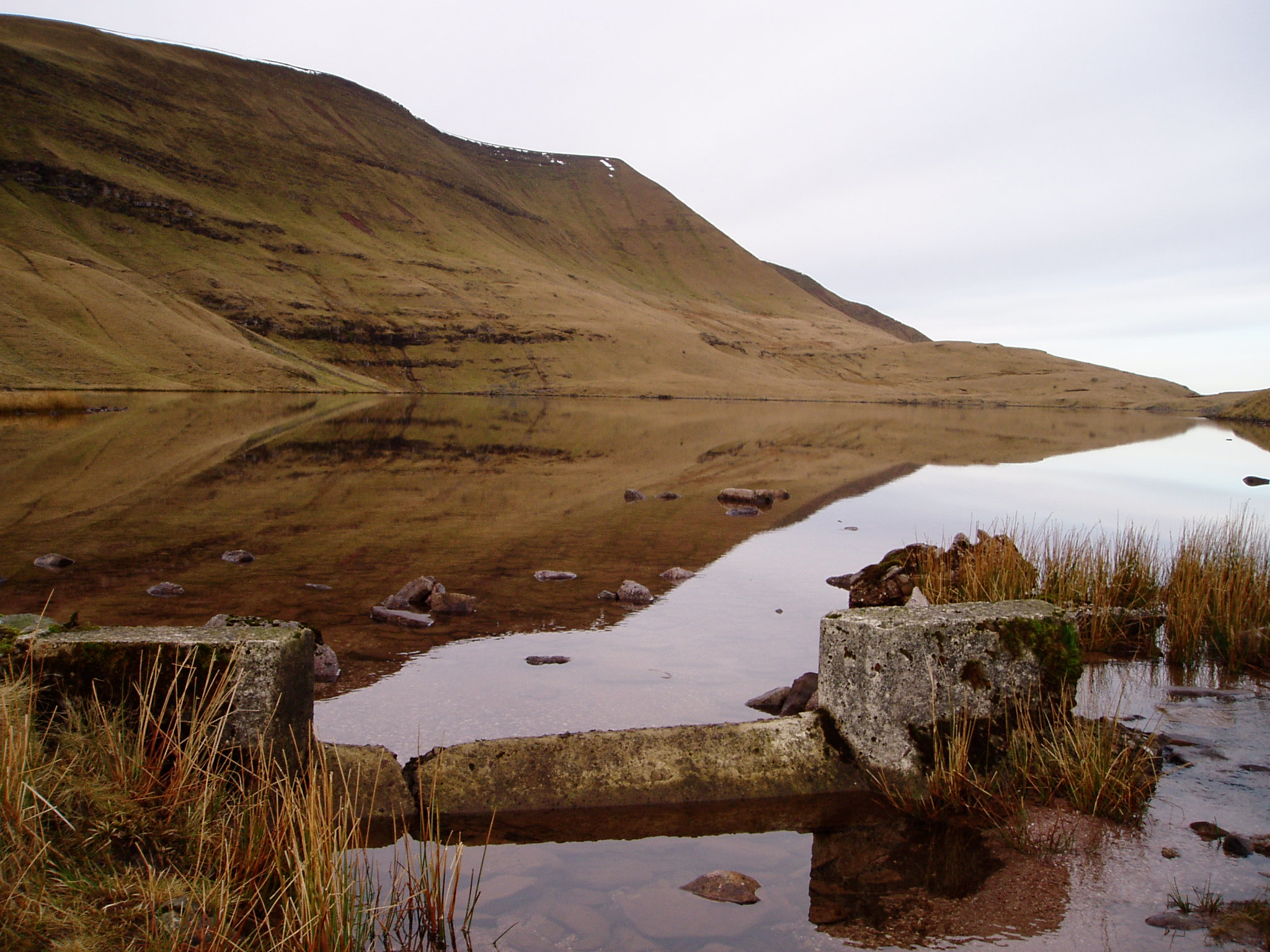
- The hills found in Carmarthenshire, Wales, where Cox may have been a topographic name for a man "from the red hills".
- Pronunciation: /ˈkɒks/ KOKS
- Language: Old English or Welsh

Origin
- Meaning: Possibly derived from cock or coch, and means "from the hills", or from cocc, which means "the little", or derived from coch, meaning "the Red".
- Region of origin: England or Wales

The surname Cox is of English or Welsh origin, and may have originated independently in several places in Great Britain, with the variations arriving at a standard spelling only later. There are also two native Scottish and Irish surnames which were anglicised into Cox.

An early record of the surname dates from 1556 with the marriage of Alicea Cox at St. Martin in the Fields, Westminster, London. Cox is the 69th-most common surname in the United Kingdom.

== Origin ==
One possibility of the origin is that it is a version of the Old English cocc which means "the little", and was sometimes put after the name of a leader or chieftain as a term of endearment. Surnames such as Wilcox, Willcocks and Willcox are examples of this practice: all are composed of the name William and the archaic word cocc, coming together to mean "little William". The suggestion is that only the element -cox may have endured as a surname for some families.

Another opinion is that the name is derived from the Old English cock, which means a "heap" or "mound", and was a topographic name for a man living near any heap, hill or other bundle. Names like Haycock or Haycox come from such practice, meaning from "the hay mounds" or "the hay fields". Again, the element -cox may have only been carried on in some families.

The third possibility is that it comes from the Welsh coch, meaning "red". In this opinion, the word could have either been applied to a man with red hair, calling him in essence "the Red", or else served as a topographic name for someone living near the ruddy-hued hills found in Wales, implying that the man is "from the red hills". In Cornwall, the surnames Cock and Couch (pronounced 'cooch') also derive from Cornish cogh "red, scarlet".

As a Cornish surname, Cock can also derive from cok, "fishing boat", the Cornish surname "Cocking" being the diminutive form cokyn, "small fishing boat". In these cases, the surname is likely to derive from occupation.

The English word "cock" (US English "rooster"), is derived from the Anglo-Saxon word cocc, and a fourth possibility is that the surname came about as a nickname.

Another possibility is that the name is of Norman origin. In the Battle of Hastings in October 1066, Alric Le Coq was one of Duke William's companions. Alric was said to have been a "a strutting {as a rooster struts} Norman soldier ... who was nicknamed 'le coq' and his children 'little cockes.'" Le Coq could easily have been Anglicized to Cox as seen in the previous possibility.

The surname Cox is also native to Belgian and Dutch Limburg. This name, like the related Cockx, is a degenerate form of Cocceius, a latinization of Kok (English: cook).

Noticeably similar surnames include Cock, Cocks, Coxe, Coxen and Coxon. There is no evidence beyond similar spellings and phonetics that these surnames are related. Given that the origins of the Cox surname are uncertain, it is possible that these names developed as spelling variations, or that each of these names has an origin in a separate word and language.

The origins of the surname in North America are speculated across several written accounts, with most sources pointing towards three distinct families arriving from England in the 17th and 18th centuries: in 1690, brothers Thomas, William, and Walter Cocke originally of Surry; in 1705, the family of Dr. Wilham Cocke of Williamsburg; and at an unknown time before 1658, Nicholas Cocke of Middlesex.

== Notable people with the surname "Cox" include ==
=== A ===
- Aaron Cox (born 1965), American football player
- Abbie Cox (1902–1985), Canadian ice hockey player
- Adam Cox (born 1986), British artistic gymnast
- Adrian Cox (born 1980), Australian rules footballer
- Aimee Cox, American anthropologist
- Ainslee Cox (1936–1988), American conductor
- Alan Cox (disambiguation), multiple people
- Alaqua Cox (born 1997), American actress
- Albert Cox (disambiguation), multiple people
- Alexander Cox (disambiguation), multiple people
- Alf Cox (1919–2008), Australian rugby league footballer
- Alfred Cox (disambiguation), multiple people
- Alison Cox (born 1979), American rower
- Allyn Cox (1896–1982), American artist
- Alphonso Cox (1908–1964), American baseball player
- Amanda Cox (born 1980), American journalist
- Amber Cox (born 1973/1974), American sports executive
- Ana Marie Cox (born 1972), American blogger
- André Cox (born 1954), Zimbabwean General of The Salvation Army
- Andrew Cox (born 1964), Australian rower
- Andy Cox (born 1956), British guitarist
- Anna Cox, British neuroscientist
- Anthony Cox (disambiguation), multiple people
- Archibald Cox (1912–2004), American politician
- Arisa Cox (born 1978), Canadian television personality
- Arthur Cox (disambiguation), multiple people
- Ashley Cox (born 1956), American model and actress
- Austin Cox (born 1997), American baseball player

=== B ===
- Barbara Cox (disambiguation), multiple people
- Barry Cox (rugby league) (born 1949), Australian rugby league footballer
- Barry Cox (singer), British-Chinese singer
- Bell Cox (1826–1897), Irish priest
- Ben Cox (born 1992), English cricketer
- Beris Cox (1948–2023), British biostratigrapher and palaeontologist
- Benjamin Cox (disambiguation), multiple people
- Berkley Cox (1934–2024), Australian rules footballer
- Bill Cox (disambiguation), multiple people
- Billy Cox (born 1941), American bass guitarist
- Billy Cox (baseball) (1919–1978), American baseball player
- Bobby Cox (disambiguation), multiple people
- Brad Cox (disambiguation), multiple people
- Bradford Cox (born 1982), American singer-songwriter
- Brandon Cox (born 1983), American football player
- Brandon Cox (politician) (born 1974), American politician
- Brenda Cox (1944–2015), Australian sprinter
- Brennan Cox (born 1998), Australian rules footballer
- Brent Cox, American politician
- Brenton Cox Jr. (born 2000), American football player
- Brian Cox (disambiguation), multiple people
- Britteny Cox (born 1994), Australian skier
- Bronwyn Cox (born 1997), Australian rower
- Bruce Cox (1918–2004), American photographer
- Bryan Cox (born 1968), American football player and coach
- Bryan Cox Jr. (born 1994), American football player
- Bryan-Michael Cox (born 1977), American songwriter
- Bud Cox (born 1960), American tennis player

=== C ===
- Calli Cox (born 1977), American pornographic actress
- Camden Cox (born 1990), English electronic dance musician
- Canela Cox (born 1984), American singer-songwriter
- Captain Cox, English collector
- Carl Cox (born 1962), British musician
- Carmiesha Cox (born 1995), Bahamian sprinter
- Carol Cox, American drag racer
- Caroline Cox (born 1937), English politician
- Cary Cox (1917–1991), American football player
- Casey Cox (1941–2023), American baseball player
- Cassidy Cox (born 1998), American archer
- Catherine Cox (disambiguation), multiple people
- Cathy Cox (disambiguation), multiple people
- C. C. Cox (1887–1915), American race car driver
- Cedric Cox (1913–1993), Canadian technician and politician
- Cedric Cox (footballer) (born 1997), Australian rules footballer
- Chandler Cox (born 1996), American football player
- Channing H. Cox (1879–1968), American politician
- Chapman B. Cox (born 1940), American military advisor
- Charles Cox (disambiguation), multiple people
- Charly Cox (born 1995), British poet
- Cheryl Cox (born 1949), American politician
- Chip Cox (born 1983), American football player
- Chris Cox (disambiguation), multiple people
- Christina Cox (born 1971), Canadian actress
- Christopher Cox (disambiguation), multiple people
- Chubby Cox (born 1955), American basketball player
- Cindy Cox (born 1961), American composer
- C. J. Cox (born 2004), American basketball player
- Claire Cox (born 1975), British actress
- Clay Cox (born 1968), American politician
- Colin Cox (1922–1989), Australian rules footballer
- Comer Cox (1905–1971), American baseball player
- Conor Cox (born 1992), Irish Gaelic footballer
- Constance Cox (1912–1998), British scriptwriter
- Courteney Cox (born 1964), American actress
- Courtney Cox (disambiguation), multiple people
- Crystal Cox (born 1979), American track and field athlete
- Curome Cox (born 1981), American football player

=== D ===
- Dakota Cox (born 1994), American football player
- Damien Cox (born 1961), Canadian journalist
- Daniel Cox (disambiguation), multiple people
- Danielle Cox (born 1992), English footballer
- Danny Cox (disambiguation), multiple people
- Darius Cox (born 1983), Bermudian footballer
- Darren Cox (born 1974), British businessman
- Darron Cox (born 1967), American baseball player
- Darryl Cox (disambiguation), multiple people
- Dave Cox (1938–2010), American politician
- David Cox (disambiguation), multiple people
- Dayna Cox (born 1993), Australian rules footballer
- Dean Cox (born 1981), Australian rules footballer
- Dean Cox (English footballer) (born 1987), English footballer
- Deb Cox (born 1958), Australian screenwriter
- Deborah Cox (born 1971), Canadian singer
- Demetrious Cox (born 1994), American football player
- Denise Cox, American geologist
- Dennis Cox (1925–2001), English cricketer
- Derek Cox (born 1986), American football player
- Derek Cox (athlete) (1931–2008), English athlete
- Dick Cox (1897–1966), American baseball player
- Doak Cox (1917–2003), American geologist
- Doc Cox (born 1946), British television personality
- Donald Cox (disambiguation), multiple people
- Donna Cox, American professor
- Dorinda Cox (born 1977), Australian politician
- Dorothy Cox (disambiguation), multiple people
- Doug Cox (disambiguation), multiple people
- Douglas Cox (disambiguation), multiple people

=== E ===
- Earnest Cox (disambiguation), multiple people
- E. B. Cox (1914–2003), Canadian sculptor
- Ed Cox (disambiguation), multiple people
- Edgar William Cox (1882–1918), British intelligence officer
- Edward Cox (disambiguation), multiple people
- Edwin Cox (disambiguation), multiple people
- Elbert Frank Cox (1895–1969), American mathematician
- Eleanor Worthington Cox (born 2001), British actress
- Eli Cox (born 2000), American football player
- Elijah Albert Cox (1876–1955), British painter
- Elijah Allen Cox (1887–1974), American judge
- Elizabeth Cox (disambiguation), multiple people
- Elliot Cox (born 2007), American racing driver
- Emily Cox (disambiguation), multiple people
- Emma Cox (born 1992), Australian sport shooter
- Emmett Ripley Cox (1935–2021), American judge
- Eric Cox (1923–2006), Australian rugby league footballer
- Erin Nealy Cox (born 1970), American attorney
- Erle Cox (1873–1950), Australian writer
- Ernest Cox (disambiguation), multiple people
- Ernie Cox (Canadian football) (1894–1962), Canadian football player
- Ernie Cox (baseball) (1894–1974), American baseball player
- E. S. Cox (disambiguation), multiple people
- Ethan Cox (born 1987), Canadian ice hockey player
- Ethel Cox (1888–?), British suffragette
- Euan Hillhouse Methven Cox (1893–1977), English botanist
- Eugene Saint Julien Cox (1834–1898), American politician
- Eva Cox (born 1938), Australian writer

=== F ===
- Fletcher Cox (born 1990), American football player
- Frances Elizabeth Cox (1812–1879), English translator
- Francis Cox (disambiguation), multiple people
- Francisco José Cox (1933–2020), Chilean prelate
- Frank Cox (disambiguation), multiple people
- Franklin Cox (born 1961), American composer
- Freddie Cox (1920–1973), English football player
- Frederic Cox (1905–1985), British singer
- Frederick Cox (disambiguation), multiple people
- Frosty Cox (1908–1962), American basketball coach
- F. W. Cox (1817–1904), Australian pastor

=== G ===
- Gardner Cox (1920–1988), American sailor
- Garfield V. Cox (1893–1970), American economist
- Gary Cox (disambiguation), multiple people
- Gene Cox (1935–2009), American football coach
- Geoffrey Cox (disambiguation), multiple people
- George Cox (disambiguation), multiple people
- Geraldine Cox (born 1945), Australian orphanage administrator
- Gerard Cox (1940–2025), Dutch singer
- Gershom Cox (1863–1918), English footballer
- Gertrude Mary Cox (1900–1978), American statistician
- Gilbert Cox (1908–1974), English cricketer
- Glenn Cox (1931–2012), American baseball player
- Grace Victoria Cox (born 1995), Australian actress
- Graham Cox (disambiguation), multiple people
- Greg Cox (disambiguation), multiple people
- Guillermo Larco Cox (1932–2002), Peruvian politician
- Gustavus Cox (1870–1958), Barbadian cricketer

=== H ===
- Hampden Cox (1886–1940), Barbadian cricketer
- Han Cox (1899–1979), Dutch rower
- Hardin Cox (1928–2013), American politician
- Harold Cox (disambiguation), multiple people
- Harry Cox (disambiguation), multiple people
- Harvey Cox (born 1929), American theologian
- Hayden Cox (born 1982), Australian entrepreneur
- Heather Cox (born 1970), American sportscaster
- Herb Cox (1950–2025), Canadian politician
- Herbert Charles Fahie Cox (1893–1973), British lawyer
- Henry Cox (disambiguation), multiple people
- Hiram Cox (1760–1799), British diplomat
- Homer Harold Cox (1921–1954), American policeman
- Homersham Cox (disambiguation), multiple people
- Horace Cox (??–1918), English publisher
- Howard Cox, British academic
- Howard Cox (British politician) (born 1954), British politician
- H. R. Cox (1907–1986), American bacteriologist
- Hudson B. Cox, American lawyer

=== I ===
- Ian Cox (born 1971), Trinidadian footballer
- Ian Cox (cricketer) (born 1967), English cricketer
- Ida Cox (1896–1967), American musician
- Idris Cox (1899–1989), Welsh community activist
- Ingemar Cox, English computer scientist
- Irwin Cox (1838–1922), British barrister
- Isaac Cox (disambiguation), multiple people
- Isabel Cox (born 2000), American soccer player

=== J ===
- Jabril Cox (born 1998), American football player
- Jacob Cox (1810–1892), American painter
- Jacob Dolson Cox (1828–1900), American soldier and politician
- Jack Cox (disambiguation), multiple people
- Jackie Cox (disambiguation), multiple people
- Jamael Cox (born 1992), American soccer player
- James Cox (disambiguation), multiple people
- Jamie Cox (born 1969), Australian cricketer
- Jamie Cox (boxer) (born 1986), British boxer
- Jan Cox (disambiguation), multiple people
- Janae Cox (born 1985), American gymnast
- Jane Cox (born 1952), English actress
- Jane Cox, Irish lighting designer
- J. B. Cox (born 1984), American baseball player
- J'den Cox (born 1995), American wrestler
- Jean Cox (1922–2012), American tenor
- Jeff Cox (disambiguation), multiple people
- Jennifer Elise Cox (born 1969), American actress
- Jennings Cox (1866–1913), American mining engineer
- Jeremy Cox (born 1996), American football player
- Jeromy Cox (born 1970), American colorist
- Jesse Cox (disambiguation), multiple people
- Jessica Cox (born 1983), American pilot
- Jim Cox (disambiguation), multiple people
- Jimmy Cox (1882–1925), American vaudeville performer
- Jo Cox (disambiguation), multiple people
- Joanna Cox, British mariner
- Joel Cox (born 1942), American film editor
- John Cox (disambiguation), multiple people
- Johnny Cox (born 1936), American basketball player
- Jolan Cox (born 1991), Belgian volleyball player
- Jon Cox (soccer) (born 1986), American soccer player
- Jordan Cox (disambiguation), multiple people
- Joseph Cox (disambiguation), multiple people
- Josephine Cox (1938–2020), English author
- Josh Cox (born 1975), American runner
- Julian Cox (??–1663), English witch
- Julie Cox (born 1973), Scottish actress

=== K ===
- Kadeena Cox (born 1991), British athlete
- Karen L. Cox, American historian
- Karl Cox, American business executive
- Katari "Kastro" Cox (born 1976), American rapper
- Katelyn Cox (born 1998), Australian rules footballer
- Katelynne Cox (born 1994), American singer
- Katherine Laird Cox (1887–1938), British socialist
- Kathleen Cox (1904–1972), Irish artist
- Kathy Cox (disambiguation), multiple people
- Keith Cox (1933–1998), British geologist
- Keith Cox (cricketer) (1903–1977), New Zealand cricketer
- Kennard Cox (born 1985), American football player
- Kenneth Cox (1928–2026), American politician
- Kenneth A. Cox (1916–2011), American attorney
- Kenny Cox (1940–2008), American pianist
- Kenny Ray Cox (born 1957), American politician
- Kenyon Cox (1856–1919), American artist
- Kerrianne Cox, Australian singer
- Kevin R. Cox (born 1939), British-American geographer
- Kirk Cox (born 1957), American politician
- Kris Cox (born 1973), American golfer
- Kristen Cox (born 1969), American politician
- Kristy Cox, Australian singer-songwriter
- Kurt Cox (1947–2018), American golfer

=== L ===
- Lance Cox (1933–2016), Australian rules footballer
- Lara Cox (born 1978), Australian actress
- Larry Cox (disambiguation), multiple people
- Laura Cox (disambiguation), multiple people
- Lauren Cox (born 1998), American basketball player
- Lauren Cox (swimmer) (born 2001), English swimmer
- Laurence Cox (disambiguation), multiple people
- Laurie D. Cox (1883–1968), American landscape architect
- Laverne Cox (born 1972), American actress
- LaWanda Cox (1909–2005), American historian
- Leander Cox (1812–1865), American politician
- Lee Cox (disambiguation), multiple people
- Leonard Cox (1495–1549), English author
- Leonard Bell Cox (1894–1976), Australian neurologist
- Leroy M. Cox (1906–1981), American entrepreneur
- Les Cox (1904–1934), American baseball player
- Leslie Reginald Cox (1897–1965), British malacologist
- Linda Cox (1946–2008), American politician from Florida
- Lionel Cox (disambiguation), multiple people
- Lois Cox, New Zealand writer
- Louis Cox (1874–1961), American judge
- Louise Cox (disambiguation), multiple people
- Lucy Cox (artist) (born 1988), British artist
- Lynne Cox (born 1957), American swimmer
- Lynne Cox (scientist), British chemist

=== M ===
- Maarten Cox (born 1985), Belgian singer
- Madison Cox (born 1995), Puerto Rican footballer
- Madisyn Cox (born 1995), American swimmer
- Margaret Cox (disambiguation), multiple people
- Margie Cox, American singer
- Marian Roalfe Cox (1860–1916), English folklorist
- Marie C. Cox (1920–2005), American activist
- Marion Cox (1920–1996), NASCAR owner
- Mark Cox (disambiguation), multiple people
- Marques Cox (born 1999), American football player
- Marsha Cox (born 1983), South African field hockey player
- Marta Cox (born 1997), Panamanian footballer
- Martin Cox (born 1956), American football player
- Martyn Cox, English politician
- Marvyn Cox (born 1964), English speedway rider
- Mason Cox (born 1991), American Australian rules footballer
- Matthew Cox (disambiguation), multiple people
- Maurice Cox (born 1959), English footballer
- Meghan Cox (born 1994), American soccer player
- Mekia Cox (born 1981), American actress
- Mia Cox, American singer-songwriter
- Michael Cox (disambiguation), multiple people
- Michele Cox (born 1968), New Zealand footballer
- Michelle Cox (born 1991), Australian softball player
- Mike Cox (disambiguation), multiple people
- Minnie M. Cox (1869–1933), American teacher
- Mitchell Cox (disambiguation), multiple people
- Modie Cox (born 1972), American basketball player
- Molly Cox (1925–1991), British television producer
- Monica Cox, American professor
- Montana Cox (born 1993), Australian model
- Morgan Cox (born 1986), American football player

=== N ===
- Nagin Cox (born 1965), Indian aeronautical engineer
- Nancy Cox (disambiguation), multiple people
- Nathalie Cox (born 1978), British actress
- Nathan Cox (born 1971), American music video director
- Neil Cox (born 1971), English footballer
- Newman Cox (1867–1938), Guyanese cricketer
- Nicholas Cox (disambiguation), multiple people
- Nico Cox, American horologist
- Nigel Cox (disambiguation), multiple people
- Nikki Cox (born 1978), American actress
- Noel Cox (born 1965), New Zealand lawyer
- Noel Cox (politician) (1911–1985), American politician
- Norman Cox (disambiguation), multiple people

=== O ===
- Oliver Cox (1901–1974), Trinidadian-American sociologist
- Oscar Cox (1880–1931), Brazilian sportsman
- Oscar Cox (lawyer) (1905–1966), American lawyer and judge
- Owen Cox (1866–1932), Welsh-Australian businessman
- Owen DeVol Cox (1910–1990), American judge

=== P ===
- Paige Cox (1855–1934), British archdeacon
- Palmer Cox (1840–1924), Canadian inventor
- Pam Cox, English politician
- Pat Cox (born 1952), Irish politician
- Patrick Cox (born 1963), Canadian-British fashion designer
- Patrick L. Cox, American historian
- Paul Cox (disambiguation), multiple people
- Paula Cox (born 1964), Bermudian politician
- Percy Cox (1864–1937), British diplomat
- Percy Cox (cricketer) (1878–1918), Barbadian cricketer
- Percy S. Cox (1872–1911), American photographer
- Perrish Cox (born 1987), American football player
- Perry D. Cox (born 1957), American memorabilia expert
- Peter Cox (disambiguation), multiple people
- Phil Cox (born 1974), American political operative
- Phillip Cox (disambiguation), multiple people
- Pierre Cox (born 1956), French astronomer

=== R ===
- Rachael Cox (born 1975), Australian Paralympic sailor
- Rachel Cox (disambiguation), multiple people
- Rakim Cox (born 1991), American football player
- Ralph Cox (born 1957), American ice hockey player
- Ramsay Cox (1911–2005), English cricketer
- Raphael Cox (born 1986), American soccer player
- Rawle Cox (born 1960), American field hockey player
- Ray Cox (disambiguation), multiple people
- Raymond Cox (1951–2017), American businessman and politician
- Reavis Cox (1900–1992), American academic
- Rebecca Cox (disambiguation), multiple people
- Red Cox (1895–1984), American baseball player
- Reginald Cox (1865–1922), English banker
- Renard Cox (born 1978), American football player
- Renee Cox (born 1960), American artist
- Richard Cox (disambiguation), multiple people
- Rita Cox (born 1929/1930), Canadian storyteller
- Robert Cox (disambiguation), multiple people
- Roderick Cox (disambiguation), multiple people
- Roger Cox (born 1947), English cricketer
- Rohanee Cox (born 1980), Australian basketball player
- Rónadh Cox (born 1962), Irish geologist
- Ronald Cox (disambiguation), multiple people
- Roosevelt Cox (1914–???), American baseball player
- Rory Cox (born 1991), English cricketer
- Roxbee Cox, Lord Kings Norton (1902–1997), British aeronautical engineer
- Rupert Cox (born 1967), English cricketer
- Russell Cox (disambiguation), multiple people
- Ryan Cox (1979–2007), South African cyclist

=== S ===
- Sabian Cox (born 1991), Trinidadian sprinter
- Sammy Cox (1924–2015), Scottish footballer
- Samuel Cox (disambiguation), multiple people
- Sara Cox (disambiguation), multiple people
- Sarah Cox, British civil servant
- Schaeffer Cox (born 1984), American political activist and felon
- Scott William Cox (born 1963), American serial killer
- Sean Cox (born 1957), American judge
- Sean Cox (rugby union) (born 1985), English rugby union footballer
- Shana Cox (born 1985), American track and field athlete
- Shannon Cox (born 1986), Australian rules footballer
- Shannon Cox (rower) (born 1998), New Zealand rower
- Shawn Cox (born 1974), Barbadian boxer
- Shelly-Ann Cox (1988–2026), Barbadian scientist and civil servant
- Sheree Cox (born 1990), British sports shooter
- Sidney E. Cox (1887–1975), English-Canadian religious figure
- Simon Cox (disambiguation), multiple people
- Somers Cox (1911–1997), New Zealand rower
- Sonia Cox (1936–2001), New Zealand tennis and badminton player
- Sonny Cox (disambiguation), multiple people
- Sophie Cox (born 1981), British judoka
- Spencer Cox (born 1975), American politician
- Spencer Cox (activist) (1968–2012), American activist
- Stanley Cox (disambiguation), multiple people
- Stephen Cox (disambiguation), multiple people
- Stephanie Cox (born 1986), American soccer player
- Steve Cox (disambiguation), multiple people
- Susan Cox (disambiguation), multiple people
- Susanna Cox (1785–1809), American domestic servant
- Suzanne Cox (born 1972), English aerobic instructor
- Sydney Cox (1905–1969), English cricketer

=== T ===
- Tara Cox (born 1971), New Zealand footballer
- Ted Cox (disambiguation), multiple people
- TJ Cox (born 1963), American engineer and politician
- Cochise (rapper) (born 1999), American rapper
- Terry Cox (1937–2026), English drummer
- Terry Cox (baseball) (born 1949), American baseball player
- Theodolphus Cox (1855–1908), New Zealand cricketer
- Thomas Cox (disambiguation), multiple people
- Tiequon Cox (born 1965), American murderer
- Tim Cox, American TV director
- Timothy Cox (baseball) (born 1986), Australian baseball player
- Tomás Cox (born 1950), Chilean journalist
- Tony Cox (disambiguation), multiple people
- Torrie Cox (born 1980), American football player
- Trena Cox (1895–1980), English artist
- Trenchard Cox (1905–1995), British museum director
- Trevor Cox, English academic
- Trevor Cox (ice hockey) (born 1995), Canadian ice hockey player
- Tricia Nixon Cox (born 1946), American daughter of Richard Nixon

=== U ===
- Ulysses Orange Cox (1864–1920) American biologist and educator

=== V ===
- Vaughan Cox (1860–1923), British general
- Vincent Cox III, American politician
- Virgil J. Cox (1904–1991), American politician
- Vivienne Cox (born 1959), British businesswoman
- V. L. Cox (born 1962), American artist

=== W ===
- Wally Cox (1924–1973), American actor
- Walter Cox (disambiguation), multiple people
- Warren J. Cox (born 1935), American architect
- Wendell Cox, American public policy consultant
- Wesley Cox (1955–2024), American basketball player
- West Cox (born 1986), American politician
- W. F. Cox, American football player
- W. H. Lionel Cox (1844–1921), British lawyer and judge
- Wiffy Cox (1896–1969), American golfer
- William Cox (disambiguation), multiple people

=== Z ===
- Zack Cox (born 1989), American baseball player

== Fictional characters ==
- Julianna Cox, fictional character from Homicide: Life on the Street
- Perry Cox, fictional character on the TV series Scrubs
- Reg Cox, fictional character in East Enders soap opera
- Rodney Cox, man supposedly executed by Thomas Jefferson for treason

== See also ==
- Cock, Cocke, Cocks, Cockx
- Cox, Coxe, Coxen, Coxon, Coxson
- Kox
- General Cox (disambiguation), a disambiguation page with Generals surnamed Cox
- Governor Cox (disambiguation), a disambiguation page with Governors surnamed Cox
- Justice Cox (disambiguation), a disambiguation page with Justices surnamed Cox
- Senator Cox (disambiguation), a disambiguation page with Senators surnamed Cox

== Sources ==
- Cottle, Basil. Penguin Dictionary of Surnames. Baltimore: Penguin Books, 1967.
- Hanks, Patrick. Dictionary of American Family Names. Oxford University Press, 2003.
- Hanks, Patrick and Flavia Hodges. A Dictionary of Surnames. Oxford University Press, 1989.
- Smith, Elsdon C. American Surnames. Genealogical Publishing Company, 1997.
