= Cocke =

Cocke (/ˈkɑks/)is a surname (pronounced cock, cox or coke) and may refer to:

- Charles Lewis Cocke (born 1940), Professor of Physics at Kansas State University, winner of 2006 Davisson–Germer Prize in Atomic or Surface Physics
- Erle Cocke Jr. (1921–2000), International banking consultant and lobbyist
- James Cocke, mayor of Williamsburg, Virginia in the eighteenth century
- James Richard Cocke (1863–1900), American physician, homeopath, and a pioneer hypnotherapist
- John Cocke (1925–2002), American computer scientist
- John Alexander Cocke (1772–1854), American politician who represented Tennessee
- John Hartwell Cocke (1780–1866), American planter and brigadier general in the War of 1812
- Martha Louisa Cocke (1855–1938), American college president
- Philip St. George Cocke (1809–1861), Confederate general during the American Civil War
- William Cocke (1748–1828), one of the first U.S. senators from Tennessee
- W. A. Cocke (1796–1844), third mayor of Louisville, Kentucky
- William Michael Cocke (1815–1896), grandson of William Cocke who also represented Tennessee
- Zitella Cocke (1840–1929), American poet

== See also ==
- Cooke
- Coke (disambiguation)
- John Cocke (disambiguation)
- Cocke County, Tennessee
- Cock, Cocke, Cocks, Cockx
- Cox, Coxe, Coxen, Coxon, Coxson
- Kox
