= Coxson =

Coxson is an English surname. Notable people with this surname include:

- Lawrence Coxson, American tenor and member of the R&B group The Swallows
- Major Coxson (1930–1973), American gangster and nightclub owner
- Pamela G. Coxson, American mathematician and disease modeller

== See also ==
- Cock, Cocke, Cocks, Cockx
- Cox, Coxe, Coxen, Coxon, Coxson
- Kox
