= Coxon =

- Pronunciation: /ˈkɒksən/
- Language: English

Origin
- Origin: 1. cocke + son 2. Cox + son

Other names
- Variant forms: Coxen, Cockson

Coxon is a surname. Notable people with the surname include:

- Alan Coxon (cricketer) (1930–2012), English cricketer
- Alan Coxon (born before 2006), British TV chef and presenter
- Alec Coxon (1916–2006), English cricketer
- Allan Coxon (1909–2001), English academic who specialised in classical Greek and ancient philosophy
- Chris Coxon (born 1987), British actor known for the film Sherlock Holmes
- Graham Coxon (born 1969), English musician, singer-songwriter and painter, a founding member of the band Blur
- Jacob Coxon, British AI researcher, whistleblower and former employee of OpenAI and Anthropic
- John Coxon (pirate) (active 1677–82), referred to as John Coxen in some sources
- John Coxon (born before 1993), member of English band Spring Heel Jack
- Lucinda Coxon (born 1962), English playwright and screenwriter
- Mark Coxon (born 1978), English cricketer
- Roy Coxon (born before 1952), English-born footballer who played for New Zealand
- Scott Coxon (born 1973), Australian rugby league player
- Tom Coxon (1883–1942), English footballer

== See also ==
- Cock, Cocke, Cocks, Cockx
- Cox, Coxe, Coxen, Coxon, Coxson
- Kox
- Coxsone
- Göksun, a town in Kahramanmaraş Province, Turkey sometimes Latinised as Coxon
