= Speas =

Speas is a surname. Notable people with the surname include:

- Alex Speas (born 1998), American baseball player
- Ben Speas (born 1991), American soccer player
- Bill Speas (1887–1969), American baseball player and manager
- Jan Cox Speas (1925–1971), American writer
- Nate James (born 1979), British singer-songwriter
- Peggy Speas, American linguist
