= Senator Cox =

Senator Cox may refer to:

- Charles Frederick Cox (1863–1944), Australian Senate
- Dave Cox (1938–2010), California State Senate
- Dorinda Cox (born 1976), Australian Senate
- Eugene Saint Julien Cox (1834–1898), Minnesota State Senate
- Hardin Cox (1928–2013), Missouri State Senate
- Jacob Dolson Cox (1828–1900), Ohio State Senate
- James H. Cox (Virginian) (1810–1877), Virginia State Senate
- John I. Cox (1855–1946), Tennessee State Senate
- Kenneth Cox (born 1928), Ohio State Senate
- Noel Cox (politician) (1911–1985), Missouri State Senate
- Thomas Cox (politician) (1787–1844), Illinois State Senate
- William Hopkinson Cox (1856–1950), Kentucky State Senate

== See also ==
- Eckley Brinton Coxe (1839–1895), Pennsylvania State Senate
- Tiny Kox (born 1953), Senate of the Netherlands
