= Cock (surname) =

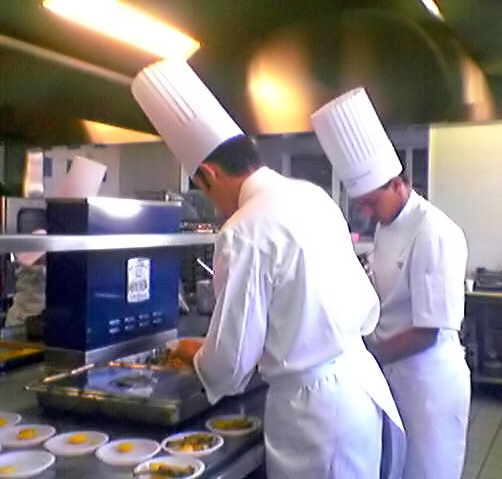
- Two chefs in the process of cooking.

Origin
- Origin: Dutch and Flemish
- Meaning: Derived from the occupation of a cook.

Other names
- Related names: de Cock, Kok, de Kok

The surname Cock is derived from the Dutch and Flemish surname de Cock, alternately found as de Cook or de Kok and can be Anglicanised as Cook, and comes from the occupation of a cook.

The name Cock is also a variant spelling of Cox, which is of Old English or Welsh origin, and developed independently of the Dutch and Flemish name.

== Notable persons ==
- Adam Gates (a.k.a. Bob C. Cock), composer, musician, Primus roadie and producer
- Christopher Cock, auctioneer of the eighteenth century
- Donald Cock (1896–1974), English footballer
- Edward Cock (1805–1892), British surgeon
- Geoffrey Hornblower Cock (1896–1980), British World War I flying ace
- Gerald Cock (1887–1973), first director of BBC television
- Herbert Cock, multiple people
- Hieronymus Cock (also Kock), Flemish Renaissance painter and engraver
- Jack Cock (1893–1966), English footballer
- James Cock (1833–1901), politician in South Australia, son of Robert
- John Cock (MP died 1557), MP for Hertfordshire and Calne
- John Cock (RAF officer) (1918–1988), Australian-born fighter pilot of World War II
- John Cok (fl. 1420), MP for Chichester
- John S. Cock (1801–1869), American politician and judge from Ohio
- Martin Cock, stage name of American Head Charge singer Cameron Heacock
- Matthys Cock, Flemish painter
- Richard Cock, South African musician
- Robert Cock (1801–1871), colonist of South Australia
- Townsend D. Cock (1838–1913), New York politician

== See also ==
- Cock, Cocke, Cocks, Cockx
- Cox, Coxe, Coxen, Coxon, Coxson
- Kox
