= Lionel Cox =

Lionel Cox may refer to:

- Lionel Cox (cyclist) (1930–2010), Australian cyclist
- Lionel Cox (sport shooter) (born 1981), Belgian sport shooter
- W. H. Lionel Cox (1844–1921), British lawyer from Mauritius and Chief Justice of the Straits Settlements
- Lionel Cox (priest) (died 1945), Archdeacon of Madras
- Lionel Howard Cox (1893–1949), British Army officer
