= Dorothy Cox =

Dorothy Cox may refer to:

- Dorothy Cox (archaeologist)
- Dorothy Cox (artist) (1882–1947)
- Diana Wynyard (1906–1964), born Dorothy Isobel Cox, English stage and film actress
