= Gary Cox =

Gary Cox may refer to:

- Gary Cox (Gaelic footballer)
- Gary Cox (philosopher) (born 1964), British philosopher and author
- Gary Cox (musician) (died 2012), American guitarist and vocalist
- Gary W. Cox (born 1955), American political scientist
