= Anthony Cox =

Anthony Cox or Tony Cox may refer to:

- Anthony Cox (musician) (born 1954), American jazz bassist
- Anthony D. Cox (born 1937), American film producer and art promoter formerly married to Yoko Ono
- Anthony Cox (sprinter) (born 2000), Jamaican sprinter
- Anthony Berkeley Cox (1893–1971), English crime writer
- Anthony J. Cox (1890–1972), American politician, member of the Mississippi State Senate
- Tony Cox (actor) (born 1958), American actor
- Tony Cox (journalist), American radio and television journalist
- Tony Cox (record producer), British record producer, arranger, orchestrator, composer
- Tony Cox (South African musician) (born 1954), Zimbabwean guitarist

== See also ==
- Cox (surname)
