= Geoffrey Cox =

Geoff(rey) or Jeff(rey) Cox may refer to:

== Sports ==
- Jeff Cox (born 1955), American baseball coach
- Geoff Cox (footballer) (1934–2014), English football winger

== Others ==
- Geoffrey Cox (journalist) (1910–2008), New Zealand-born British journalist and diplomat
- Geoffrey Cox (Australian politician) (1914–1964), Liberal legislator
- Geoff Cox (born 1951), Australian musician and media personality
- Jeff Cox (judge) (born 1962), Louisiana judge
- Jeffrey A. Cox, North Carolina community college president
- Jeffrey N. Cox (born 1954), American academic
- Geoffrey Cox (British politician) (born 1960), barrister and Member of Parliament
- Jeffrey Cox (born 1971), American lawyer and military historian, involved in 2011 Wisconsin protests
- Jeffrey David Cox (born 1951), American union leader

== See also ==
- Cox (surname)
