= Laura Cox =

Laura Cox may refer to:

- Laura Cox (judge) (born 1951), English High Court judge
- Laura Cox (musician) (born 1990), Anglo-French musician
- Laura Cox (politician) (born 1964), American politician

== See also ==
- Lauren Cox (born 1998), American basketball player
- Laurie D. Cox (1883–1968), American landscape architect
