= Judge Cox =

Judge Cox may refer to:

- Elijah Allen Cox (1887–1974), judge of the United States District Court for the Northern District of Mississippi
- Emmett Ripley Cox (1935–2021), judge of the United States Court of Appeals for the Eleventh Circuit
- Owen DeVol Cox (1910–1990), judge of the United States District Court for the Southern District of Texas
- Sean Cox (born 1957), judge of the United States District Court for the Eastern District of Michigan
- Walter T. Cox III (born 1942), judge of the United States Court of Appeals for the Armed Forces
- William Harold Cox (1901–1988), judge of the United States District Court for the Southern District of Mississippi

== See also ==
- Justice Cox (disambiguation)
- Alfred Conkling Coxe Jr. (1880–1957), judge of the United States District Court for the Southern District of New York
- Alfred Conkling Coxe Sr. (1847–1923), judge of the United States Court of Appeals for the Second Circuit
