= Justice Cox =

Justice Cox may refer to:

- Charles E. Cox (1860–1936), associate justice and chief justice of the Indiana Supreme Court
- Frank Cox (judge) (1862–1940), associate justice of the Supreme Court of Appeals of West Virginia
- Joseph Winston Cox (1875–1939), associate justice of the District Court of the United States for the District of Columbia
- Louis Cox (1874–1961), associate justice of the Massachusetts Supreme Judicial Court
- W. H. Lionel Cox (1844–1921), chief justice of the Straits Settlements
- Walter Smith Cox (1826–1902), associate justice of the Supreme Court of the District of Columbia

== See also ==
- Judge Cox (disambiguation)
