= Brad Cox (disambiguation) =

Brad Cox (1944–2021) was an American computer scientist.

Brad Cox may also refer to:

- Brad Cox (musician), Australian country singer-songwriter
- Brad Cox (physicist), American physicist
- Brad Cox (ice hockey), Canadian ice hockey player
- Brad H. Cox (born 1980), American racehorse trainer

== See also ==
- Bradford Cox, American singer-songwriter and musician
