= General Cox =

General Cox may refer to:

- Albert Lyman Cox (1883–1965), U.S. Army major general
- Charles Frederick Cox (1863–1944), Australian Army major general
- Edgar William Cox (1882–1918), British Army brigadier general
- Jacob Dolson Cox (1828–1900), Union Army major general
- John V. Cox (born 1930), U.S. Marine Corps major general
- Lionel Howard Cox (1893–1949), British Army major general
- Percy Cox (1864–1937), British Indian Army major general
- Samuel D. Cox (born 1961), U.S. Air Force lieutenant general
- Vaughan Cox (1860–1923), British Army general
- William Ruffin Cox (1831/1832–1919), Confederate States Army brigadier general
