= Frank Cox =

Frank Cox may refer to:

- Frank Cox (architect) (1854–1940), American artist and theatre architect
- Frank Cox (baseball) (1857–1928), played in 1884 Detroit Wolverines season
- Frank Cox (businessman) (fl. c. 1900), leader of several coal companies
- Frank Cox (director) (1940–2021), British film director
- Frank Cox (musician), played with Heart and the Lovemongers
- Frank Cox (judge) (1862–1940), justice of the Supreme Court of Appeals of West Virginia
- Frank Woodard Cox, superintendent of Virginia Beach City Public Schools, 1933–1968
- Frank Cox of The Cox Twins (1920–2007)

== See also ==
- Elbert Frank Cox (1895–1969), American mathematician
- Francis Cox (disambiguation)
- Franklin Cox (born 1961), American composer and instrumentalist
- USAT General Frank M. Coxe, US Army ferry servicing San Francisco Bay area 1922–1947
