= Susan Cox =

Susan Cox may refer to:

- Susan Cox (diplomat), Australian diplomat
- Susan Cox (nurse) (1827–1901), Union nurse during the American Civil War
- Susan Cox (artist) (born 1952), American painter
