= Mitchell Cox =

Mitchell Cox may refer to:

- Mitchell Cox (rugby, born 1958), Australian rugby league and rugby union footballer
- Mitchell Cox (rugby league, born 1993), English professional rugby league footballer
