= Jan Cox =

Jan Cox may refer to:

- Jan Cox (painter) (1919–1980), Dutch painter
- Jan Cox Speas (1925–1971), American short story writer and novelist

== See also ==
- Jan Cockx (1891–1976), Belgian painter
- Jan Cock Blomhoff (1779–1853), Dutch director of a trading company
