= Sydney Cox =

English cricketer (1905–1969)

Sydney Cox (23 May 1905 – 5 March 1969) was an English cricketer who played for Northamptonshire. He appeared in six first-class matches in 1932 as a righthanded batsman who bowled right-arm medium pace. Cox was born in Northampton on 23 May 1905 and died there on 5 March 1969. He scored 89 runs with a highest score of 25 and took one wicket with a best performance of one for 10.
