= Barbara Cox =

Barbara Cox may refer to:

- Barbara Cox (writer), British television writer and script editor
- Barbara Cox (footballer) (born 1947), New Zealand international women's football (soccer) player
- Barbara Cox Anthony (1922–2007), media owner, daughter of James M. Cox
