= Edwin Cox =

Edwin Cox may refer to:

- Edwin L. Cox (1921–2020), American businessman and philanthropist
- Edwin P. Cox (1870–1938), American politician in the Virginia House of Delegates
  - Edwin Cox (chemist) (1902–1977), his son, a chemist, civic leader, and military officer
- Edwin Charles Cox (1868–1958), British soldier and railway manager
- Edwin Cox (footballer) (1886–1975), Brazilian football player
- Edwin Thoms Cox (1881–1967), mayor of Dunedin
