= Roderick Cox =

Roderick Cox may refer to:

- Roderick Cox (conductor), African American conductor
- Roderick H. Cox (1911–2000), American athlete, educator and environmentalist
