= Norman Cox =

Norman or Norm Cox may refer to:

- Norm Cox (gridiron football) (1925–2008), American football player
- Norm Cox (designer) (born 1951), American designer
- Norman Cox (rugby union) (1877–1930), English rugby union player
- Norman Kershaw Cox (1869–1949), New Zealand dentist
