= Susan Cox (artist) =

American painter

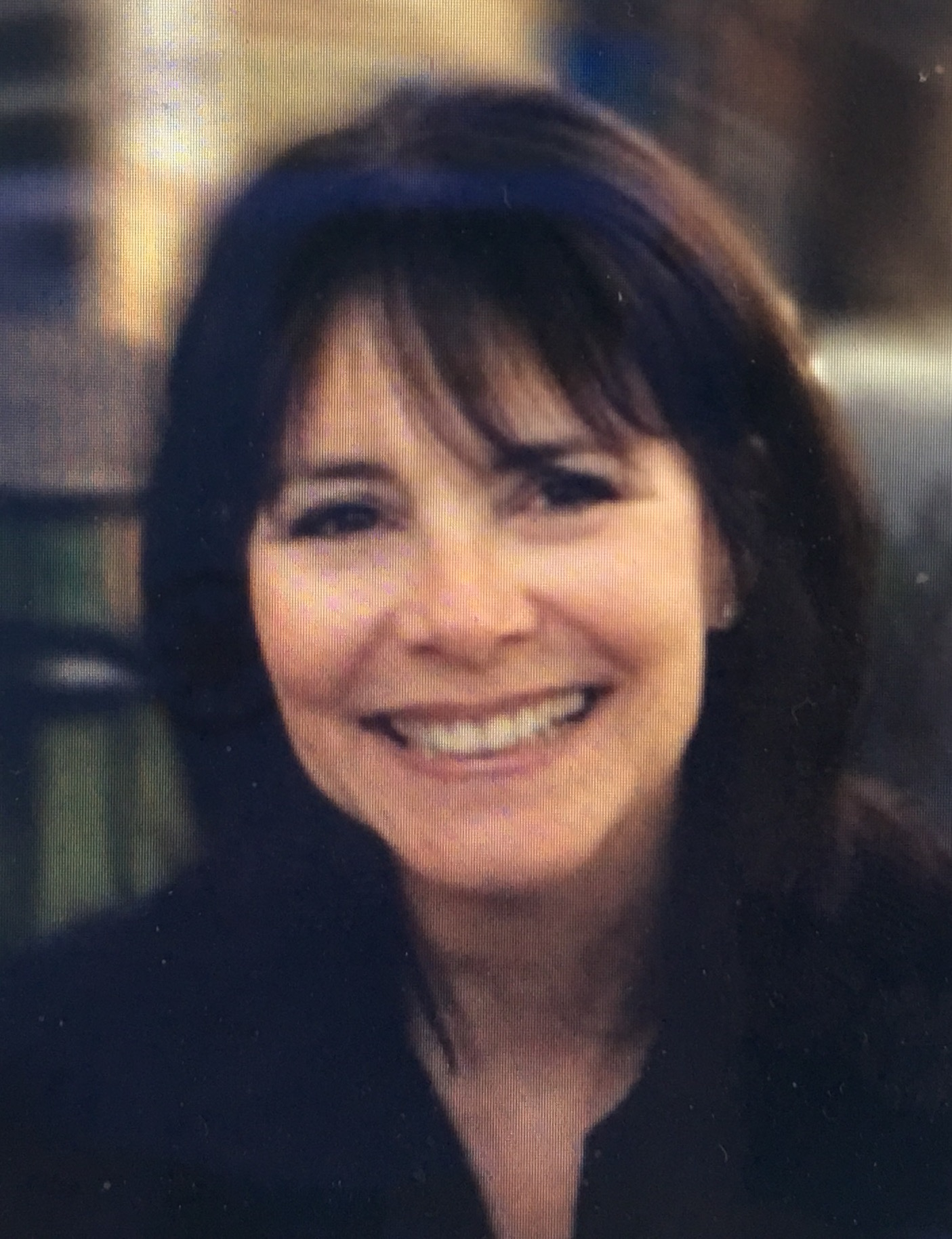
Fine Artist Painter Susan Cox

Susan Cox (born 1952) is an American painter. She is completed work in oil, acrylic, and watercolor mediums. Her work focuses on City Scenes and life and Landscapes en plein air. Her work has been showcased across Europe and the United States.

== Education and Teaching ==
Susan Cox received a Bachelors of Arts Degree in Fine Arts and Ceramics from California State University Long Beach.

During her time as an emerging artist, Cox worked as an art gallery sales consultant, interior design apprentice, and floral designer. Cox has also served as a juror for the Festival of the Arts in Laguna Beach in 1999 & 2006.

Cox's art focuses on oil mediums and plein-air painting. In Winter 2009, Cox was a professor of plein-air painting at the Oceanside Museum of Arts. Her course was titled "A Breath of Fresh Air". In this course, she lectured on the fundamentals of plein-air painting, included an introduction to the genre, and its history. Students and Cox also spent time going out on location to paint.

== Life and work ==
After moving to England with her family, she painted and exhibited her work in the London and Oxfordshire areas for 14 years. Her work was included in the 1996 Federation of British Artists "Britain in Watercolours" exhibition at the Mall Galleries in London.

Cox's work has been published and featured in various national and regional publications. Orange Coast Magazine has featured Cox multiple times over the years including in the July 2010, September 2004, and September 2016 issues.

In addition, ABC Wide World of Sports featured one of Cox's sports illustrations in an opening segment. Her work has been showcased in multiple California galleries and museums. Cox was twice awarded Honorable Mention in the San Clemente Plein-Air event. In addition, she currently serves Youth Committee chairman for the San Clemente Art Association.

Several hotels and country clubs in California, Nevada, and Pennsylvania have commissioned her work: Hyatt Hotel, Huntington Beach, CA, Silverstone Golf Resort, Las Vegas, NV, Blackhawk Golf Resort, Danville, CA, the Chart House Restaurant, Newport Beach, CA and the Tattersall Country Club, PA.

== Exhibitions and Featured Work ==
Cox's work has been featured in a variety of solo and collaborative exhibitions and is featured at many art shows and galleries. Below is the list of her previous and current exhibitions.

- Britain in Watercolours Exhibition, Mall Galleries, London, UK 1996
- Newport Beach Concours de Elegance, Newport Beach, CA 1998-2000
- Art of the Automobile, Muckenthaler Cultural Center, Fullerton, CA 1998-2000
- Laguna Beach Festival of Arts Pageant of the Masters 1996–present
- Sawdust Art Festival 1998-2000
- Laguna Niguel Art Association Show 1996
- National Acrylic Painter's Assoc. Show 1997
- Peterson Automotive Museum 2000
- Solo Exhibition, Sausalito Art Collection, Dana Point, CA 1999
- Solo Exhibition, Laguna Beach Art Museum show, St. Regis Resort, Monarch Beach, CA 2005
- Affair in the Gardens Show, Beverly Hills, CA 2005, 2007, 2011
- Tell Us a Story show, Segil Fine Arts Gallery, Monrovia, CA 2010
- Solo Exhibition, City Scenes, City Life, Casa Romantica Cultural Center, San Clemente, CA, 2014
- Urban Beauty show Randy Higbee Gallery, Costa Mesa, CA 2014
- 6x6 show Randy Higbee Gallery, Costa Mesa, CA 2014
