= Donald Cox =

Donald or Don Cox may refer to:

- Donald L. Cox (1936–2011), American political organizer and member of the Black Panther Party
- Donald Cox (engineer) (born 1937), American electrical engineer
- Don Cox (politician) (1939–2025), American politician
- Don Cox (singer) (born 1964), American country singer
