= Larry Cox =

Larry Cox may refer to:

- Larry Cox (baseball) (1947–1990), formerly an American Major League Baseball catcher and coach
- Larry Cox (Amnesty International) (born 1945), executive director of Amnesty International
- Larry Cox (American football) (born 1943), American football player
- Larry Cox, Ohio police officer murdered by John Parsons (criminal)

== See also ==
- Laurence Cox, MP
