= Susanna Cox =

American murderer

Susanna Cox (c. 1785–1809) was a young domestic servant in Berks County, Pennsylvania who was convicted of murdering her illegitimate infant son on April 7, 1809. She was executed in Reading, Pennsylvania on June 10, 1809.

== History ==
On the morning of February 17, 1809, the employer of Susanna Cox found the body of her baby in a rubbish bin behind his property. Cox was immediately questioned, and while she admitted that the baby was hers, she insisted that it was stillborn. After a short investigation, she was convicted of first degree murder and sentenced to death on April 7, 1809. Her court-appointed lawyers did little to defend her and no witnesses were called to testify on her behalf. Following her conviction, her case was taken up by Muehlenberg, a wealthy lawyer in Reading, and her case was taken to the Governor in hopes the conviction could be reversed. The law in Pennsylvania at the time allowed for no recourse after a conviction. After a short imprisonment in the local sheriff's home, Cox was executed in Reading on June 10, 1809. The case is credited with the later adoption of an appeals process in the state.

After receiving her death warrant, Cox had broken down and confessed that she had indeed murdered her newborn son. Her spiritual advisor, Reverend Philip Reinhold Pauli, said she was "extremely penitent, and submissive in an extraordinary degree to her impending fate."

Berks County was home to large populations of German-language immigrants who settled there in the eighteenth and early nineteenth centuries. Baptised in the Lutheran church as Susanna Gax, Cox shared this German heritage (referred to as Pennsylvania German or Pennsylvania Dutch). Cox was an uneducated woman who spoke a German dialect and could do little to defend herself in court. She had worked for the family of Jacob Geehr for eleven years, having been born into a poor family with few resources to educate or care for her. Little is known about her life before she came to work for the Geehrs, as she could not read or write and spent most of her time caring for the Geehrs' children.

Cox was made pregnant by a married neighbor of the Geehrs. While Cox insisted through the investigation and trial that the baby had been stillborn, a medical examination of the body the day it was found saw the baby's jaw broken and fabric stuffed down its throat. Cox would become the 8th woman in Pennsylvania since the state's founding to be executed for the crime of killing her illegitimate child.

Following her execution, her story gained such notoriety that it was written in a ballad and widely circulated in German and in English through newspapers and broadsides. This immensely popular ballad was printed in over 88 editions in its broadside form throughout the nineteenth and twentieth centuries. Up until 2022, the ballad was read at the annual summer Kutztown Folk Festival and Susanna Cox was hanged in effigy from a gallows created for this purpose.

== Musical adaptation ==
In the 21st century, there have been several musical adaptations of the topic, including the following works:

- Brintzenhoff, Keith: "Ballad of Susanna Cox" (Keith Brintzenhoff with Mitch Miller, Mike Hertzog & Karlene Brintzenhoff)
- Those Galloping Hordes: "Things I grew up with" an album dedicated to the life and execution of Susanna Cox by a Pennsylvanian indie band (Members unknown), 2012
- Werner, Michael: "Die Gschicht vun die Susanna Gax" (Michael Werner & The New Paltz Band), 2014

== General references ==
- Suter, Patricia, with Russell and Corinne Earnest, The Hanging of Susanna Cox: The True Story of Pennsylvania's Most Notorious Infanticide and the Legend That's Kept It Alive (Mechanicsburg, Pa.: Stackpole Books) 2010
- Nest, Bathsheba Doran, a fictional play based on the story of Susanna Cox, Samuel French Publisher, 2008.
- Earnest, Russell and Corinne, Flying-Leaves and One-Sheets: Pennsylvania German Broadsides, Fraktur, and Their Printers (New Castle, Dela.: Oak Knoll Books, 2005).
- Yoder, Don, The Pennsylvania German Broadside: A History and Guide (University Park, Pa.: Pennsylvania State University Press, 2005).
- Richards, Louis, "Susanna Cox: Her Crime and its Expiation," Paper read before the Historical Society of Berks County, Pa., 13 March 1900.
