= Laura Cox (musician) =

French musician

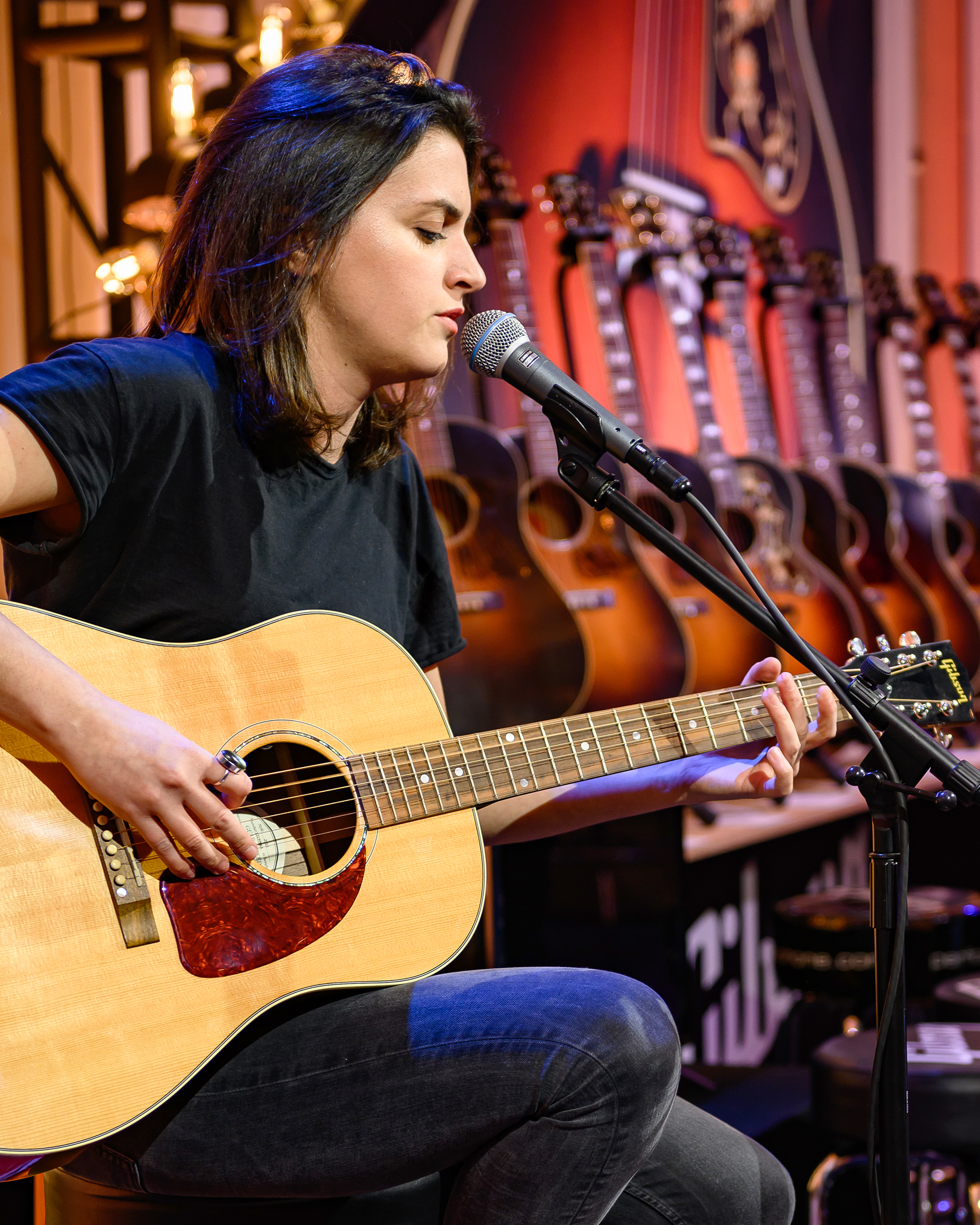
- Cox performing in 2020

Background information
- Born: 24 November 1990 (age 35); France
- Genres: Hard rock; blues rock; French rock; Southern rock
- Occupations: Musician; songwriter
- Instruments: Guitar; vocals
- Labels: Verycords; Les Trois 8; earMUSIC
- Website: lauracoxmusic.com

YouTube information
- Channel: Laura Cox
- Years active: 2006–present
- Genres: Music; vlogs
- Subscribers: 507 thousand
- Views: 115 million
- Last updated: 9 July 2024

Laura Cox (born 24 November 1990) is a French guitarist, singer and songwriter. Since 2006, she has achieved international recognition on YouTube, as a guitarist. She is also the singer and lead guitarist of the Laura Cox Band, a rock band that she formed in 2013.

== Early life ==
Laura Cox was born in France on 24 November 1990. Her mother is French and her father is English. She first picked up the guitar at the age of 14, in 2005, as a left-hander who plays right-handed, using a cheap classical guitar that her aunt gave her. Her first electric guitar was a Squier Showmaster. As a student, she initially studied architecture, before deciding upon a sound engineering course.

== Career ==
Her YouTube channel, started in 2006, was among the first of its kind to build a large audience. She spent the first eight years playing instrumental classic rock cover versions at home. She first started posting her cover versions and guitar solos on YouTube in 2008. She eventually chose to upload her own songs, complete with guitar and vocals. Until she was able to become a professional musician, she worked in a recording studio and a guitar shop. Following her success with YouTube, she became the singer and lead guitarist of the Laura Cox Band; a rock band that she formed in 2013 in the Paris region. At this point, her YouTube channel had gained several million views, and she had her first experience of playing live onstage.

== Equipment ==
Laura Cox uses Gibson Les Paul and Bacchus guitars, Orange amplifiers and Ernie Ball strings, and has also used Gibson Firebird, Fender Telecaster, Fender Stratocaster and Epiphone Les Paul guitars.

== Discography ==
=== Laura Cox Band ===
Album

- Hard Blues Shot (2017), recorded and mixed by Joseph Noia at Midi Live Studio (France)

=== Laura Cox ===
Albums

- Burning Bright (2019)
- Head Above Water (2023)
- Trouble Coming (2025)

Singles

- "Bad Luck Blues" (2019)
- "Fire Fire" (2019)
- "One Big Mess" (2023)
- "No Need to Try Harder" (2024)
