= Keith Cox (cricketer) =

New Zealand cricketer (1903–1977)

Personal information
- Full name: Keith Fortnam Sandford Cox
- Born: 30 August 1903; Marton, Rangitikei, New Zealand
- Died: 8 November 1977 (aged 74); Taupō, Waikato, New Zealand

Domestic team information
- Years: Team
- 1933/34: Otago
- Source: ESPNcricinfo, 7 May 2016

Keith Fortnam Sandford Cox (30 August 1903 – 8 November 1977) was a New Zealand cricketer. He played one first-class match for Otago in the 1933–34 season.

Cox was born at Marton in 1903 and was educated at Christ's College, Christchurch. He worked for agricultural auctioneers Wright Stephenson in Invercargill and Dunedin for 12 years before qualifying as an accountant and working for J. K. Mooney in Dunedin in the years leading up to World War II. During the war he served in 26 infantry battalion, part of the 2nd New Zealand Expeditionary Force. (Note: Auckland Museum's Online Cenotaph records give the name Keneth Fortnum Sandford Cox. This is clearly in error.) He served on the battalion's staff and was mentioned in dispatches during the Italian campaign. After the war he joined Canterbury Frozen Meat, initially as an accountant before being appointed as company secretary in 1949. He worked as the company's General Manager from 1968 and was a director between 1970 and his retirement in 1973.

Cox played representative cricket for Southland and for Otago. His only first-class match was a December 1933 fixture against Auckland at Eden Park. He scored 14 runs in the match, eight in the Otago first innings and six in the second. He died at Taupō in 1977 aged 74. (Note: A contemporary obituary gives Cox's age on his death as 60.)
