= Reavis Cox =

Reavis Cox (1900–1992) was an American academic and writer.

== Biography ==
Born in Mexico to American missionary parents, Cox obtained a bachelor's degree from the University of Texas and a doctorate in economics from Columbia University in 1932.

Cox joined the faculty of the Wharton School at the University of Pennsylvania in 1935 and remained there until his retirement in 1971 as the Sebastian S. Kresge Professor of Marketing.

Cox co-developed methods to study the flow of ownership of goods from raw materials to consumers, evaluating the efficiency, cost, and value added at each stage of distribution. Cox served as managing editor and editor-in-chief of both The American Marketing Journal and The Journal of Marketing.

== Bibliography ==
- Theory in Marketing
- The Economics of Instalment Buying
