= Albert Cox =

Albert Cox may refer to:

- Albert Cox (footballer) (1917–2003), English footballer
- Albert Prince-Cox (1890–1967), footballer and boxer
- Abbie Cox (Albert Edward Cox, 1902–1985), ice hockey player
- Albert Lyman Cox (1883–1965), attorney, state legislator, state judge, and U.S. Army general

== See also ==
- Alfred Conkling Coxe Sr., American judge
- Alfred Conkling Coxe Jr., American judge
