= Paul Cox =

Paul Cox may refer to:

- Paul Alan Cox, American ethnobotanist
- Paul Cox (director) (1940–2016), Australian film director
- Paul Cox (footballer) (born 1972), English footballer and football manager
- Paul Cox (musician), conductor of the Reading Youth Orchestra
