= Karl Cox =

American business executive

Karl Cox is an American business executive. He is Vice President of the Oracle Corporation, responsible for Public Policy and Corporate Affairs for Europe, the Middle East and Africa.

He is also the Chair of the Board of the American Chamber of Commerce to the European Union.

He obtained a BSc in Foreign Service from Georgetown University and a postgraduate diploma from the College of Europe, which he attended 1981–1982 (Johan Willem Beyen promotion). He worked with the American Chamber of Commerce for nearly thirty years, mainly on EU activities in Brussels. He joined the Oracle Corporation in 2005.
