= Lee Cox =

Lee Cox may refer to:

- Lee Cox (athlete) (born 1981), Paralympic athlete from Australia
- Lee Cox (footballer) (born 1990), English professional footballer

== See also ==
- Ricky L. Cox (born 1958), American politician in Kentucky
