= Cocks (surname) =

Cocks is a surname. Notable people with the surname include:

- Arthur Herbert Tennyson Somers-Cocks, 6th Baron Somers (1887–1944)
- Charles Cocks, 1st Baron Somers (1725–1806)
- Charles Cocks, British 19th century wine enthusiast, author of Cocks & Féret
- Charles Somers Somers-Cocks, 3rd Earl Somers (1819–1883)
- Clifford Cocks (born 1950), British cryptographer
- Jay Cocks, film writer
- John Somers Somers-Cocks, 2nd Earl Somers (1788–1852)
- John Sommers Cocks, 1st Earl Somers (1760–1841)
- Richard Cocks (1565–1624), English trader in Japan in the seventeenth century
- Robert Cocks, see Cocks baronets
- Roger Cocks (fl. 1635), Church of England clergyman
- Seymour Cocks (1882–1953), British Labour MP

== See also ==
- Cock, Cocks, Cockx
- Cox, Coxe, Coxen, Coxon
- Kox
