= Ray Cox =

Ray Cox may refer to:

- Ray Cox (performer) (1881–1957), American actress and vaudeville performer
- Ray Cox (gamer) (born 1983), gamer known for setting Xbox Gamerscore records
- Ray Cox (died 1986), a victim of the Therac-25 malfunctions in the mid-1980s
