= Rebecca Cox =

Rebecca Cox may refer to:

- Rebecca Gernhardt Cox (born 1954), former White House staff member and airline executive
- Rebecca Cox Jackson (1795–1871), African-American free woman, writer, and religious activist
- Rebecca Brandewyne (born 1955), author; full name Mary Rebecca Wadsworth Brandewyne Cox
