= Maarten Cox =

Belgian singer (born 1985)

Maarten Cox (born 30 March 1985) is a Belgian singer who was a contestant on Idool 2004, the second season of the Belgian version of Idols, the reality television-music competition series. His audition was in October 2004. He was eliminated on 14 November 2004 finishing sixth overall. After Idool, he released his album Terugblik (meaning Retrospective), a collection of new interpretations of Dutch oldies by various artists including Tom Van Stiphout, Eric Melaerts, Vincent Pierens, Miguel Wiels. "Malle Babbe", a cover of a Rob de Nijs and Boudewijn de Groot hit was his debut single.

Cox had started at an early age as part of a children's choir "De Piccolo's". He studied music theory and later piano, vocals and playing the saxophone. After playing in Tovenaar van Oz, a Dutch version of Wizard of Oz, he formed a duo with pianist Toon Meuris called Perplex. Adding Peter Thys as drummer, he continued performing as a trio.

Starting December 2011, he joined TV Limburg as host and presenter of Studio TVL alongside Cynthia en Rudi.

He returned in 2012 with a string of charting singles in the Flemish Ultratop Top 50, the Belgian singles chart.

== Discography ==
=== Albums ===
Year	Album	Peak positions
Year	Album	Flemish Ultratop Album Top 200
2006	Terugblik	32
2017	Op weg	82

=== Singles ===
Year	Album	Peak positions		Album
Year	Album	Ultratop 50	Ultratip	Album
2005	"Malle Babbe"	30	–	Terugblik
2012	"Wat doe je dan?"	45	–	
2012	"Leve de winter"	–	3	
2013	"Onweerstaanbaar"	–	5	
2014	"Vrij"	–	5	
2014	"Leuker met twee"	38	–	
2016	"Als ze me kust"	48	–	
2017	"Ga door"	–	33	
