= Dorothy Cox (artist) =

British artist

Dorothy Cox, later Dorothy Llewellyn Lewis, (1882–1947) was a British artist, known for painting portraits in miniature and for her landscape pictures.

== Biography ==
Cox was born in Finchley in north London and is recorded as being an art student in Croydon in 1901, although by then she already had a number of works shown in public exhibitions. Her first painting was exhibited in 1899 and in 1901 she was elected a member of the Royal Miniature Society. Throughout her career Cox continued to paint miniatures and also landscapes, often in watercolours. She exhibited at a variety of venues including at the Walker Art Gallery in Liverpool. with the Society of Women Artists, and at both the Royal Academy and the Fine Art Society in London. In Scotland, works by Cox were shown at the Royal Hibernian Academy from 1916 to 1924 and also at the Royal Glasgow Institute of the Fine Arts.

In 1910 Cox married W. Llewellyn Lewis at Kensington in London and later lived at Shoreham-by-Sea in West Sussex before moving to Bournemouth. The Brighton Museum & Art Gallery holds examples of her watercolours. and a work of hers is in the collection of the Victoria and Albert Museum, London.
