= Louise Cox =

Louise Cox may refer to:

- Louise Cox (painter) (1865–1945), American painter
- Louise Cox (architect) (born 1939), Australian architect
