= Zitella Cocke =

American writer (1840–1929)

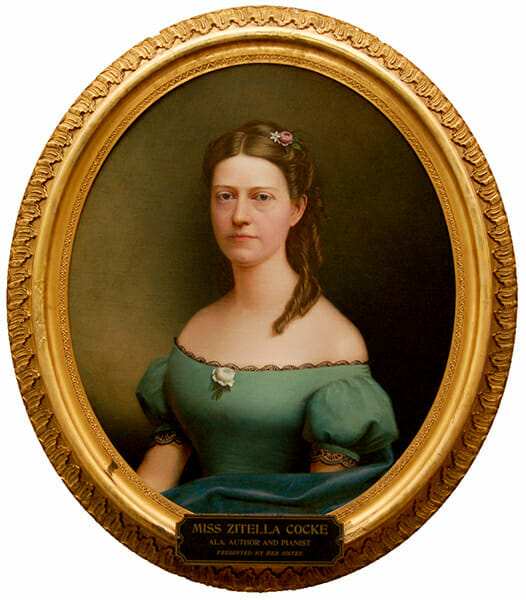
- portrait by Nicola Marschall
- Born: November 10, 1840; Marion
- Died: December 3, 1929 (aged 89); Gadsden
- Occupation: Writer, musician

Zitella Cocke (November 10, 1840 – December 3, 1929) was an American poet, essayist, and musician.

Cocke was born in Marion, Alabama, on November 10, 1840. She was the daughter of Woodson St. George Cocke, a planter from a Virginia family, and Mary Elizabeth Burton Binion Cocke, a descendant of French Huguenot refugees. Cocke primarily lived in Boston, Massachusetts.

The children's journal The Youth's Companion published Cocke's poetry, which was then reprinted by other news organizations.

Zitella Cocke died on December 3, 1929, in Gadsden, Alabama, and was buried in Marion, Alabama.

== Bibliography ==
- Cocke, Zitella (1895). A Doric reed. Half-title: Oaten stop series. Boston: Copeland and Day. LCCN 22023218.
- The Grasshoppers' Hop and Other Verses. Boston: D. Estes & co. 1901. LCCN 01011741.
- Cherokee Rose and Other Southern Poems. Boston, Massachusetts: R. G. Badger. 1907 – via UWDC – UW-Madison Librarie.
