= Gary Cox (philosopher) =

British philosopher, author (born 1964)

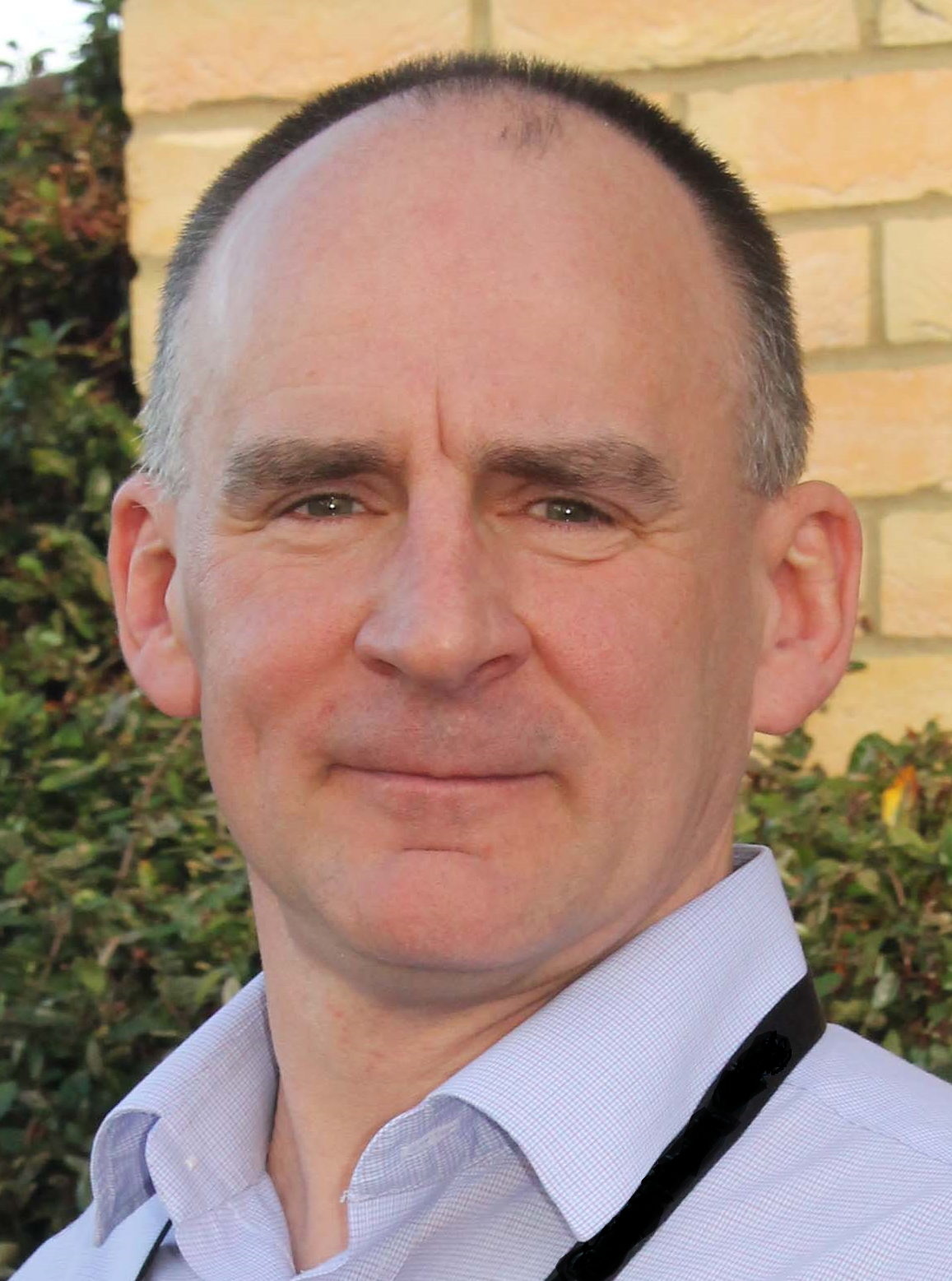
- Born: 1964 (age 61–62); England
- Education: University of Birmingham (Ph.D.)
- Occupations: Philosopher; biographer; writer

Gary Cox (born 1964, England) is a British philosopher and biographer and the author of several books on Jean-Paul Sartre, existentialism, general philosophy, ethics and philosophy of sport.

A Philosophy graduate of the University of Southampton, UK, in 1988, he was awarded his PhD in 1996 from the University of Birmingham, UK, for his thesis on Jean-Paul Sartre's theory of consciousness, freedom and bad faith and is an honorary research fellow of that same university. His most notable works to date are The Sartre Dictionary (2008), How to Be an Existentialist, or How to Get Real, Get a Grip and Stop Making Excuses (2009), The God Confusion: Why Nobody Knows the Answer to the Ultimate Question (2013), How to Be Good, or How to Be Moral and Virtuous in a Wicked World (2020) and The Reality of Others: Is Hell Other People? (2024).

Cox's early publications reflect his research into both the philosophical, fictional and biographical writings of Jean-Paul Sartre, with his book, The Sartre Dictionary, providing a comprehensive overview of Sartre's major works, ideas, influences and contemporaries. From 2009 onwards, with the publication of his best selling book to date, How to Be an Existentialist, Gary Cox took the ideas of existentialism to a wider, non-specialist audience, emphasising the self-help and personal empowerment aspects of the theory. An attack on contemporary 'excuse culture', the work urges the reader to face the hard existential truths of the human condition and to take full responsibility for his or her inalienable freedom. How to Be an Existentialist has been cited in such diverse areas as existential counselling and management and leadership training. A tenth anniversary edition of the book with a new preface was published by Bloomsbury in 2019.

In 2010, Cox helped to popularise philosophy with the publication of How to Be a Philosopher, or How to Be Almost Certain that Almost Nothing is Certain, a beginners' guide to philosophy written in the same accessible, popular style as How to Be an Existentialist. 2011 saw the publication of his Existentialist’s Guide to Death, the Universe and Nothingness, a guide to key existentialist themes that, as its title suggests, is something of a homage to Douglas Adams. In 2013 Cox published The God Confusion, a controversial book exploring questions concerning the idea and existence of God that is critical of both theism and atheism and advocates agnosticism as the only tenable philosophical position.

Bloomsbury Publishing released Deep Thought: 42 Fantastic Quotes that Define Philosophy in October 2015, and Cox's biography of Jean-Paul Sartre - Existentialism and Excess: The Life and Times of Jean-Paul Sartre - in September 2016.

Cricket Ball: The Heart of the Game (Bloomsbury, October 2018) is an excursion into object-oriented ontology and the philosophy, politics, aesthetics and literature of sport. A celebration of the game of cricket, the book explores all aspects of the cricket ball phenomenon, from its ontology, iconic status, history, manufacture and future, to its complex, multifaceted, often controversial role during play.

How to Be Good, or How to Be Moral and Virtuous in a Wicked World (Bloomsbury, April 2020) completed Cox's philosophical 'how to' trilogy, adding an exploration of ethics to that of general philosophy and existentialism. The book investigates the phenomenon of moral goodness and what, if anything, it is to be a good person and a paragon of virtue. Part exploration of the age-old subject of moral philosophy, part personal development and improvement manual, How to Be Good is a journey through the often strange and surprising world of ethics. The book covers the moral theories of Kantian ethics, utilitarianism, virtue theory and existentialism, as well as the controversial moral issues of abortion and animal rights. The book delves into the meaning, achievability and reality of goodness through an examination of the work of major philosophical thinkers such as Aristotle, A. J. Ayer, Jeremy Bentham, Gautama Buddha, R. M. Hare, Thomas Hobbes, Immanuel Kant, John Stuart Mill, Friedrich Nietzsche, G. E. Moore, Plato, Jean-Paul Sartre, Peter Singer, Judith Jarvis Thomson and Mary Warnock.

Cox's most recent book, The Reality of Others: Is Hell Other People? (Rowman & Littlefield, April 2024), explores the dynamics of human relationships and in particular Sartre's theory of being-for-others. It is both a comprehensive response to Sartre's famous maxim, "Hell is other people", as expressed in his 1944 play No Exit, and a self-help guide to improving everyday interactions with others. The book stresses the importance of individuality, unique character and personal, existential freedom and is critical of what it sees as the devisive overemphasis on stereotyped group identities in much contemporary identity politics.

== Works ==
- The Reality of Others: Is Hell Other People? - Rowman & Littlefield, 2024.
- How to Be Good, or How to Be Moral and Virtuous in a Wicked World - Bloomsbury, 2020.
- Cricket Ball: Heart of the Game - Bloomsbury, 2018.
- Existentialism and Excess: The Life and Times of Jean-Paul Sartre - Bloomsbury, 2016.
- Deep Thought: 42 Fantastic Quotes that Define Philosophy - Bloomsbury, 2015.
- The God Confusion: Why Nobody Knows the Answer to the Ultimate Question - Bloomsbury, 2013.
- The Existentialist’s Guide to Death, the Universe and Nothingness - Continuum, 2011.
- How to Be a Philosopher, or How to Be Almost Certain that Almost Nothing is Certain - Continuum, 2010.
- How to Be an Existentialist, or How to Get Real, Get a Grip and Stop Making Excuses - Continuum, 2009.
- Sartre and Fiction - Continuum, 2009.
- The Sartre Dictionary - Continuum, 2008.
- Sartre: A Guide for the Perplexed - Continuum, 2006.
