= Joanna Cox =

British mariner

Joanna Cox is a British mariner, who is the first woman to be appointed as Harbour Master for the Falkland Islands Maritime Authority.

== Biography ==
Cox was born in Solihull. She grew up sailing with her father on reservoirs and joined the sea cadets as a teenager. She has worked for the British Antarctic Survey, on both RRS James Clark Ross and the RRS Ernest Shackleton, beginning as a Cadet and working up to Chief Officer. In 2011 she was awarded a Master Mariner's certificate.

From 2012 to 2014 she was Government Officer for South Georgia. Her next role in 2014 was as Master of the RRS Discovery, a post she held for four years. Her appointment made her the first woman to captain a Natural Environment Research Council vessel. From 2019 to 2021 she worked for Cross Solent Ferries.

In June 2021 Cox was appointed as Harbourmaster for the Falkland Islands Maritime Authority, and is the first woman to hold the post. Coinciding with Cox's appointment, Lydia Hutchinson was appointed as a maritime officer for the islands. In December 2021, Cox made the first radio contact in Falklands waters with the RRS David Attenborough.
