= Mitchell Cox (rugby league, born 1993) =

English rugby league player

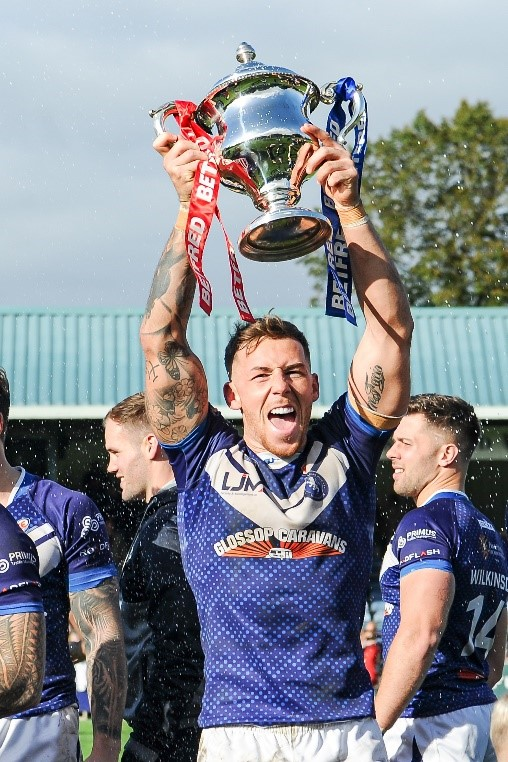

Personal information
- Full name: Mitchell Cox
- Born: 15 November 1993 (age 32) Manchester, England
- Height: 5 ft 11 in (1.8 m)
- Weight: 14 st 2 lb (90 kg)

Playing information
- Position: Second-row forward
Club
Years	Team	Pld	T	G	FG	P
2014–15	Thirroul Butchers	15	13	0	0	58
2017	North Wales Crusaders	1	0	0	0	0
2018–20	Leigh Centurions	19	7	0	0	28
2020	Swinton Lions	75	24	0	0	84
	Total	110	44	0	0	170
- As of 4 January 2023

Mitch Cox (born 15 November 1993) is an English rugby league footballer who last played as a second-row forward for Swinton Lions in the Championship.

He has previously played at club level for the Leigh Centurions (now known as Leigh Leopards as of 2022 season) in the Championship.

== Background ==
Born in Manchester, Cox started his rugby league career in the reserve team at the Leigh Centurions. Between two spells with the Leigh Centurions academy system, Cox signed for Australian Rugby League Club Thirroul Butchers where he played a season before returning to the Leigh Centurions. When the reserve team was discontinued, Cox after one game chose to return to amateur rugby instead. Cox signed with the North Wales Crusaders and spent the next few seasons with Leigh Miners Rangers.

== Playing career ==
=== Thirroul Butchers ===
Cox signed for Australian Rugby League Club Thirroul Butchers for one year in 2014.

=== North Wales Crusaders ===
Cox signed for North Wales Crusaders after a successful spell at Leigh Centurions academy in 2015.

=== Leigh Centurions ===
Cox returned to the professional game in 2018, signing for Leigh Centurions.

Cox stayed at the club until 2020 where he then joined Swinton Lions.

=== Swinton Lions ===
Cox signed for Swinton Lions in the 2020 Betfred Championship season. He has since played 55 games for Swinton Lions in 2020, 2021 and 2022. He also re-signed for the Swinton Lions in the 2023 Betfred Championship season.
