= Walter Cox =

Walter Cox may refer to:

- Walter Smith Cox (1826–1902), United States federal judge
- Walter Cox (footballer, born 1849) (1849–1945), English football player and manager with Stoke City
- Walter Cox (footballer, born 1863) (1863–?), Scottish football goalkeeper with Hibernian, Burnley and Everton
- Walter Cox (footballer, born 1872) (1872–1930), English football goalkeeper with Southampton and Manchester City
- Walter Alfred Cox (1862–1931), English printmaker and painter
- Walter R. Cox (1868–1941), American harness racing driver and trainer
- Walter T. Cox Jr. (1918–2006), president of Clemson University
- Walter T. Cox III (born 1942), United States judge
