= Greg Cox =

Greg Cox may refer to:

- Greg Cox (American football) (born 1965), American former National Football League safety
- Greg Cox (writer) (born 1959), science fiction writer
- Greg Cox (politician) (born 1949), former mayor of Chula Vista, California
- Greg Cox (rugby league) (born 1957), Australian rugby league player
