= Pierre Cox =

French astronomer

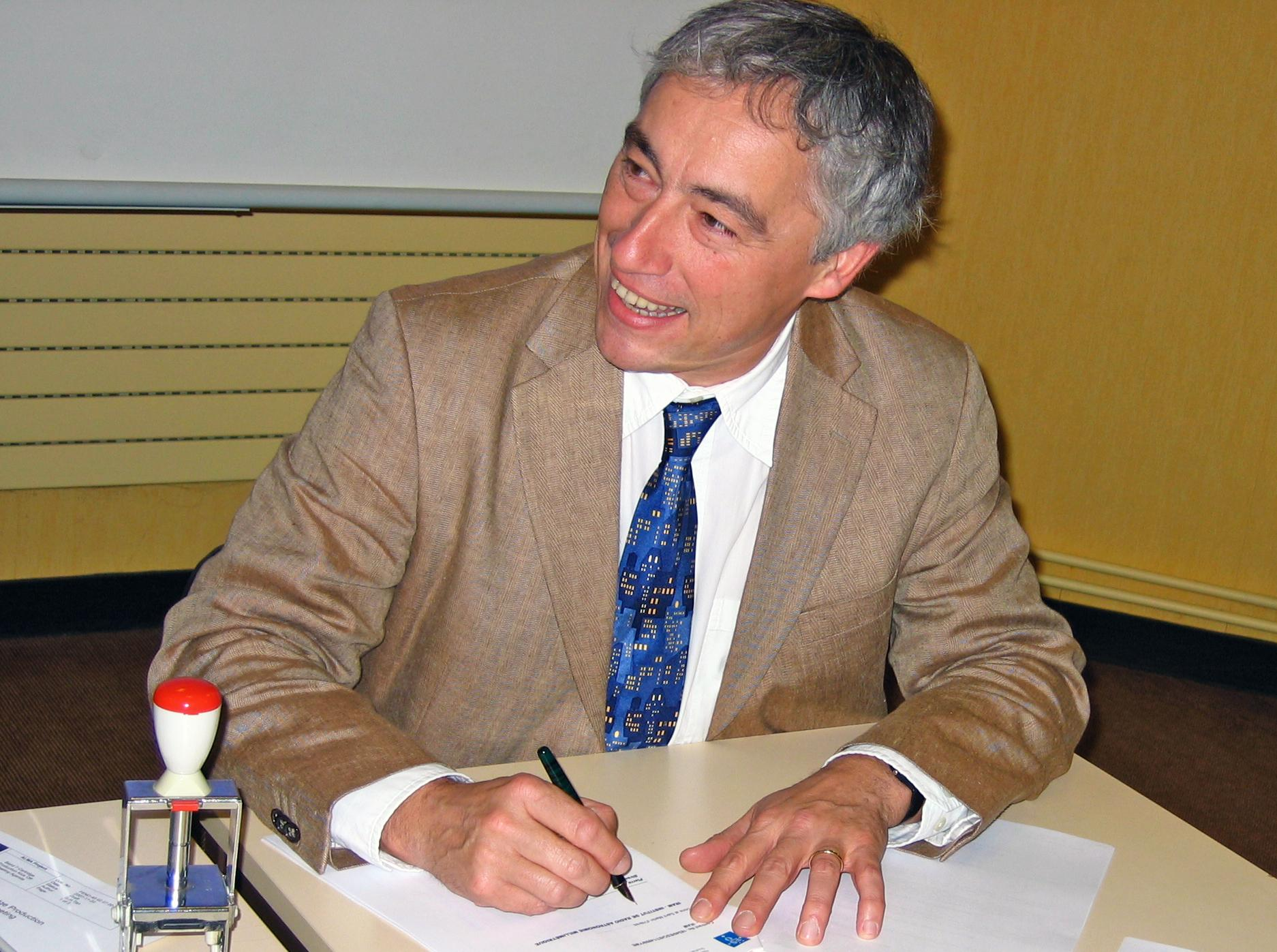
- Pierre Cox signing the contract for the ALMA Band 7 receivers.
- Known for: Astronomy
- Scientific career
- Fields: Astronomy
- Institutions: Former Director of ALMA; Institut de radioastronomie millimétrique; Institut d’Astrophysique Spatiale

Pierre Cox is a French astronomer. Born in Paris to a Dutch composer father and a Belgian pianist mother, he led a musically-oriented childhood from which he rebelled at age 17 to study physics at the Université de Paris-Sud. He is known for his research in the area of millimeter and infrared observations of star-forming regions, evolved stars, and high-redshift galaxies. He has published over 250 refereed papers with more than 22,000 citations in total.

Cox is currently a Director of Research (Directeur de Recherche) (DR1) at CNRS, working at the Institut d'Astrophysique de Paris. From 2013 - 2018, Cox was the Director of ALMA, a position requiring coordinating the efforts of many countries that Cox likened to "being the Secretary General of United Nations". He was previously the Director of the Institut de radioastronomie millimétrique from 2006 through 2013. Prior to IRAM, he had been an astronomer at the Max Planck Institute for Radio Astronomy, the Marseille Observatory, and then the Institut d’Astrophysique Spatiale, an observatory of the CNRS at the Université de Paris-Sud in Orsay.

Pierre's hobbies including drawing and playing piano. He speaks five languages fluently.

== Publications ==
- The ALMA Spectroscopic Survey in the Hubble Ultra Deep Field: Multiband Constraints on Line-luminosity Functions and the Cosmic Density of Molecular Gas.
- The Evolution of the Baryons Associated with Galaxies Averaged over Cosmic Time and Space.
- Ionized and Atomic Interstellar Medium in the z = 6.003 Quasar SDSS J2310+1855.
- NOEMA redshift measurements of bright Herschel galaxies.
