= Herbert Cock =

Herbert Cock may refer to:

- Herbert Cock (Australian footballer) (1888–1968), Australian rules footballer
- Herbert Cock (English footballer) (1900–1977), English football forward
