= Emily Cox (disambiguation) =

Emily Cox (born 1985) is an Austrian actress.

Emily Cox may also refer to:

- Emily Cox (puzzle writer), American puzzle writer
- Emily Cox (conductor), Australian conductor and choir master
