= Elijah Albert Cox =

British painter (1876-1955)

Elijah Albert Cox (1876–1955), also known as E. A. Cox and E. Albert Cox, was a British painter.

He was born in Islington, London, and educated at Bolt Court Technical School. Between 1915 and 1926, Cox designed posters for the London Underground, including a series of posters on the theme of “London Characters”. He also worked as an illustrator for several books, notably Edward Fitzgerald’s edition of The Rubaiyat of Omar Khayyam in 1944. Many of Cox's artworks were displayed at the Royal Academy of Arts, in London and the Victoria and Albert Museum.

A series of portraits of Cox by photographer Howard Coster are displayed at the National Portrait Gallery.

== Awards and honours ==
- Fellow of the Royal Society of British Artists, 1915
- Fellow of the Royal Institute of Painters, 1921
