= Theodolphus Cox =

New Zealand cricketer

Theodolphus Alexander Cox (1855–1908) was a New Zealand cricketer who played four first-class matches for Wellington in the 1880s.
