= Chris Cox =

Christopher or Chris Cox may refer to:

== Entertainers ==
- Chris Cox (DJ), American musician
- Chris Cox (magician) (born 1984), British magician
- Chris Cox (voice actor) (born 1969), American voice actor
- Christopher Cox, British orchestra conductor of the London Shostakovich Orchestra

== Politicians ==
- Christopher Cox (born 1952), American politician, chairman of the Securities and Exchange Commission, 2005–2009
- Christopher Christian Cox (1816–1882), American politician from Maryland
- Christopher Nixon Cox (born 1979), candidate for Congress in New York's First Congressional District

== Sportsmen ==
- Chris Cox (racing driver), in 2009 New Zealand Grand Prix
- Chris Cox (soccer), on All-time Long Island Rough Riders roster
- Christopher Cox (cricketer) (born 1962), Zimbabwean cricketer
- Chris Cox (horse trainer), American natural horsemanship practitioner and clinician

== Others ==
- Chris Cox (manager) (born 1982), Chief Product Officer at Meta Platforms
- Chris W. Cox, former chief lobbyist for the United States National Rifle Association
- Christopher Cox (British educationist) (1899–1982), British educationalist
- Christopher Cox (writer) (1949–1990), writer, member of The Violet Quill
- Christopher Augustus Cox (1889–1959), British soldier

== See also ==
- Christopher Cock, London instrument maker
- Christopher Cocks (17th century), see List of Ambassadors of the Kingdom of England to Russia
- Christina Cox (born 1971), Canadian actress and stuntwoman
