= Nicholas Cox =

Nicholas Cox may refer to:

- Nicholas N. Cox (1837–1912), member of the United States House of Representatives
- Nicholas Cox (British Army officer) (1724–1794), first Lieutenant-Governor of New Carlisle, Quebec
