= Thomas Cox =

Thomas or Tom Cox may refer to:

- Tom Cox (highwayman) (died 1690), English highwayman
- Thomas Cox (topographer) (c. 1655–1734), English clergyman, topographer and translator
- Thomas Cox (priest) ([fl. 1671–1719), Vicar of Drogheda and Dean of Ferns
- Thomas Cox (politician) (1787–1844), American politician
- Thomas J. Cox (1876–1930), American politician and hotel owner from New York
- Tom Cox (British politician) (1930–2018), British Labour Party politician
- Tom Cox (Kansas politician) (born 1985), member of the Kansas House of Representatives
- Thomas Cox (racing driver) (1936–2017), American NASCAR driver
- Tom Cox (writer) (born 1975), British humour writer
- Tom Cox (rugby union) (born 1988), Australian rugby union player
- Tom Cox (American football) (1962–2020), American football player
