= Peter Cox =

Peter Cox may refer to:

- Peter Cox (author), British vegetarian book author
- Peter Cox (cricketer) (born 1954), Australian cricketer
- Peter Cox (politician) (1925–2008), Australian politician
- Peter Cox (musician) (born 1955), English singer-songwriter, member of Go West
  - Peter Cox (album), 1997
- Peter Cox (photographer), Irish landscape photographer
- Peter Arthur Cox (1922–2018), British civil engineer
- Peter Cox Jr. (born 1967), American fencer
- Peter Cox (climatologist), professor of climate system dynamics
- Peter Cox (mayor), mayor of Bendigo, Victoria, Australia, 2014–2015
