= Philip Cox (disambiguation) =

Philip Cox is an Australian architect.

Philip Cox or Phillip Cox may refer to:

- Philip Cox, Australian architect
- Philip Cox (businessman), British CEO
- Philip Joseph Cox (1922–2014), British naval officer
- Phillip Cox (rugby union) (born 1957), Australian rugby union player

== See also ==
- Phil Cox (born 1974), American political operative
