= Margaret Cox (disambiguation) =

Margaret Cox (born 1963) is an Irish politician.

Margaret Cox may also refer to:

- Margie Cox (born 1962), American singer
- Margaret Cox (athlete) (1914–2004), English athlete
