= Mark Coxon =

English cricketer (born 1978)

Personal information
- Full name: Mark David Coxon
- Born: 24 January 1978 (age 48); Salisbury, Wiltshire, England
- Batting: Right-handed
- Bowling: Right-arm medium

Domestic team information
- Years: Team
- 1996–2002: Wiltshire

Career statistics
Competition	List A
Matches	2
Runs scored	29
Batting average	14.50
100s/50s	–/–
Top score	17
Balls bowled	–
Wickets	–
Bowling average	–
5 wickets in innings	–
10 wickets in match	–
Best bowling	–
Catches/stumpings	–/–
- Source: Cricinfo, 12 May 2015

Mark David Coxon (born 24 January 1978) is a former English cricketer who played in two List A matches for Wiltshire. He was a right-handed top order batsman who bowled right-arm medium pace. He was born in Salisbury, Wiltshire.

Coxon made his Minor Counties Championship debut for Wiltshire in 1996 against Wales Minor Counties. From 1996 to 2002, he represented the county in 18 Minor Counties Championship matches, scoring 908 runs at an average of 30.26. His highest score was 144 against Shropshire. Coxon also represented Wiltshire in the MCCA Knockout Trophy. His debut in that competition came against Devon in 1998, with him playing one further Trophy match for Wiltshire in 2001 against Cornwall.
