= Roger Cox =

English cricketer

Personal information
- Full name: Roger Cox
- Born: 27 April 1947 (age 79); Luton, Bedfordshire
- Batting: Right-handed
- Bowling: Right-arm medium

Domestic team information
- Years: Team
- 1967–1975: Bedfordshire
- 1971: Minor Counties

Career statistics
Competition	First-class	List A
Matches	1	5
Runs scored	24	23
Batting average	24.00	7.66
100s/50s	0/0	0/0
Top score	24	12
Catches/stumpings	0/–	1/–
- Source: Cricinfo, 2 August 2011

Roger Cox (born 27 April 1947) is a former English cricketer. Cox was a right-handed batsman who bowled right-arm medium pace. He was born in Luton, Bedfordshire.

Cox made his debut for Bedfordshire against Staffordshire in the 1967 Minor Counties Championship. He played Minor counties cricket for Bedfordshire from 1967 to 1975, making 47 Minor Counties Championship appearances. He made his List A debut against Dorset in the 1968 Gillette Cup. He made 4 further List A appearances, the last of which came against Lancashire in the 1973 Gillette Cup. In his 5 List A matches, he scored 23 runs at an average of 7.66, with a high score of 12.

Cox also made a single first-class appearance, which came for the Minor Counties against the touring Indians in 1971. He was dismissed for 24 in the Minor Counties first-innings by Bhagwat Chandrasekhar, while in the second-innings he retired hurt, having not scored any runs.
