= Rawle Cox =

American hockey player

Personal information
- Nationality: American
- Born: September 5, 1960 (age 65) Trinidad and Tobago

Sport
- Sport: Field hockey

Rawle Cox (born September 5, 1960) is an American field hockey player. He competed in the men's tournament at the 1984 Summer Olympics.
