= Governor Cox =

Governor Cox may refer to the following:

- Channing H. Cox (1879–1968), 49th Governor of Massachusetts
- Jacob Dolson Cox (1828–1900), 28th Governor of Ohio
- James M. Cox (1870–1957), 46th and 48th Governor of Ohio
- John I. Cox (1855–1946), 29th Governor of Tennessee
- Keeaumoku II (1784–1824), Royal Governor of Maui, known as "Governor Cox" by foreigners
- Spencer Cox (politician) (born 1975), 18th Governor of Utah
- William Cox (governor) (born 1936), 26th Governor of Tasmania
