= Karen L. Cox =

American historian and professor

Karen L. Cox at the 2026 New York Film Festival for 14th

Karen L. Cox is an American historian and professor at the University of North Carolina at Charlotte who specializes in and has written extensively on Southern history.

Cox received her Bachelors and Masters from UNC Greensboro and her Ph.D. from the University of Southern Mississippi.

Cox's most recent book, No Common Ground, addresses the intersection between racial justice and the legacy of Confederate monuments, which she first explored when she wrote about the United Daughters of the Confederacy. Her other publications include: Dreaming of Dixie and The South and Mass Culture about portrayals of the American South.
