= Ramsay Cox =

English cricketer

Henry Ramsay Cox (19 May 1911 – 1 December 2005) was an English first-class cricketer active 1930–54 who played for Nottinghamshire and Cambridge University. He was born and died in Radcliffe-on-Trent.

He was an amateur medium-pace bowler who captained Nottinghamshire twice, first in 1933 and again in his final county appearance in 1954. In 30 first-class matches he took 47 wickets, including a career-best six for 30 against Derbyshire in 1951 at the age of 40. Although he played for Cambridge University in 1934, he did not win a Blue after controversially umpiring a match in which a rival later replaced him in the Varsity Match.
