= Sidney E. Cox =

Canadian hymnwriter (1887–1975)

- Born: 1887; England
- Died: 1975 (aged 87–88); Canada
- Occupation: Officer of The Salvation Army
- Years active: 1909–1944
- Title: Major

Sidney E. Cox (1887–1975) was an English-born Canadian hymnwriter.

In 1907, Cox moved from England to Canada. In 1908, he joined the Methodist church but soon converted to the Salvation Army, where he worked from 1909 until 1944, eventually becoming a Major. After he left the Salvation Army he devoted his focus to evangelical revival work. Over the course of his life, Cox has authored or composed approximately 400 songs.
