= Alan Cox =

Alan, Alun or Allan Cox may refer to:

- Alan Cox (computer programmer) (born 1968), British computer programmer and Linux developer
- Alan Cox (actor) (born 1970), English actor
- Alan Cox (footballer) (1920–1993), footballer for Tranmere Rovers
- Alan Cox (radio personality) (born 1971), radio host
- Allan Cox (author) (1937–2016), American consultant and author
- Allan Cox (cricketer) (1873–1896), Barbadian cricketer
- Allan Leslie Cox (1927–1996), Canadian politician in the Legislative Assembly of British Columbia
- Allan V. Cox (1926–1987), American geophysicist
- Allen Cox, Southern gospel singer with the Florida Boys quartet
- Alun Cox, Welsh politician
