= E. S. Cox =

E.S. Cox may refer to:

- Earnest Sevier Cox (1880–1966), American Methodist preacher and racist
- Ernest Stewart Cox (1900–1992), British railway engineer and author
