= Frances Elizabeth Cox =

German translator

Frances Elizabeth Cox (1812–1897) was an English translator of German hymns. She was the daughter of Oxford academic Mr. George Valentine Cox. - also a translator from German, who died in 1875. Frances was a resident of Oxford through her whole life (notably at Cowley Lodge). She never married, and was buried at Oxford's Church of Saint Peter-in-the-East (today a College Library). In 1841, her translations were published as Sacred Hymns from the German by Pickering which contained 49 translations together with biographical notes on the German authors. The second edition was published in 1864 as Hymns from the German by Rivingtons. The translations were increased to 56, those of 1841 being revised, and with additional notes. The best known of her translations are "Jesus lives! no longer [thy terrors] now"; and "Who are these like stars appearing?" A few other translations and original hymns have been contributed by Miss Cox to the magazines; but they have not been gathered together into a volume. Her Obituary notice considered that "she was remarkable for a quiet, unassuming life, spent in quiet study and in the performance of deeds of kindness and affection".
