= Stanley Cox =

Stanley Cox may refer to:

- Stanley Cox (footballer), Australian rules footballer
- Stanley C. Cox (1883–1942), American physician

== See also ==
- Stan Cox (1918–2012), British athlete
