= Allan Coxon =

English scholar (1909-2001)

Allan H. Coxon (22 November 1909 – 27 October 2001) was an English scholar of Greek language and literature.

== Biography ==
Coxon was born in Derby, England, and was educated at Derby Grammar School and at Oriel College Oxford under Sir David Ross. He also studied in Germany with Julius Stenzel and in Austria with Heinrich Gomperz. He was appointed to the University of Edinburgh in 1933.

He had an interest in world politics, joining the new League of Nations at the age of 14. Except for a wartime break in Naval Intelligence he taught at the University of Edinburgh, first as Assistant, later as senior lecturer in Greek language and Literature. He was appointed Reader in Ancient Philosophy in 1964 and retired in 1980 at the age of 70. Coxon is survived by his wife, Carolyn, and their three children, Alice, John and Edmund. He also has seven grandchildren.

== Works ==
- The Fragments of Parmenides: A Critical Text With Introduction and Translation, the Ancient Testimonia and a Commentary
- The Philosophy of Forms: An Analytical and Historical Commentary on Plato's Parmenides: With a New English Translation
