= Sonny Cox =

Sonny Cox may refer to:

- Sonny Cox (basketball) (1938–2020), American basketball coach and jazz alto saxophonist
- Sonny Cox (footballer) (born 2004), English footballer
