= Courtney Cox (disambiguation) =

Courteney Cox (formerly Courteney Cox Arquette, born 1964) is an American actress and producer.

Courtney Cox may refer to:

- Courtney Cox (musician) (born 1989), American guitarist
- Courtney Cox Cole (née Cox, 1971–2019), American athlete
