= Rupert Cox =

English cricketer

Personal information
- Full name: Rupert Michael Fiennes Cox
- Born: 20 August 1967 (age 59); Guildford, Surrey, England
- Batting: Left-handed
- Bowling: Right-arm off break

Domestic team information
- Years: Team
- 1990–1994: Hampshire

Career statistics
Competition	First-class	List A
Matches	19	15
Runs scored	605	83
Batting average	24.20	8.30
100s/50s	1/1	–/–
Top score	104*	23*
Balls bowled	6	–
Wickets	0	–
Bowling average	–	–
5 wickets in innings	–	–
10 wickets in match	–	–
Best bowling	–	–
Catches/stumpings	12/–	5/–
- Source: Cricinfo, 11 December 2009

Rupert Michael Fiennes Cox (born 20 August 1967) is a former English cricketer.

Cox was born at Guildford in August 1967. He was educated at Bradfield College. Cox had been associated with the Hampshire Second XI since 1986, with him having to wait to make his first-class debut in 1990, against Sussex at Arundel in the County Championship. This came as a result of David Gower and Robin Smith being otherwise engaged playing Test cricket for England against India. Against Worcestershire two-weeks later, he made what would be his only first-class century, with a score of 104 not out in an unbeaten fifth wicket partnership of 161 with Tony Middleton. Cox's position in the Hampshire side was largely dependent on the absence of Gower and Smith, thus his appeared infrequently for Hampshire; he made nineteen appearances in first-class cricket and fifteen in List A one-day cricket prior to his release at the end of the 1994 season. Cox was captain of the Hampshire Second XI, and was seen by some as a successor to Mark Nicholas as Hampshire captain. In first-class cricket, he scored 605 runs at an average of 24.20, while in one-day cricket he scored 83 runs at an average of 8.30 and a high score of 23 not out.
