= Ronald Cox =

Ronald or Ron Cox may refer to:

- Ron Cox (Salvation Army officer) (1925–1995), 17th Chief of the Staff of the Salvation Army
- Ron Cox (American football) (born 1968), former American football linebacker
- Ron Cox (racing driver) (born 1966), American stock car racing driver
- Ronny Cox (born 1938), American actor and singer-songwriter
