= Julian Cox =

Julian Cox (died 1663) was an English woman who was executed for witchcraft.

She was accused of having bewitched a maidservant, and to have caused her death by use of magic.

She was executed by hanging in Taunton in Somersetshire in 1663. Her trial belonged to the last witch trials in England to have resulted in an execution, since witch trials gradually became fewer after the restoration of 1660.
