= Alfred Cox =

Alfred Cox may refer to:

- Alfred Cox (politician) (1825–1911), New Zealand politician
- Alfred W. Cox (1857–1919), British racehorse owner and breeder
