= Russell Cox =

Russell Cox may refer to:

- Russell Cox (rugby league) (born 1951), Australian rugby league footballer
- Russell M. Cox (1919–1942), American naval officer
- Russell N. Cox (1926–2017), American real estate developer
- Russell Cox, American publisher, founder of Gargoyle Magazine
