= Michael Cox =

Michael Cox may refer to:

== Political figures ==
- Michael Cox (New Zealand politician) (born 1939), New Zealand politician
- Mike Cox (American politician) (born 1961), American politician from Michigan

== Religious figures ==
- Michael Cox (archbishop of Cashel) (1689–1779), Irish Anglican bishop
- Michael Cox (independent bishop) (born 1945), Irish independent bishop
- Sir Michael Cox, 3rd Baronet (died 1772), Irish baronet and clergyman

== Sportsmen ==
- Michael Cox (cricketer) (born 1957), Australian cricketer
- Mike Cox (fullback) (born 1985), American gridiron football player
- Michael Cox (running back) (born 1989), American gridiron football player
- Michael Cox (soccer) (born 1992), Canadian soccer player
- Mike Cox (American football coach) (born 1965), American gridiron football coach

== Other people ==
- Michael Cox (academic) (born 1947), professor of international relations at the London School of Economics
- Michael Cox (journalist), English journalist and author
- Michael Cox (novelist) (1948–2009), author of The Meaning of Night
- Michael Cox (police officer) (born 1965), American police officer, commissioner of the Boston Police Department
- Michael Cox (serial killer) (born 1956), American serial killer
- Michael Cox (singer) (born 1940), British-born pop singer and actor
- Michael Graham Cox (1938–1995), British actor
- Mikey Cox (born 1977), former drummer for the band Coal Chamber
- W. Michael Cox (born 1950), American economist, speaker, and consultant

== See also ==
- Michael Cocks (1929–2001), British Labour politician
- Mick Cocks (1955–2009), Australian musician
