= Homersham Cox =

Homersham Cox may refer to:

- Homersham Cox (lawyer) (1821–1897), English lawyer, judge, mathematician and historian
- Homersham Cox (mathematician) (1857–1918), his son, English mathematician
