= Nancy Cox =

Nancy Cox may refer to:

- Nancy Cox (virologist) (1949–2026), American virologist
- Nancy Cox (TV news anchor) (born 1967), American television journalist and beauty pageant contestant
- Nancy Cox-McCormack (1885–1967), American sculptor, writer, and socialite
