= Alexander Cox =

Alexander Cox may refer to:

- Alexander Robb Cox (1865–1950), English racehorse owner and cricketer
- Alexander Cox (field hockey) (born 1978)
- Alex Cox (born 1954), an English film director
