= Jordan Cox =

Jordan Cox may refer to:

- Jordan Cox (cricketer) (born 2000), English cricketer
- Jordan Cox (rugby league) (1992–2020), English rugby league player
- Jordan Cox (tennis) (born 1992), American tennis player
- Jordan Cox (née Sullivan), a character on television series Scrubs
