= Brad Cox (physicist) =

American physicist

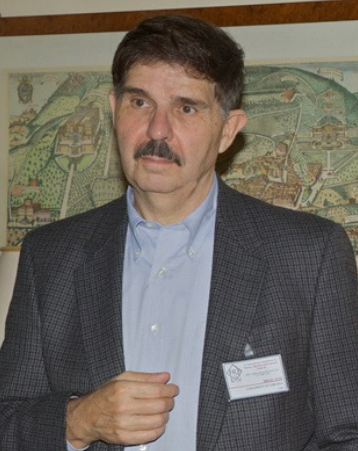
- Occupations: Physicist, academic and researcher
- Awards: Distinguished University Scientist, University of Virginia; Jesse Beams Award for significant physics research, American Physical Society; Outstanding Scientist of Virginia, Virginia Science Museum

Academic background
- Education: Ph.D
- Alma mater: Duke University
- Thesis: Decay Modes of the Eta Meson

Bradley Cox is an American physicist, academic and researcher. He is a Professor of Physics and the founder of the High Energy Physics Group at the University of Virginia.

Cox has conducted research on the fundamental particles such as fermions, quarks, leptons and bosons that constitute matter. He has been involved in numerous experiments at Brookhaven National Laboratory, Stanford Linear Accelerator Center, Fermilab and CERN. Cox's research contributing to the discovery of the Higgs particle was named as one of the 12 most significant research achievements at the University of Virginia of the last 50 years.

Cox is a fellow of American Physical Society, American Association for the Advancement of Science, and American Association of University Professors. He has served as a chair of the Southeastern American Physical Society and as chair of the American Physical Society Publications Committee.

== Education ==
Cox was a James B. Duke Fellow and received his Doctoral degree in Elementary Particle Physics from Duke University in 1967. After taking his PhD, he entered the US Army serving at Aberdeen Proving Ground and Edgewater Nuclear Defense Lab outside of Baltimore, MD doing research on nuclear fusion reactions from 1967 to 1969. During this time, he also worked at Johns Hopkins University continuing his particle physics research until he joined the Hopkins faculty as an assistant professor in 1969.

== Career ==
Cox taught at Johns Hopkins University as an Assistant Professor until 1973. While at Johns Hopkins, he participated in experiments at Stanford Linear Accelerator Laboratory studying the production and decay of K^0 particles produced by high energy electron interactions looking for evidence of CP violation (time reversal violation). Following these experiments. he went to Fermilab on leave from Johns Hopkins in 1972 to serve as spokesperson of Experiment E95. He joined the Lab in 1973 where he held numerous scientific and administrative appointments. He was promoted to Deputy Head in 1975, and then to Head of Proton Laboratory in the following year. After his tenure as head of the Proton lab, he supervised the construction of a major addition to the Proton Laboratory called the Proton West High Energy Lab where he and others then did experiments. After this, Cox served as a Group Leader of Low Current Superconducting Magnet Group in the late 1970's. Then Cox was appointed as Head of Research Services Department in 1981. During this time, he also made a proposal for a collider experiment, eventually called D0, to generate higher energy proton-proton collider interaction to look for new physics. He led the detector development of a Uranium calorimeter for the D0 collider experiment. He served as Deputy Chairman of Fermilab Physics Department from 1983 until 1984.

In 1988, Cox made a proposal for an experiment at the Super Conducting Super Collider (SSC) in Texas and left Fermilab to take a position as a Professor of Physics at University of Virginia, where he founded the High Energy Physics Group at the university.

== Research ==
At Duke, Johns Hopkins, Fermilab and the University of Virginia, Cox participated in a number of high-energy physics experiments on fundamental particles of nature such as fermions, quarks, leptons and bosons that constitute the atoms. In his early career, he was involved in experiments revolving around strong and electromagnetic interactions. One of Cox's experiments measured the charge asymmetry of the ɳ->π+π -π 0 decay in a search for C violation.

=== Research at Fermilab ===
After joining Fermilab, Cox served as scientific spokesman for a series of high-energy experiments that studied the interactions of quarks and gluons by measuring the production of direct photons and lepton pairs. One of the experiments involved observation of direct photon production by hadrons during the 1970s. His work led to one of the first two observations of direct photon production from quark-quark interactions in hadronic collisions.

In the early 1980s, Cox served as spokesperson for the Fermilab Experiment E537, which measured the production of high mass muon pairs by antiprotons and confirmed that deep inelastic structure functions as measured in lepton scattering were the same as the structure functions that were appropriate to describe lepton pair production. After E537, Cox served as spokesperson for the E705 experiment, focused on studying the production of direct photons and charmonium states by antiproton, proton and π± beams.

=== Research at CERN and University of Virginia ===
In the late 1980s, after taking a position as professor at the University of Virginia to build a Particle Physics experiment group, Cox initiated an effort to design a detector that would measure the CP violating effects in the B meson system at the Superconducting Supercollider (SSC) in Texas. After the demise of the SSC, Cox refocused his research on CP violation in the neutral kaon system at Fermi National Accerator Laboratory in the U.S. He led the UVa effort on the KTeV experiment formed to do this measurement. This experiment made the first statistically significant observation of "direct" CP violation determined by the measurement of a non-zero Re(ɳ'/ɳ),. proving that the CP violation (time reversal violation) is an intrinsic property of the weak interaction, a result that had been pursued for approximately 50 years. Cox's group at University of Virginia also made significant contributions to the discovery of a large CP violation effect in KL-> π +π - e + e - .

Following the KTeV experiment, Cox then turned his efforts to CERN laboratory in Geneva, Switzerland and the design of the LHCb heavy flavor experiment at the Large Hadron Collider (LHC). At the direction of the US Department of Energy, Cox changed the direction of his research goals and joined the Compact Muon Solenoid Experiment (CMS), one of the two major collider experiment at the LHC, and directed his UVa group to become involved in the development of the electromagnetic photon and electron calorimeter detector of the CMS under construction at that point in time.

Cox's major accomplishment at the LHC was his participation in the discovery of the Higgs Particle. He was named the U.S. manager of the PbW crystal photon calorimeter, the part of the CMS detector that was most instrumental in the early detection of the Higgs particle. The Higgs particles suffuse the entire universe, and their interaction with all other fundamental particles gives mass to all particles. The search for the Higgs had proceeded for 50 years since it was first hypothesized in 1964. The experimental observation of the Higgs at CERN in 2012 is considered to be one of the major physics discoveries of the 21st century. The University of Virginia designated the research of Cox as "one of the 12 most important research achievements in the last fifty years."

Cox's later work has involved the search for Supersymmetry in the CMS experiment at the LHC, one of the possible consequences of the Higgs unexpected low mass.

== Awards and honors ==
- 1963 - Hamilton Outstanding Graduating Senior Award
- 1963 - Woodrow Wilson Fellow
- 1963-1965 - James B. Duke Fellow, Duke Graduate School
- 1985 - Fellowship, American Physical Society
- 1988 - elected Fellow of the New York Academy of Science
- 2004 - Fellow American Association of University Professors
- 2014 - Outstanding Virginia Scientist of 2014, Virginia Science Museum
- 2014 - Distinguished University Scientist, University of Virginia
- 2014 - Jesse Beams Award for significant physics research, American Physical Society
- 2016 - Fellow of the American Association for the Advancement of Science
- 2021 - University of Virginia Particle Physics Collaboration Award
- 2022 - Outstanding Faculty Member and Founder of the High Energy Group with a ground breaking research career including the detection of direct CP violation as an intrinsic component of the weak interaction and the first observation of the Higgs boson.
- 2025 - Emeritus Professor of the CMS experiment Geneva, Switzerland

== Bibliography ==
- Chatrchyan, S.; Khachatryan, V.; Sirunyan, A. M.; et al. (2012). Observation of a New Boson with mass near 125GeV, CMS Collaboration, Physics Letters, 716(1).
- Alavi-Harati, A: Albuquerque, IF; Alexopoulos, T.; et al. (2020). Observation of Direct CP violation in K-S,K-L -> pi pi Decays, Physical Review Letters, 83(1).
- Alavi-Harati, A., Alexopoulos, T., Arenton, M., et al. (2002). Radiative decay width measurements of neutral kaon excitations using the Primakoff effect, Physical review letters, 89(7).
- Alavi-Harati, A., Alexopoulos, T., Arenton, M., Arisaka, et al. (2002). Search for the K L→ π 0 π 0 e+ e− Decay in the KTeV Experiment. Physical review letters, 89(21).
- Alavi-Harati, A., Alexopoulos, T., Arenton, M., Arisaka, K., et al. (2000). Search for the Weak Decay of a Lightly Bound H 0 Dibaryon. Physical review letters, 84(12).
- Alavi-Harati, A., Alexopoulos, T., Arenton, M., Arisaka, K., Averitte, S., et al. (2001). Measurement of the Branching Ratio and Asymmetry of the Decay Ξ°→ Σ° γ. Physical review letters, 86(15).
- R. M Baultrusaitis, M. Binkley, B. Cox, T. Kondo, C.T Murphy. (1979). A Search for Direct Photon Production in 200-GeV/c and 300-GeV/c Proton - Beryllium Interactions, Physics Letters.
- B. Cox, L. Fortney, J. Golson. (1970). Branching ratios within the neutral decays of the eta0 meson, Physical Review Letters, 24.
- Bradley Burton Cox, Inspire 2025, author 1012883 complete publications.
