= Nigel Cox =

Nigel Cox may refer to:

- Nigel Cox (author) (1951–2006), New Zealand author and museum director
- Nigel Cox (doctor) (born 1945), British consultant rheumatologist and the only doctor ever to have been convicted in Britain for attempted euthanasia
- Nigel Cox (artist) (born 1959), Irish figurative artist
