= Ethel Cox =

English suffragette (born 1888)

- Cox in 1914 under arrest
- Born: 1888
- Died: c. 1981
- Other name: Gwendoline Cook
- Occupation: Activist
- Known for: Suffragette activist, London

Ethel Cox aka Gwendoline Cook (born 1888 – died about 1981) was a British suffragette. Another suffragette born in 1897 is also recorded and her name was Gwendoline Cook.

== Lives ==
In 1913, along with Mary Ann Aldham, Cox was found breaking windows at the house of the Home Secretary. On 11 October 1913, she attempted to throw leaflets promoting women's suffrage into a Royal carriage. Scotland Yard noted "she is said to be capable of committing any damage." As reported in the Criminal Record Office of the New Scotland Yard, on 16 May 1914, she was detained by police for causing damage to public art and public offices. She was also known under the alias of Gwendoline Cook.

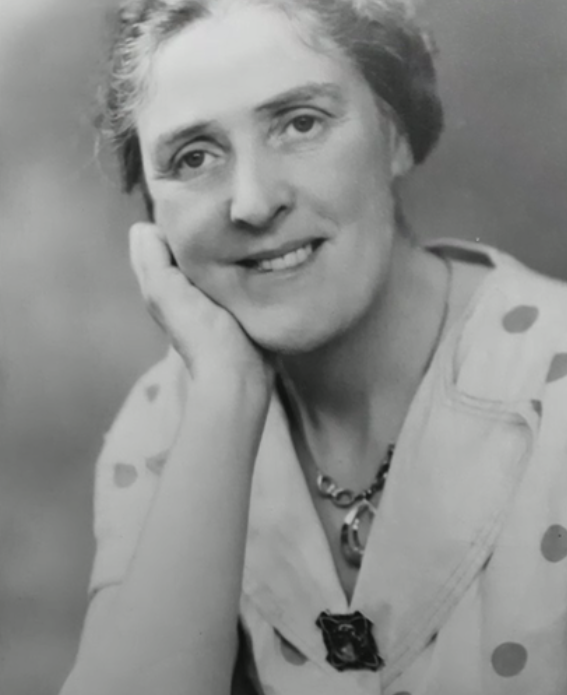
Gwendoline Cook picture shown on 24 October 2021

In 2021 a hunger medal was shown on Antiques Roadshow on BBC2 as belonging to someone's grandmother who was named "Gwendoline Cook". Her picture and medal were shown. She was said to have been born in 1897 and to have died around 1981. Her grandson said she was single at the time. He had letters written by her to other leading suffragettes where she complained that she had failed to get arrested on another occasion. Her medal, her whistle and her letters were thought to be worth £6-8,000.
