= Mia Cox =

American singer-songwriter

- Origin: Newark, New Jersey
- Genres: House
- Occupation: Singer-songwriter
- Instrument: Vocals
- Years active: 2000–2003

Mia Cox is a singer-songwriter from Newark, New Jersey. She was the featured vocalist on DJ Disciple's "Caught Up" (from the Queer As Folk soundtrack), which went to number one on the Billboard Hot Dance Music/Club Play chart in 2002.

== Compilations ==
- Caught Up (2000)

== See also ==
- List of number-one dance hits (United States)
- List of artists who reached number one on the US Dance chart
