= Isaac Cox =

Isaac Cox is the name of:

- Isaac N. Cox (1846–1916), U.S. Representative from New York
- Isaac Joslin Cox (1873–1956), American historian
