= Rachel Cox =

Rachel Cox may refer to:

- Rachel Cox (actress), British actress
- Rachel S. Cox, American journalist and author
- Rachel Cox, politician, author and nonprofit leader
- Rachel Cox (photographer), American photographer

== See also ==
- Rachael Cox, a former Paralympic sailor for Australia
