= Jesse Cox =

Jesse Cox may refer to:

- Jesse Cox (YouTuber) (born 1981), American internet personality
- Jesse Cox (broadcaster) (1986–2017), Australian radio broadcaster
- Jesse Cox (activist), chair of the National Executive Board of the Social Democratic Party of America in the late 1890s
