= Roger Cocks =

Church of England clergyman

- Occupation: Church of England clergyman

Roger Cocks (fl. 1635) was a Church of England clergyman.

== Biography ==
Cocks was the author of "Hebdomada Sacra, a Weeke's Devotion; or Seven Poeticall Meditations upon the Second Chapter of S. Matthew's Gospel," London, 1630, small 8vo, a work which of itself plainly shows, apart from the information supplied in a rhyming preface, that "no profest poet but a preacher wrote it." He also published, in 1642, "An Answer to a Book set forth by Sir Edward Peyton." Peyton (who was a baronet, and who sat in parliament for Cambridgeshire from 1620 to 1627) had been refused the sacrament by Cocks, because he insisted on receiving it in a standing posture, and had published a vindication of his refusal to kneel, based chiefly on scriptural grounds. To this Cocks replied in the work under notice, a closely argued little pamphlet of twenty-two pages. From the introductory notice it appears that Cocks was still only a curate, seemingly in some parish in Suffolk. In "Epicedium Cantabrigiense in obitum . . . Henrici, Principis Walliæ" (Cambridge, 1612) there is a set of Latin hexameter verses, signed Roger Cocks, Trinity College, who was probably the future writer of the "Hebdomada."
