= Simon Cox =

Simon Cox may refer to:

- Simon Cox (Australian rules footballer) (born 1977), AFL player
- Simon Cox (car designer), British car designer
- Simon Cox (director), writer and director of Invasion Planet Earth
- Simon Cox (footballer, born 1984), English footballer
- Simon Cox (footballer, born 1987), Irish footballer
- Simon Cox (golfer) (born 1952), Welsh golfer
- Simon Cox (rower) (born 1970), British lightweight rower
