= Benjamin Cox =

Benjamin Cox may refer to:

- Benjamin Cox (minister) (fl. 1646), English Baptist minister
- Benjamin Cox (sportsman) (born 1975), Australian wheelchair basketball player
- Benjamin Franklin Cox, accomplice in the 1981 murder of Michael Donald
- Benjamin Elton Cox (1931–2011), American civil rights movement activist and preacher
