= Darryl Cox =

Darryl Cox may refer to:

- Darryl Cox (actor) (born 1955), American film and television actor
- Darryl Cox (footballer) (born 1961), former Australian rules footballer
