= Scott William Cox =

American murderer and suspected serial killer

- Born: November 3, 1963 (age 62); Newberg, Oregon, U.S.
- Other names: Seth Scott Cutter; Thomas Wood; Thomas Perkins (pseudonyms)
- Convictions: Murder (2 counts); Forgery; Gun theft; Parole violation
- Penalty: 25 years in prison; Lifetime post-prison supervision

Details
- Victims: 2–20+
- Country: United States, possibly Canada
- State: Oregon

Scott William Cox (born November 3, 1963) is a suspected American serial killer, convicted on two separate counts of homicide in 1993 in Portland, Oregon, and suspected of many more. He was sentenced to 25 years in prison but was granted parole in 2013, five years early. He currently is serving a post-prison supervision term of life. He is also the prime suspect in 20 unsolved murder cases throughout the United States and Canada, although charges were never brought against him.

== Life before murder convictions ==
Since 1975, Cox has been admitted to mental institutions 115 times. He was convicted of forgery and gun theft prior to his murder convictions. At the time of his arrest for murder, he was living under post-prison supervision for the crime of forgery. He worked as a long-haul truck driver, operating mainly within the Pacific Northwest, and traveling as far as Canada and Mexico, and as far east as Ohio.

On November 24, 1990, Rheena Ann Brunson, a 34-year-old woman, was found in front of a Portland, Oregon Safeway store. She had been severely beaten, had cuts on her chin, neck, and back, and had been handcuffed and stabbed in the heart. She was found alive but in critical condition. She was swiftly transported to the hospital, but was soon pronounced dead. A few months later, on February 19, 1991, the body of Victoria Rhone was found in a train in a Portland rail yard. She had been tied up with the attacker's shirt and strangled to death. Both murders were left unsolved for about two years.

== Attempted murder and investigation ==
On May 30, 1991, a female victim of Cox was found alive in downtown Seattle. She had been beaten, bitten, raped, and left for dead. She had ligature marks around her neck and a wine bottle had been forced into her rectum. A witness reported seeing the victim thrown out of the cab of a truck. The victim lived, but required hospitalization. She was interviewed by a local detective, who advised her to prosecute. However, she didn't pursue charges and subsequently left the state.

Local detectives believed this to be an attempted murder perpetrated by a serial killer or a serial killer-in-the-making. The witness described to detectives the truck the victim was thrown out of as having a logo for a company called Woodland Trucking. Upon contacting the company, it was revealed that the assailant was an employee named Seth Scott Cutter.

Detectives interviewed Cutter, who proclaimed his innocence and stated that he had been trying to help the woman. The detectives did not believe him and attempted to pursue charges against him. However, because the DNA evidence found at the crime scene was not yet ready and the victim had fled, detectives were unable to press charges against Cutter.

Upon further investigation, it was revealed that Cutter had previously assaulted another woman on November 26, 1990. A witness reported seeing Cutter in a Mazda with Oregon license plates. Cutter revealed that he was a resident of Newberg, Oregon and lived in a motel in the town when he was not on the road. Fearing that he was a serial killer, police issued a bulletin for Oregon and Washington for Seth Scott Cutter.

Detectives in Newberg recognized Cutter but knew him as Scott William Cox, his real name. He was charged and convicted of forgery for creating fake identification under a pseudonym. Around the same time, he was also charged and convicted of gun theft in Medford, Oregon served a six-month jail sentence. Newberg detectives opened a murder investigation into Cox in 1991, and he ultimately confessed to the murder of Rheena Ann Brunson.

Cox claimed he was mad at his girlfriend and wanted to release his anger by beating a prostitute. After drinking whiskey and snorting cocaine, he picked up Brunson in his car and then began beating her. As she attempted to escape, Cox stabbed her once in the heart, left her for dead, and drove away. He also confessed to the murder of Victoria Rhone and to beating several other women, but denied killing anyone else.

Prior to his murder convictions, Cox had already gained the attention of detectives nationwide due to his job as a long-haul truck driver. His work took him to over 3000 different locations throughout the United States, Canada, and Mexico, making him the prime suspect in 20 other murder cases, which to this day have remained unsolved. He was also briefly looked at by law enforcement as possibly being the Green River Killer, although detectives believed he was probably too young at the time to be such a prolific killer.

== Trial and conviction ==
On September 15, 1993, Scott William Cox pleaded no contest to two counts of murder. He was sentenced to two 150-month consecutive terms followed by lifetime post-prison supervision. In an interview with the local Fox affiliate in Portland, Oregon, a district attorney in the case against Cox explained that the case had been hurt due to police investigators improperly obtaining the confession. The judge had dismissed the confessions in court, and the prosecution relied solely on DNA evidence to prove the murders.

Had these confessions not been dismissed, Cox may have been charged with aggravated murder, which could have led to life in prison or even capital punishment. One year after Cox's conviction, Multnomah County voters passed Ballot Measure 11 creating mandatory minimums for violent criminals, which would have led to a fifty-year sentence for Cox, with no possibility of early release.

== Release from prison and parole violations ==
After serving 20 years of his 25-year sentence, Scott William Cox was released on parole on February 22, 2013. He is required to wear a GPS tracking device, is geographically restricted to Yamhill County, cannot go to parks or bars, and is subject to a curfew every night, unless given permission. Because he was living in Yamhill County, Oregon at the time of his arrest, he was returned there upon his release. He was sent to live in subsidized Yamhill County jail housing. Yamhill County Corrections issued a community alert prior to his release, in order to warn the public of his danger and to advise the public not to attempt to apprehend him.

Since his release, Cox has been arrested at least six times for parole violation. The first occurrence was in July 2013, five months after his release. He was given permission to go to the beach, but had taken a different, longer route than approved. He was sentenced to fourteen days in jail. The following month, in August 2013, his GPS tracking device showed that he had visited a girlfriend's home. She confirmed with deputies that Cox was in her home with her two children.

A sex offender package was added to Cox's parole, which required him to stay away from children and schools. On September 30, 2013, he was sentenced to 90 days in jail after surveillance video caught him smuggling chewing tobacco into the county jail. He was again arrested for parole violations on December 1, 2014, May 13, 2014, and January 7, 2016, although details of these have not been provided to the public.

== Other possible murders ==
Cox is the prime suspect in at least 20 other unsolved murders. Among these cases include, most notably, Tia Hicks of Seattle, Washington, who went missing in December 1990. On April 22, 1991, Seattle police discovered her body and ruled her death a homicide. The only suspect the police had was Cox, who was in the area at the time of Hicks' disappearance. He had already been charged with the other two murders in Oregon at the time he became a suspect in the Hicks case.

After the murder convictions of Cox, the Hicks case was closed. Following his release from prison, the case was reopened in 2014. Mountlake Terrace Police interviewed Cox, expressed the need for the case to be closed, and offered immunity for a confession. However, Cox refused to confess. It remains the only cold case in Mountlake Terrace, and Cox remains the only suspect.

In addition to being suspected of the murder of Tia Hicks, Cox is also the prime suspect of the 1988 murder of Hazel Gelnett in Snohomish County, Washington, Vicky Lynn Perkins of Portland, Oregon, who was found murdered in eastern Utah in May 1990, and Stephanie Douglas of McMinnville, Oregon, who went missing in November 1990. However, the identities of the majority of other possible victims have not been made public, and many investigations are ongoing.

== See also ==
- List of serial killers in the United States
