= Hardin Cox =

American politician

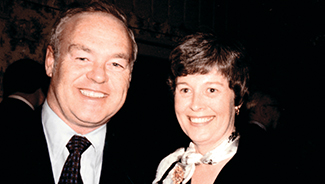
- Hardin Cox and his wife, Virginia Cox

Member of the Missouri Senate from the 12th district
- In office January 1975 – January 1983
- Preceded by: William J. Esely
- Succeeded by: Pat Danner

Personal details
- Born: Hardin Charles Cox, Jr. March 4, 1928 Rock Port, Missouri, U.S.
- Died: March 8, 2013 (aged 85) Rock Port, Missouri, U.S.
- Party: Democratic
- Spouse: Virginia Ann Heifner
- Education: University of Missouri

Military service
- Allegiance: United States
- Branch/service: United States Army
- Battles/wars: Korean War

Hardin Charles Cox, Jr. (March 4, 1928 – March 8, 2013) was an American politician, businessman, and writer.

Born in Rock Port, Missouri, Cox served in the United States Army in 1945-1946 and then during the Korean War. He then graduated from University of Missouri in Columbia, Missouri and was owner of an insurance business. He also wrote a newspaper column for the local newspaper the 'Atchison County Mail.' He served on the Atchison County Commission. Cox also served in the Missouri House of Representatives 1965-1975 and the Missouri State Senate 1975-1983 as a Democrat. He died in Rock Port, Missouri.
