= Coxen =

Coxen is a surname and refer to:

- Charles Coxen (1809–1876), Australian naturalist and politician
- Edward Coxen (1880–1954), English-born American actor
- Elizabeth Coxen (1825–1906), Australian naturalist
- Elizabeth Coxen (1804–1841), birth name of Elizabeth Gould (illustrator), British artist
- John Coxon (pirate) (active 1677–1682), originally John Coxen
- Walter Adams Coxen (1870–1949), Australian Army Major General in World War I

== See also ==
- Cock, Cocks, Cockx
- Cox, Coxe, Coxen, Coxon
- Kox
