= Jan Cox Speas =

American writer

Jan Cox Speas (1925–1971) is a short story writer and novelist born in Raleigh, North Carolina in 1925. She studied creative writing with Hiram Haydn at Woman's College (now the University of North Carolina at Greensboro, or UNCG), from which she graduated in 1945. During 1954–1960, she published Bride of the MacHugh, My Lord Monleigh, and My Love, My Enemy. She also published many short stories in magazines, from pulp to slick. She returned to UNCG and secured her master's degree in Fine Arts in 1964, submitting her fourth novel The Growing Season as her thesis. Her mentor and advisor was noted poet Randall Jarrell. After graduation, she began teaching English and Creative Writing at Guilford College, also in Greensboro. Speas was well known for her historical romances during the 1950s and 1960s. Following her death from a heart attack in 1971, Avon Publications brought out paperback editions of her romances. By 1978, there were more than a million copies of her books in print. The author was married to John Speas; they lived in Greensboro and had two children, Cynthia and Gregory.
