= Edgar William Cox =

Brigadier-General Edgar William Cox DSO FRGS
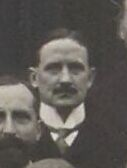
- Cox in 1913
- Born: 9 May 1882; Islington, Middlesex, England
- Died: 26 August 1918 (aged 36); Berck Plage, France
- Military career
- Allegiance: United Kingdom
- Branch: British Army
- Service years: 1900–1918
- Rank: Brigadier-General
- Unit: Royal Engineers
- Conflicts: First World War
- Awards: Distinguished Service Order; Legion of Honour (France); Order of the Crown (Belgium); Order of Saints Maurice and Lazarus (Italy)

Brigadier-General Edgar William Cox DSO FRGS (9 May 1882 – 26 August 1918) was a senior intelligence officer on the British General Staff throughout most of the First World War. He drowned in suspicious circumstances whilst swimming in August 1918 shortly after the German successes in the Spring Offensive, which drove the allied armies back a large distance. Although officially an accident, suspicions of suicide surrounded his death.

== Early career ==
Born to George and Louisa Cox of Islington, Middlesex, in North London on 9 May 1882, Edgar Cox was educated at Christ's Hospital in Newgate and on 21 December 1900 was commissioned as a junior officer into the Royal Engineers. He came head of his class at the Royal Military Academy, Woolwich and received several awards, both there and at the School of Military Engineering. After graduation he was in December 1902 sent to the British colony of Sierra Leone to help delineate the boundary with neighbouring Liberia, with the local rank of lieutenant while there. This task occupied him until 1903, when he joined an Anglo-Portuguese boundary commission in Angola. In 1906 he left this post to conduct a three-year survey of the East Africa Protectorate (later to become Kenya). Back in Britain and serving at Aldershot barracks, he was promoted to captain, married the South African Nora and became a governor of his former school, which had by this time moved to Horsham. He also became a fellow of the Royal Geographical Society and was one of their delegates at the Paris International Map Conference in 1913.

Between 1912 and 1914, Cox demonstrated a talent for staff work and was assigned to the War Office as a general staff officer, grade 3, in May 1912, gaining valuable experience in military intelligence and learning fluent French and German.

== First World War ==
His work was good enough that in August 1914, when he was made a GSO3, he was attached to the staff of Field Marshal Sir John French, in charge of the British Expeditionary Force sent to France to counter the German invasion at the start of the First World War. In France Cox continued his staff duties under French throughout 1914 and 1915, participating in the planning and execution of several large offensives, but sharing in the reassignments at the start of 1916 following French's replacement by General Sir Douglas Haig, although he was compensated by a promotion to major later in the year. During his service on the general staff he was awarded the Distinguished Service Order and was admitted into the Legion of Honour with a Croix de Chevalier. He would later also be awarded the Belgian Order of the Crown and the Italian Order of Saints Maurice and Lazarus for his war service.

Through 1916 and 1917 Cox served in the War Office as staff officer 2nd class to the Director of Military Intelligence and in January 1918 was recalled to France by Field Marshal Haig to take over his military intelligence department from Brigadier-General John Charteris. He was also given fast brevet promotions to lieutenant colonel, colonel and brigadier general to facilitate his position at this post. Within two months of his arrival, on 21 March, the Germans launched the surprise Operation Michael, which recaptured all the ground gained during the Battle of the Somme two years before and nearly drove a hole right through the allied line. Two weeks later, Operation Georgette wiped out the British advances of the Third Battle of Ypres in 1917, seemingly undoing two years of bitter fighting in one blow.

== Death ==
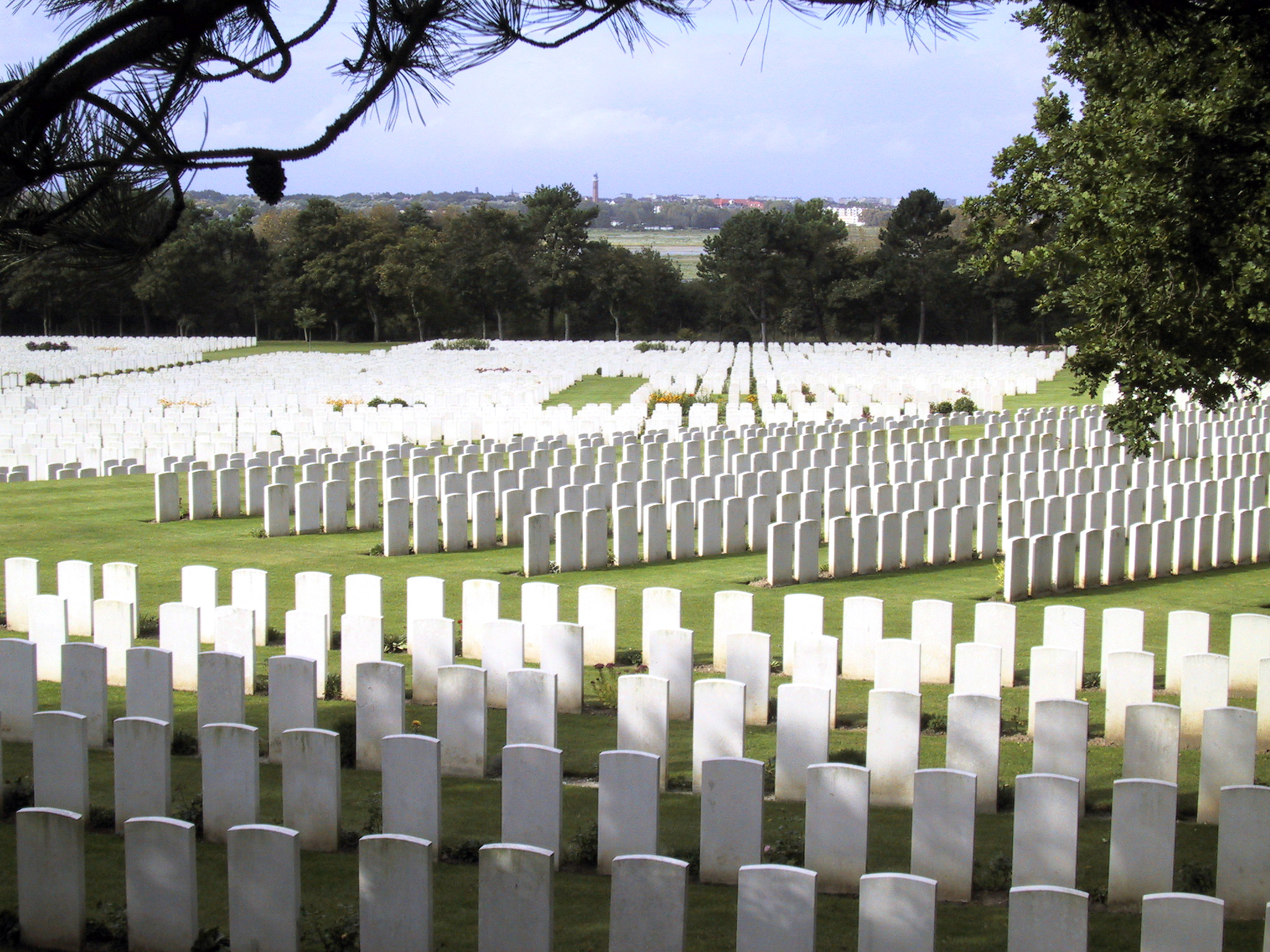
Étaples Commonwealth War Graves Commission Military Cemetery

By the time the German Spring Offensive petered out in July 1918, the Imperial German Army had reached the closest point to Paris of the entire war and had come close to breaking the allied armies and winning the conflict. 850,000 British and French soldiers had been wounded, killed or captured in just four months. Although the Hundred Days Offensive, which would eventually defeat the German army, began two weeks later, the damage to Edgar Cox was done. During the months of the Spring Offensive he had worked feverishly to discover the locations and details of the next attacks and had deteriorated both mentally and physically in the process. Cox was knocked out by the influenza pandemic for much of June and did not return to duty until mid-August. He had become a heavy smoker and by August was no longer eating or sleeping, suffering severely from nervous exhaustion. On 26 August 1918 he announced that he would go for a swim and was driven down to Berck Plage near GHQ at Étaples. He entered the water alone and his body was recovered from the sea some time later. He was buried in Étaples Military Cemetery with full military honours. Following his death, the Royal Geographical Society reported that the British nation in the First World War had "suffered no more grievous loss than in the death of General Cox", and that "He was one of those men, of whom there are very few, of whom nothing but praise was ever heard."

=== Cause of death ===
Although officially his death was reported and recorded as an accident, suspicions of suicide have remained given Cox's disturbed state of mind in the days before his fatal swim. The turmoil of this period was recorded by one of his subordinates, a junior officer named Howard Spring who would later become a famous novelist and who recounted the last days of Brigadier-General Cox in his autobiography In the meantime:

[He] chain-smoked cigarettes by day and night, allowing himself little time to eat and no time to rest, he wore his body to a shadow. The time came when the clouds came, the tensions relaxed and the miracle of salvation intervened. General Cox said he would go for a bathe. His chauffeur drove him to Berck Plage, and the general went down to the sea alone. No one saw the manner of his end. His body was recovered from the sea some time later.
