= Kox =

Kox is a surname. Notable people with this surname include:

- Arnol Kox (1952–2020), Dutch street preacher
- Bodo Kox (born 1997), Polish film director, actor, and screenwriter
- Daniel Kox (born 1952), Belgian cartoonist and comics artist
- Killer Karl Kox (1931–2011), American professional wrestler
- Norbert Kox (1945–2018), American outsider artist
- Peter Kox (born 1964), racecar driver from the Netherlands
- Tiny Kox (born 1953), Dutch politician

== See also ==
- Cock, Cocks, Cockx
- Cox, Coxe, Coxen, Coxon
- Kox
- Kokh Kox, the creator god of the Noon people
- Koxbox, Danish psychedelic trance musical group formed in 1990
