= Cockx =

Cockx is a surname. Notable people with the surname include:

- Jan Cockx (1891–1976), Belgian painter perhaps best known for landscapes, still life and harbor scenes
- Marcel Cockx (1930), Belgian painter
- Philibert Cockx (1879–1949), Belgian painter
- Roger Cockx (1914–1991), Belgian painter

== See also ==
- Cock, Cocks, Cockx
- Cox, Coxe, Coxen, Coxon
- Kox
