= Coxe =

Coxe is a surname, and may refer to:

- Alfred Conkling Coxe Sr., American federal judge
- Alfred Conkling Coxe Jr., American federal judge
- Arthur Cleveland Coxe, American bishop, son of Samuel Hanson Cox
- Cameron Coxe, Welsh footballer
- Daniel Coxe, English governor of West Jersey
- Eckley Brinton Coxe, Pennsylvania Mining Company Owner, State Senator
- Francis Coxe (fl. 1560–1575), English astrologer and quack physician
- Henry Coxe, English scholar
- Hopewell Coxe, American politician
- John Coxe, adopted name of Naukane, 19th-century Hawaiian labourer
- John Coxe (MP) (c. 1695–1783), English politician
- Louis O. Coxe, American poet
- Margaret Coxe, 19th century educator and writer
- Tench Coxe, early American economist and politician
- William Coxe (historian), English historian
- William Coxe Jr. pioneer pomologist and a U.S. Representative from New Jersey

== See also ==
- Cock, Cocks, Cockx
- Cox, Coxe, Coxen, Coxon
- Kox
