= Noel Cox (politician) =

American politician (1911–1985)

Member of the Missouri Senate from the 29th district
- In office 1952–?

Personal details
- Born: April 5, 1911 Spokane, Missouri, US
- Died: October 2, 1985 (aged 74)
- Party: Republican
- Spouse: Rose Mease
- Children: 3 (2 sons, 1 daughter)
- Education: Southwest Missouri State College
- Occupation: Livestock farm and auction business

Noel Cox (April 5, 1911 – October 2, 1985) was an American politician from Spokane, Missouri, who served in the Missouri Senate and the Missouri House of Representatives.
