= Francis Cox =

Francis Cox may refer to:

- Francis Augustus Cox (1783–1853), English Baptist minister
- Francis Thomas Cox (1920–2007), of the Cox Twins, British entertainers
- F. W. Cox (Francis William Cox, 1817–1904), pastor in Adelaide, South Australia

== See also ==
- Francis Coxe (fl. 1560–1575), English astrologer and quack physician
