= W. H. Lionel Cox =

Sir William Henry Lionel Cox (c. 1844 – November 1921) was a British lawyer and judge. He served as Chief Justice of the Straits Settlements in the late 19th and early 20th centuries.

== Early life ==
Cox was born in about 1844 in Mauritius, the son of physician George B. Cox, and was educated at the Royal College, Mauritius and the University of London. He was called to the Bar at the Middle Temple in 1866.

== Legal appointments ==
In 1880, Cox was appointed Substitute Procureur and Advocate General of Mauritius, and in August of that year Puisne Judge of the Supreme Court. In August 1886 he became Procureur and Advocate-General, which position he held until his elevation on 8 November 1893 to Chief Justice of the Straits Settlements

He was knighted in 1896.

In 1896, Cox denied an application for a writ of habeas corpus to free Jose Rizal who was being transported on a Spanish warship back to the Philippines when the ship stopped in Singapore.

== Marriages ==
Cox married first, Lucy Pelte, of Mauritius, who died in 1900; and, secondly, in 1903 in Yokohama, Elizabeth Cushing Pughe, daughter of Lewis Pughe of Scranton, Pennsylvania.

== Retirement ==
Cox retired to England in 1906. In 1915, he was living in Guernsey and was almost blind.

== Death ==
Cox died in Guernsey in 1921. A special service was held in the Singapore Supreme Court to remember him.

== Street names ==
Lionel Cox Street in Curepipe, Mauritius and Cox Terrace in Fort Canning Park, Singapore are named after Cox.
