= Job Barnard =

American judge

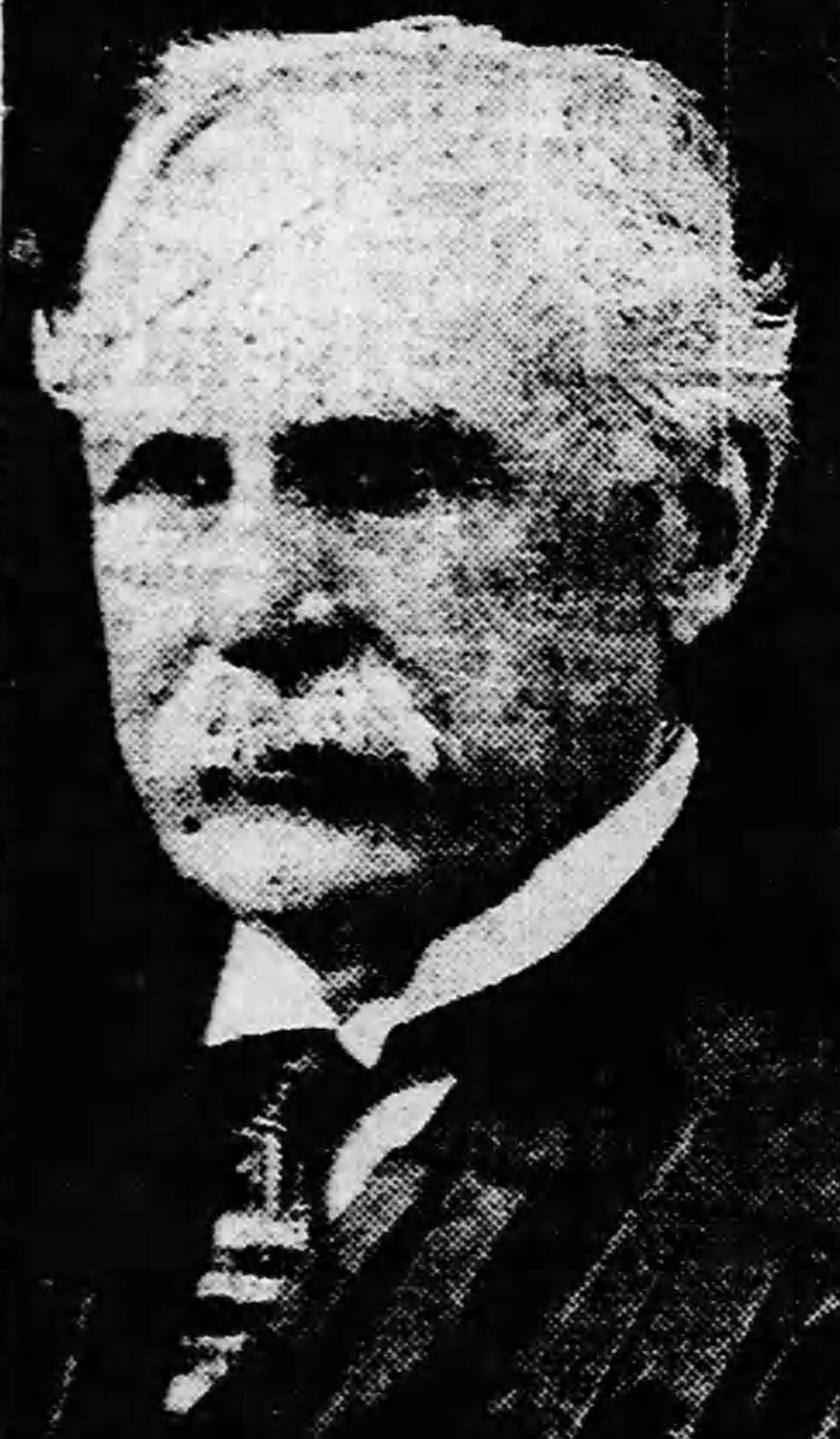

Associate Justice of the Supreme Court of the District of Columbia
- In office October 1, 1899 – June 8, 1914
- Appointed by: William McKinley
- Preceded by: Walter Smith Cox
- Succeeded by: Walter I. McCoy

Personal details
- Born: Job Barnard; June 8, 1844 Porter County, Indiana, US
- Died: February 28, 1923 (aged 78) Washington, D.C., US
- Education: University of Michigan Law School (LL.B.)

Job Barnard (June 8, 1844 – February 28, 1923) was an Associate Justice of the Supreme Court of the District of Columbia.

== Education and career ==
Born in Porter County, Indiana, Barnard served in the United States Army during the American Civil War from 1861 to 1865, where he was a First Sergeant in Company K, 73rd Indiana Infantry Regiment. He then received a Bachelor of Laws from the University of Michigan Law School in 1867. He was in private practice in Crown Point, Indiana from 1867 to 1873. He was an assistant clerk for the Supreme Court of the District of Columbia from 1873 to 1876, returning to private practice in Washington, D.C. from 1876 to 1899, and teaching as a professor at Georgetown Law.

== Federal judicial service ==
Barnard received a recess appointment from President William McKinley on October 1, 1899, to an Associate Justice seat on the Supreme Court of the District of Columbia (now the United States District Court for the District of Columbia) vacated by Associate Justice Walter Smith Cox. He was nominated to the same position by President McKinley on December 11, 1899. He was confirmed by the United States Senate on December 19, 1899, and received his commission the same day. His service terminated on June 8, 1914, due to his retirement.

== Death ==
Barnard died on February 28, 1923, in Washington, D.C. He is buried at Arlington National Cemetery.

== Honor ==
Barnard Elementary School in Washington, D.C. is named in Barnard's honor.

== Sources ==
Legal offices
Preceded by Walter Smith Cox	Associate Justice of the Supreme Court of the District of Columbia; 1899–1914	Succeeded by Walter I. McCoy
