= Walter Smith Cox =

American judge

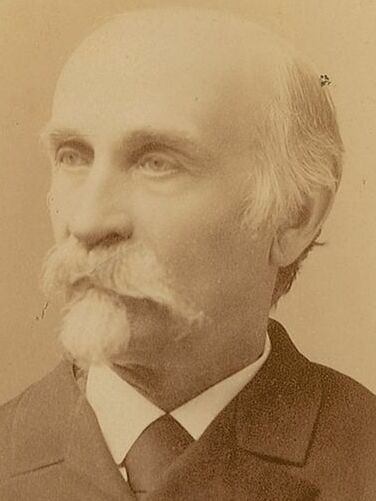

Associate Justice of the Supreme Court of the District of Columbia
- In office March 1, 1879 – July 1, 1899
- Appointed by: Rutherford B. Hayes
- Preceded by: Seat established by 20 Stat. 320
- Succeeded by: Job Barnard

Personal details
- Born: Walter Smith Cox; October 25, 1826 Georgetown, D.C.
- Died: June 25, 1902 (aged 75) Washington, D.C.
- Education: Georgetown University (B.A., M.A.); Harvard Law School (LL.B.)
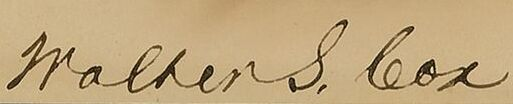
- Signature

Walter Smith Cox (October 25, 1826 – June 25, 1902) was an associate justice of the United States District Court for the District of Columbia.

== Education and career ==
Born in Georgetown, then a separate municipality in the District of Columbia, Cox received a Bachelor of Arts degree from Georgetown University in 1843, a Master of Arts degree from the same institution in 1844, and a Bachelor of Laws from Harvard Law School in 1847. He was in private practice in Washington, D.C. from 1848 to 1879, and during that period was also a recorder for the City of Georgetown, an Alderman for the City of Georgetown, and an auditor of the Supreme Court of the District of Columbia. From 1874 to 1879, he was a professor of law at what was then called Columbian University, known today as George Washington University in Washington, D.C.

On April 16, 1868, Cox testified in the impeachment trial of President Andrew Johnson, having been called as a witness by Johnson's defense team.

== Federal judicial service ==
Cox was nominated by President Rutherford B. Hayes on February 26, 1879, to the Supreme Court of the District of Columbia (now the United States District Court for the District of Columbia), to a new associate justice seat authorized by 20 Stat. 320. He was confirmed by the United States Senate on March 1, 1879, and received his commission the same day. His service terminated on July 1, 1899, due to his retirement.

During Cox's service, he presided over the trial of Charles J. Guiteau, who was convicted of the assassination of President James A. Garfield.

== Later career and death ==
Following his retirement from the federal bench, Cox resumed teaching as a professor of law at George Washington University from 1899 to 1902. He died on June 25, 1902, in Washington, D.C.

== Sources ==
Legal offices
Preceded by Seat established by 20 Stat. 320	Associate Justice of the Supreme Court of the District of Columbia; 1879–1899	Succeeded by Job Barnard
