= John Cox =

John Cox may refer to:

== Arts and entertainment ==
- John Howard (American actor) (1913–1995), American actor, birth name John R. Cox, Jr.
- John Cox (director) (born 1935), English theatre director
- John Cox (sculptor) (1952–2014) British sculptor
- John Cox (sound engineer) (1908–1972), English sound engineer
- John Cox (special effects artist) (born 1959), Australian special effects artist
- Jack E. Cox (1896–1960), or John J. Cox, an English cinematographer
- John Rogers Cox (1915–1990), American painter

== Military ==
- Sir John Cox (Royal Navy officer, died 1672), English naval officer killed at the Battle of Solebay
- Sir John William Cox (1821–1901), British Army general serving in Afghanistan and in the Crimea War, see List of British generals and brigadiers
- Sir John Cox (Royal Navy officer, born 1928) (1928–2006), British Royal Navy admiral
- John V. Cox (1930–2026), United States Marine Corps naval aviator

== Politics ==
- John Cox (Virginia politician) (1944–2025), American politician, member of the Virginia House of Delegates
- John F. Cox (born 1955), American attorney, politician, and city manager
- John H. Cox (born 1955), American businessman, radio host, and Republican gubernatorial candidate in California
- John I. Cox (1855–1946), American politician, governor of Tennessee
- John W. Cox Jr. (born 1947), American politician, Illinois lawyer, and former Congressman, Democrat
- John W. Cox (Minnesota politician) (1888–1958), American politician and businessman
- John R. Cox, American politician, candidate in the United States House of Representatives election in Alaska, 2010

== Sports ==
- Johnny Cox (born 1936), American basketball player
- Chubby Cox (born 1955), American basketball player, full name John Arthur Cox III
- John Cox (basketball, born 1981), Venezuelan-American basketball player
- John Cox (cricketer) (1823–1866), Australian cricketer
- John Cox (footballer) (1870–19??), England international footballer
- Jack Cox (footballer) (1877–1955), British footballer and manager
- John Cox (wrestler), British wrestler

== Other ==
- John B. Cox, British-Australian ornithologist
- John Carrington Cox (born 1943), American professor and economist
- John Charles Cox (1843–1919), English cleric and local historian
- John Coates Cox, died 1816, doctor who tried to free Abdul Rahman Ibrahima Sori from slavery
- John Cox (chess player) (born 1962), English chess player and chess author
- John Cox (psychiatrist), British psychiatrist and President of the Royal College of Psychiatrists
- John Cox (priest) (born 1940), Archdeacon of Sudbury
- John Edmund Cox (1812–1890), English cleric and antiquarian
- John Henry Cox (1750–1791), English explorer
- John Mark Cox Jr., first African American to attend Rollins College, Florida
- John Watson Cox (1902–1984), New Zealand lawyer and town planning administrator

== See also ==
- Jon Cox (disambiguation)
- Jack Cox (disambiguation)
- John Cocks (disambiguation)
- Sir John Cox Bray (1842–1894), premier of South Australia
- John Cox Dillman Engleheart (1784–1862), British miniature painter
- John Cox Stevens (1785–1857), first Commodore of the New York Yacht Club
- John Cocke (disambiguation)
- John Coxe (disambiguation)
