= History of phycology =

History of the scientific study of algae

The history of phycology is the history of the scientific study of algae. Human interest in plants as food goes back into the origins of the species, and knowledge of algae can be traced back more than two thousand years. However, only in the last three hundred years has that knowledge evolved into a rapidly developing science.

== Early days ==
The study of botany goes back into pre-history, as plants have been eaten since the beginning of the human race. The first attempts at plant cultivation are believed to have been made shortly before 10,000 BC in Western Asia (Morton, 1981) and the first references to algae are to be found in early Chinese literature. Records as far back as 3000 BC indicate that algae were used by the emperor of China as food (Huisman, 2000 p. 13). The use of Porphyra in China dates back to at least AD 533–544 (Mumfard and Miura, 1988); there are also references in Roman and Greek literature. The Greek word for algae was phycos whilst in Latin the name became fucus. There are early references to the use of algae for manure. The first coralline algae to be recognized as living organisms were probably Corallina, by Pliny the Elder in the 1st century AD (Irvine and Chamberlain, 1994 p. 11).

The classification of plants suffered many changes since Theophrastus (372–287 BC) and Aristotle (384–322 BC) grouped them as "trees", "shrubs" and "herbs" (Smith, 1955 p. 1).

Little is known of botany during the Middle Ages—it was the Dark Ages of botany.

The development of the study of phycology runs in a pattern comparable with, and parallel to, other biological fields but at a different rate. After the invention of the printing-press in the 15th century, education enabled people to read and knowledge to spread.

=== Exploration of the world and the advance of knowledge ===
Written accounts of the algae of South Africa were made by the Portuguese explorers of the 15th and 16th centuries; however, it is not clear to which species they refer. (Huisman, 2000 p. 7)

== 17th century ==
In the 17th century, there was a great awakening of scientific interest all over Europe, and after the invention of the printing-press books on botany were published. Among them was the work of John Ray, who wrote in 1660: Catalogus Plantarum circa Cantabrigiam., this initiated a new era in the study of Botany (Smith, 1975 p. 4). Ray "influenced both the theory and the practice of botany more decisively than any other single person in the latter half of the seventeenth century" (Morton, 1981).

However, no real progress was made in the scientific study of algae until the invention of the microscope—in about 1600. It was Anton van Leeuwenhoek (1632–1723) who discovered bacteria and saw the cell structure of plants. His unsystematic glimpses of plant structure, reported to the Royal Society between 1678 and his death in 1723, produced no significant advances (Morton, 1981 p. 180).

As adventurers explored the world, more species of all animals and plants were discovered; this demanded efforts to bring order out of this quickly accumulating knowledge.

The first Australian marine plant recorded in print was collected from Shark Bay on the Western Australian coast by William Dampier, who described many new species of Australian wildlife in the 17th century (Huisman, 2000 p. 7).

== 18th century ==
Before Carl von Linné (or Carl Linnaeus, 1707–1778), animals and plants had names, but it took him to arrange the names and group the Earth's plants into some sort of order. Linnaeus was a Swedish botanist, the son of a pastor of the Lutheran church, a physician and zoologist. He laid the foundations of modern biological systematics and nomenclature in his Species Plantarum (1753). He adopted and popularized a binomial (or binary) system of designation (Morton, 1981) using one name for the genus and a second name for the species, both in Latin or Latinised. He referred to the specific (species) name as a "trivial" name (nomen triviale). It consisted of a single word, normally a Latin adjective, but any single word would suffice, to identify a particular species, but not intended to describe it. He developed a coherent system for naming organisms and divided the plant kingdom into 25 classes (according to Smith p. 1 and p. 24 according to Dixon, 1973) (Smith, 1955 p. 1), one of which, the Cryptogamia, included all plants with "concealed" reproductive organs. He divided the Cryptogamia into four orders: Filices (ferns), Musci (mosses), Algae (including lichens and liverworts), and fungi (Smith, 1955 p. 1).

Examination of the reproductive structures had already started. In 1711, R.A.F. de Réaumur gave an account of Fucus in which he noted the two types of external openings in the thallus: the non-sexual cryptostromata (sterile surface cavities) and the conceptacles (fertile cavities, immersed but with a surface opening) containing the sexual organs, which he thought were female flowers. With a lens, he was able to see the oogonoa (the female sex organs) and the antheridia (the male sex organs) within the conceptacles, but he interpreted these as seeds (Morton, 1981 p. 245). Johann Hedwig (1730–1799) provided further evidence of the sexual process in algae, and figured conjugation in Spirogyra (Hedwig) in 1797. He also illustrated Chara (Charales) and identified the antheridia and oogonia as male and female sexual organs (Morton, 1981 p. 323 & 357).

Harvey commented on "...motion, apparently spontaneous, among the seeds at the period of germination. Some found it difficult...to account for these anomalous motions. ...that the seeds becomes (how is not said) a perfect animalcule, which after enjoying an animal existence for a time ceases to live animally, and, reverting to its original nature, gives birth to a vegetable. Thus, this seed was first vegetable, then animal, and then again vegetable,...". During the 18th century, there was a stormy controversy as to whether coralline algae were plants or animals. Up to the mid-18th century, coralline algae (and coral animals) were generally treated as plants. By 1768, many, but by no means all authorities, considered them animal. Five years later, Harvey concluded that they were certainly of vegetable material he noted: "The question of the vegetable nature of Corallines, among which the Melobesia take rank, may now be considered as finally set at rest, by the researches of Kützing, Phillipi and Decaisne." (Harvey, 1847, pl. 73).

The first scientific species description of a South African seaweed accepted for most nomenclatural purposes is that of Ecklonia maxima, published in 1757 as Fucus maximus (Stegenga et al., 1997).

Knowledge of North American Pacific algae begins with the 1791–95 expedition of Captain George Vancouver (Papenfuss, 1976 p. 21).

Archibald Menzies (1754–1842) was the appointed botanist on the expedition led by Captain George Vancouver in the ships Discovery and Chatham of 1791–1795 to the Pacific coast of North America and south-western Australia. The algae collected by Menzies were passed to Dawson Turner (1775–1858) who described and illustrated them in a four-volumed work published in 1808–1819. However, Turner only referred to the taxa referable to Fucus; either Menzies collected very few or he gave only a few to Turner. Three of these species described by Turner later became the types of new genera (Papenfuss, 1976) and (Huisman, 2000) Turner also received plants from Robert Brown (1773–1858) the botanist who accompanied Captain Matthew Flinders on the Investigator (1801–1805). This collection also included many plants from Australia (Huisman, 2000).

The real awakening of interest in American algae resulted from a visit by William Henry Harvey in 1849–1850 when he visited areas from Florida to Nova Scotia and produced three volumes of Nereis Boreali-Americana. These gave an incentive to others to study algae (Taylor, 1972 p. 21).

The first collector of marine algae in Greenland waters seems to have been J.M.Vahl, who lived in Greenland from 1828 to 1836. Vahl's East Greenland species were not recorded until 1893 when Rosenvinge included them in his work of 1893 together with the species collected by Sylow (Lund, 1959). F.R.Kjellman records only 12 species from East Greenland, 4 of which are doubtful; these records are based on Zeller's list (Lund, 1959).

== Early 19th century ==
Carl Adolph Agardh was one of the most prominent algologists of all time. He was born in Sweden on 23 January 1785 and died on 28 January 1859. He was Professor of Botany at the University of Lund and later Bishop of Karlstad Diocese (Papenfuss, 1976). Many species still show his name as the authority of the scientific name. He traveled widely in Europe, visiting Germany, Poland, Denmark, the Netherlands, Belgium, France and Italy, and was the first to emphasize the importance of the reproductive characters of algae and use them to distinguish the different genera and families. His son, Jacob Georg Agardh (1813–1901), who became Professor of Botany at Lund in 1839, made a study of the life-histories of algae, described many new genera and species. It was to him that many workers sent specimens for determination and as donations. Because of this, the herbarium at Lund is the most important algal herbarium in the world (Papenfuss, 1976).

The first records of algae from the Faroe Islands were made by Jørgen Landt in his book of 1800, where he mentions about 30 species. Following this, Hans Christian Lyngbye visited the Faroe Islands in 1817 and published his work in 1819. In this, he described several new genera and species, some 100 new species were listed. Emil Rostrup, who visited the Faroe Islands in 1867, listed ten new species and a total not far from 100. In 1895, Herman G. Simmons mentioned 125 species. In that year, F. Børgesen (1866–1956) started work and in 1902, published his work (Børgesen, 1902).

Jean Vincent Félix Lamouroux (1779–1825) was the first, in 1813, to separate the algae into groups on the basis of colour (Dixon and Irvine, 1977 p. 59). At this time, all coralline algae were considered animals. It was R. Philippi who, in 1837, published his paper in which he finally recognized that coralline algae were not animals and he proposed the generic names Lithophyllum and Lithothamnion (Irvine and Chamberlain, 1994 p. 11).

Freshwater algae are commonly treated separately from marine algae and may be considered not correctly placed in phycology. Lewis Weston Dillwyn (1778–1855) "British Confervae" (1809) was one of the earliest attempts to bring together all that was then known on the British freshwater algae . In this exsiccata-like series he distributed herbarium specimens under the title British Confervae.

Specimens of Anne E. Ball (1808–1872) have been found in both the Herbarium of the Irish National Botanic Gardens, Dublin and the Ulster Museum (BEL). A.E. Ball was an Irish algologist who corresponded with W.H. Harvey and whose records appear in his Phycologia Britannica. The specimens in Dublin do not contain any unusual or rare items. However, they are well documented.

== W.H. Harvey ==
William Henry Harvey (1811–1866), Keeper of the Herbarium and professor in botany at Trinity College, Dublin, was one of the most distinguished algologists of his time (Papenfuss, 1976 p. 26). Apart from Ireland, he visited South Africa; the Atlantic seaboard of America as far south as the Florida Keys on the east coast of North America; and Australia (1854–1856). Between 1853 and 1856, he visited Ceylon, Australia and New Zealand and various parts of the South Pacific (Huisman, 2000 & Papenfuss, 1976). His collection in Australia resulted in one of the most extensive collections of marine plants, and it inspired others (Huisman, 2000). He published Nereis Australis Or Algae of the Southern Ocean in 1847–1849 and in 1846–1851, his Phycologia Britannica appeared. His Nereis Boreali-Americana was published in three parts (1852–1858). This was the first, and still is (in 1976), the only marine algal flora of North America, as it includes taxa from the Pacific coast (Papenfuss, 1976 p. 27). His five-volume Phycologia Australica was published in 1858–1863. These volumes remain to this day a most important reference to Australian algae (Huisman, 2000).

His primary herbarium is in Trinity College, Dublin (TCD). However, large collections of Harvey's material are to be found in the Ulster Museum (BEL) (Morton, 1977; Morton, 1981); University of St Andrews (STA); and National Herbarium of Victoria (MEL), Melbourne, Australia (May 1977). Many of the collectors of this period sent, and exchanged, specimens freely one to another; as a result, Harvey's books show a remarkable knowledge of the distribution of algae elsewhere in the world. His Phycologia Britannica lists species recorded and collected from various parts of the British Isles. For example, he notes William Thompson (1805–1852), William McCalla (c. 1814–1849), John Templeton (1766–1825) and D. Landsborough (1779–1854) who collected, as he did, from distinct sites in Ireland. The collections of these botanists, and many others, are represented separately by collections in the Ulster Museum. Harvey identified specimens of William McCalla distributed in his exsiccata work Algae Hibernicae (1848) and influenced John Cocks (1787–1861) to edit the exsiccata Algarum fasciculi, or, a collection of British seaweeds, carefully dried and preserved, and correctly named after Dr. Harvey's "Phycologia Britannica", with a description of each plant, time of appearance, locality, etc. (1855–1860).

Sir William Jackson Hooker (1785–1865) was a lifelong friend of Harvey (Papenfuss, 1976 p. 26); he was appointed Professor of Botany at Glasgow University in 1820 and became director in Kew 1841–1865. Hooker recognized the talent in Harvey and lent him books, and encouraged and invited him to write the section on algae in his British Flora. as well as the section on algae for The Botany of Captain Beechey's Voyage (Papenfuss, 1976). Margaret Gatty (1809–1873) (née Margaret Scott) (author of British Seaweeds, 1863), and others, corresponded with Harvey (Desmond, 1977 and Evans, 2003).

== Late 19th century ==
Much work was done in this period by many workers and the many specimens became very valuable. Harvey's specimens are to be found in at least several herbaria, as well as those of other phycologists whose names are to be found in historic publications. In the same period, Friedrich Traugott Kützing (1807–1893) in Germany described more new genera than anyone either before or after (Chapman, 1968 p. 13). His publications span the period 1841 to 1869 and added materially to knowledge of algae of cold waters of the Arctic seas. Some of his specimens are stored in the Ulster Museum Herbarium (BEL) catalogued: F1171; F10281–F10318. Kützing edited and distributed the exsiccata work Algarum aquae dulcis Germanicarum, collegit Fridericus Traugott Kutzing (1833-1836).

In 1883 Frans Reinhold Kjellman, professor of botany at Uppsala University, published The Algae of the Arctic Sea. He divided the "Arctic Sea" into different regions which surround the North Pole (Kjellman, 1883). Further research work on the marine algae of the world included: Charles Lewis Anderson (1827–1910) who collaborated with William Gilson Farlow and with Professor Daniel Cady Eaton to produce on the first exsiccatae of North American Algae (Papenfuss, 1976). Edward Morell Holmes (1843–1930), was an expert on seaweeds, mosses, liverworts and lichens, specimens were sent to him from all over the British Isles, as well as from Norway, Sweden, Florida, Tasmania, France, Cape of Good Hope, Ceylon and Australia. He also exchanged specimens (Furley, 1989). and some are in the herbarium of the Ulster Museum (BEL). George Clifton (1823–1913), an Australian phycologist, is mentioned in Harvey's Memoirs, as the superintendent of the Water Police in Perth, West Australia, sent algal specimens to Harvey (Blackler, H.1977). In these years, there were many workers in this field: W.G. Farlow, mentioned above, who was appointed in 1879, Professor of Cryptogamic Botany at University of Harvard (U.S.) in 1879 and published, among other works, the Marine algae of New England and Adjacent Coasts.; in 1876, John Erhard Areschoug, a Swedish Professor of Botany at Uppsala University, reported on some brown algae collected in California by Gustavus A. Eisen (Papenfuss. 1976). George W. Traill (1836–1897) was a clerk in the Standard Life Company in Edinburgh where he worked long hours, yet he was one of the greatest authorities on Scottish algae. Despite bad health, he was an indefatigable collector. In 1892, he gave his collection to the Herbarium of the Edinburgh Botanic Gardens (Furley, 1989).

Mikael Heggelund Foslie (M. Foslie) (1855–1905) published 69 papers between 1887 and 1909. During this time, he increased the number of species and forms (of corallines) from 175 to 650 (Irvine and Chamberlain, 1994). After his death, his collection of specimens was purchased by the Museum of the Royal Norwegian Society for Sciences and Letters (Thor et al., 2005) and there is a small collection of his in the Ulster Museum Herbarium: (Collection No. 42) entitled: Algae Norvegicae (Ulster Museum Herbarium catalogue (BEL): F10319–F10334). F. Heydrich also described 84 taxa and was a bitter foe of Foslie. This left a legacy of complicated and still unresolved problems. In 1950, Olav Gjærevoll issued the exsiccata series M. Foslie: Lithothamnia selecta exsiccata distributing specimens collected by M. Foslie..

It was in the 19th century that the true nature of lichens, as organisms consisting of an alga and a fungus in specific association, was demonstrated by Schwendener in 1867. This removed a source of confusion in morphology and classification (Morton, 1981 p. 432). It was in this period (1859) that Charles Darwin (1809–1882) published his book on evolution: On the Origin of Species by Means of Natural Selection,....

== 20th century ==
In 1895, Børgesen started his study of the Faeroe Islands and published his work in 1902. Later between 1920 and 1936, he published his research on the algae of the Canary Islands.

In 1935 and 1945, Felix Eugen Fritsch (1879–1954) published in two volumes his treatise: The Structure and Reproduction of the Algae. These two volumes detail virtually all that was then known about the morphology and reproduction of the algae. However, knowledge of algae has so greatly increased since then it would be impossible for these to be brought up to date. Nevertheless, reference is often made to them. Other valuable works published in the 1950s include Cryptogamic Botany. written by Gilbert Morgan Smith (1885–1959), the algal volume (no.1) was published in 1955. In the following year (1956), Die Gattungen der Rhodophyceen. by Johan Harald Kylin (1879–1949) was published posthumously. Other phycologists who contributed massively to the knowledge of algae include Elmer Yale Dawson (1918–1966), who published over 60 papers on the algae of the North American Pacific seas (Papenfuss, 1976).

== Development of public awareness ==
The number of books published in the mid to late 19th century shows how interest in the natural world developed. Books on algae were written by: Isabella Gifford (1853) The Marine Botanist..., some of her specimens are in the Ulster Museum; D. Landsborough (c. 1779–1854) A Popular History of British Seaweeds,... third edition published in 1857; Louisa Lane Clarke (c. 1812–1883) The Common Seaweeds of the British Coast and Channel Islands;... in 1865; S.O. Gray (1828–1902) British Seaweeds:... published 1867 and W.H. Grattann British Marine Algae:...published about 1874. These books were for the common people.

In 1902, Edward Arthur Lionel Batters (1860–1907) published "A catalogue of the British Marine algae." (Batters, 1902). In this, he detailed records of algae found on the shores of the British Isles with the localities. This was the start of a new approach, the bringing together of records, detailed keys, checklists and mapping schemes.

The process accelerated in the 20th century. Lily Newton (1893–1981), professor in botany at the University College of Wales, Aberystwyth, and professor emeritus in 1931 wrote A Handbook of the British Seaweeds. This was the first, and for quite a time, the only book for identification of seaweeds in the British Isles using a botanical key. In 1962, Eifion Jones published A key to the genera of the British seaweeds. This small booklet provided a valuable source in the period before the valuable series Seaweeds of the British Isles was produced by the British Museum (Natural History) or The Natural History Museum.

Research advanced so quickly that the need for an up-to-date checklist became apparent. Mary Parke (1902–1981), who was a founder member of the British Phycological Society, produced a preliminary checklist of British marine algae in 1953; corrections and additions of this were published in 1956, 1957 and 1959. In 1964, M.Parke and Peter Stanley Dixon (1929–1993) published a revised checklist; a second revision of this was produced in 1968 and a third revision in 1976. Distribution was added to the checklist in 1986 with G.R.South and I.Tittley's A Checklist and Distributional Index of the Benthic Marine Algae of the North Atlantic Ocean. In 2003, A Check-list and Atlas of the Seaweeds of Britain and Ireland was published by Gavin Hardy and Michael Guiry with a revised edition in 2006. This shows how rapidly knowledge of algae, at least in the British Isles, advanced. First efforts had been made by interested biologists and people capable of identifying the algae; this required books using the botanical names. Botanical keys to identify the plants then developed, followed by checklists. As more information was brought to light by interested workers, some volunteers, the checklists were improved and eventually a mapping scheme brought together all this information. The same pattern of knowledge developed with birds, mammals and flowering plants, though to a different time-scale and knowledge in other parts of the world has developed to this degree.

=== Numbers and checklists ===
As records were collected, the need to draw all the information together advanced. Checklists and annotated checklists were produced and updated so the actual numbers of different species became more precise. At first this was quite local. Threlkeld, in 1726, produced the first attempt at an enumeration of Irish Algae and in 1802, William Tighe published his "Marine plants observed at the County of Wexford"; it included 58 marine and 2 freshwater species. In 1804 Wade published Plantae Rariores in Hibernia Inventae, in which 51 species of marine and 4 species of freshwater algae were enumerated. In the north of Ireland John Templeton and William Thompson were at work publishing on the algae of Ireland. In 1836, Mackay published his Flora Hibernica including 296 species. Adams, in his synopsis of 1908, listed a total of marine species reaching 843.

In more localised lists, Adams (in 1907) listed the species of County Antrim noted that of the 747 species included in "Batter's List" he recorded 211 species from the Co. Antrim coast. In 1907, a list of marine algae from Lambay Island (County Dublin) was published by Batters. In 1960, A preliminary list of the marine algae of Galloway coast was published.

At the international level there are well over 3,000 species of alga in Australia.

=== Identification ===
As the study and identification of the different species became more extensive, it became clear that identification was not at all easy. Harvey's 1846–1851 Phycologia Britannica along with his other publications makes no effort to provide "keys" to help in the identification. In 1931, Newton's Handbook which gave the first key to assist in the identification of algae of the British Isles, in the same year Knight and Park gave a key in their "Manx Algae." Eifion Jones in 1962, wrote a key to the genera of British seaweeds. Others soon followed: Dickinson wrote one entitled British Seaweeds. and Adey and Adey (1973) gave keys to the identification of the Corallinaceae of the British Isles. Abott and Hollenberg, in 1976, published keys to the identification of algae of California.

== Evolution of classification in the algae ==
Linnaeus's "sexual system" (Linnaeus, 1754) in which he grouped plants according to the number of stamens and carpels in their flowers, although wholly artificial was advantageous in that a newly discovered plant could be fitted in amongst those already known. He divided the plant kingdom into 25 classes, one of which was the Cryptogamia—plants with "concealed reproductive organs" (see above) (Smith, 1955). Linnaeus accepted 14 genera of algae of which only four, Conferva, Ulva, Fucus and Chara, contained organisms now regarded as algae (Dixon, 1973 p. 231). As a consequence of the great increase in the number of species, the artificiality of the Linnaean system was appreciated so that during the 18th century and early 19th century, considerable numbers of new genera were described. J.V.F. Lamouroux in 1813, was the first to separate the groups on the basis of colour, however this was not taken up by other botanists and it was Harvey who, in 1836, divided the algae into four major divisions solely on the basis of their pigmentation: Rhodospermae (red algae), Melanospermae (brown algae), Chlorospermae (green algae) and Diatomaceae (Dixon, 1973 p. 232).

In 1883 and 1897, Schmitz separated the Rhodophyceae into two main groups. The first contained the Bangiales and the second the Nemoniales, Cryptonemiales, Gigartinales and Rhodymeniales (Newton, 1931). The Rhodophyta are now arranged in the Orders: Porphyridiales, Goniotrichales, Erythropeltidales, Bangiales, Acrochaetiales, Colaconematales, Palmariales, Ahnfeltiales, Nemaliales, Gelidiales, Gracilariales, Bonnemaisoniales, Cryptonemiales, Hildenbrandiales, Corallinales, Gigartinales, Plocamiales, Rhodymeniales and Ceramiales. The Chlorophyta are arranged in the Orders: Chlorococcales, Microsporales, Chaetophorales, Phaeophilales, Ulvales, Prasiolales, Acrosiphoniales, Cladiphorales, Bryopsidales, Chlorocystidales, Klebsormidiales and Ulotrichales. The Heterokontophyta: Sphacelariales, Dictyotales, Ectocarpales, Ralfsiales, Utleriales, Sporochniales, Tilopteridales, Desmarestiales, Laminariales and the Fucales (Hardy and Guiry, 2006).

Recently (1990s), The Kingdom: Protoctista has been recommended; however, this has not been accepted by many authors.

== See also ==
- Algae – Diverse group of photosynthetic organisms
- Botany – Study of plant life
- History of biology
- History of botany
- List of botanists

=== Miscellaneous notes ===
- Máirin de Valéra (1912–1984). Professor of Botany at University College, Galway (1962–1978).

Publications:

De Valéra, M. 1958. A topographical guide to the seaweed of Co. Galway Bay with some brief notes on other districts on the west coast of Ireland. Institute for Industrial Standards and Research Dublin, Dublin.

De Valéra, M. 1959. The Third International Seaweed Symposium at University College, Galway. 1958, Irish Naturalists' Journal 13: 18–19.

De Valéra, M. 1960. Interesting seaweeds from the shores of the Burren. Irish Naturalists' Journal. 13: 168.

De Valéra, M. * Cooke, P.J. 1979. Seaweed in Burren grykes. Irish Naturalists' Journal. 19: 435–436.

De Valéra, M., Pybus, C., Casley, B. & Webster, A. 1979. 1979. Littoral and benthic investigations on the west coast of Ireland.X. Marine algae of the northern shores of the Burren, C. Clare. Proceedings of the Royal Irish Academy. 79B: 259–269.

- Edward Batters (1860–1907). B.A.; FLS 1883
- Elmer Yale Dawson (1918–1966). American phycologist
- Kathleen M. Drew-Baker (...1925–1927...). University of Manchester. President of the British Phycological Society 1953.
- Margaret Constance Helen Blackler (1902–1981). Assistant Keeper of Botany, Liverpool Museum (1933–1945). In 1947 joined staff University St Andrews.
- Peter Stanley Dixon (1929–1993). Professor Emeritus of Biology at University of California.
- William Dwyn Isaac (1905–1995).
- Harald Kylin (...1906–1949...). Author: Die Gattengen der Rhodophyceen. 1956 CWK Gleerups Förlag, Lund. Specimens in Ulster Museum....
- George Russell (...1983–1984...). President of British Phycological Society 1983–1984.
