= John Cocks =

John Cocks may refer to:

- John Cocks (phycologist) (1787–1861), English botanist
- John Cocks, 1st Earl Somers (1760–1841), British peer and politician
- John Cocks (builder) (1966–2019), New Zealand TV builder
- John Cocks (rugby union), Australian rugby union player
- John C. Cocks (born 1944), American film critic and screenwriter

== See also ==
- John Somers-Cocks (disambiguation)
- John Cock (disambiguation)
- John Cox (disambiguation)
