= John Cocke =

John Cocke may refer to:

- John Cocke (computer scientist) (1925–2002), American computer scientist
- John Alexander Cocke (1772–1854), American politician and Tennessee state militia officer during the Creek War
- John Cocke (colonel), American officer in the Tennessee militia at the Battle of New Orleans
- John Hartwell Cocke (1780–1866), American planter and brigadier general in the War of 1812
- John Cocke (Mississippi), state legislator during Reconstruction

== See also ==
- Cocke
- John Cox (disambiguation)
- John Cock (disambiguation)
- John Cooke (disambiguation)
