= John Cock =

John Co(c)k may refer to:

- John Cock (MP for Sandwich), see Sandwich (UK Parliament constituency)
- John Cock (MP died 1557), MP for Hertfordshire and Calne
- John Cock (RAF officer), Australian-born fighter pilot of World War II
- Jack Cock, footballer
- John Cok (fl. 1420), MP for Chichester
- John S. Cock (1801–1869), American politician and judge from Ohio

== See also ==
- John Cocke (disambiguation)
- John Cocks (disambiguation)
- Johncock
