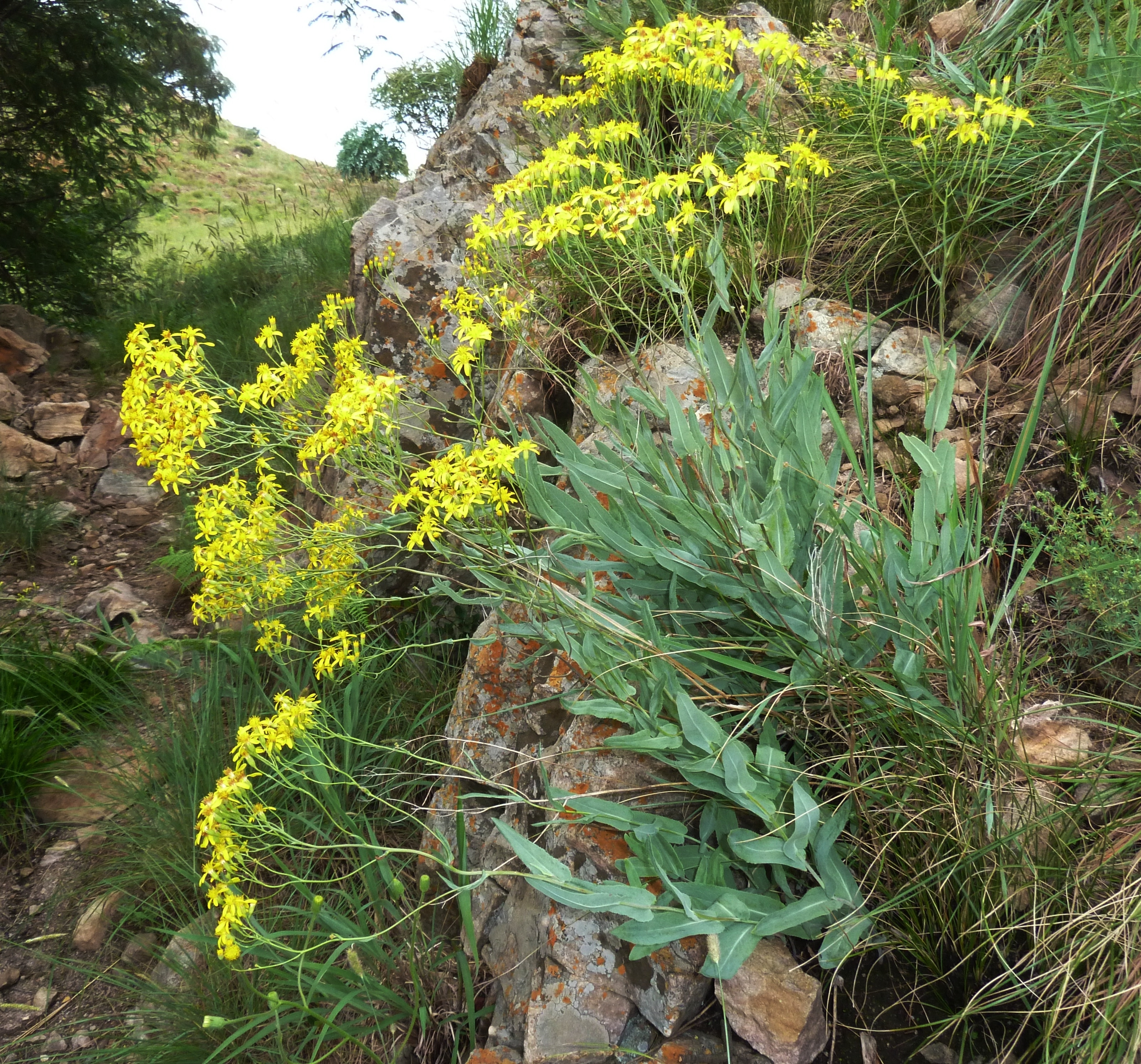

Scientific classification
- Kingdom: Plantae
- Clade: Tracheophytes
- Clade: Angiosperms
- Clade: Eudicots
- Clade: Asterids
- Order: Asterales
- Family: Asteraceae
- Genus: Senecio
- Species: S. venosus

Binomial name
- Senecio venosus Harv.

= Senecio venosus =

Species of flowering plant

Senecio venosus is a species of flowering plant in the family Asteraceae. It is endemic to South Africa, Botswana, and Zimbabwe.
