= Lamourouxia =

Lamourouxia may refer to:

- Lamourouxia (bryozoan), a genus of bryozoans in the family Calloporidae
- Lamourouxia (plant), a genus of plants in the family Orobanchaceae
- Lamourouxia, a genus of red algae in the family Delesseriaceae, synonym of Claudea
