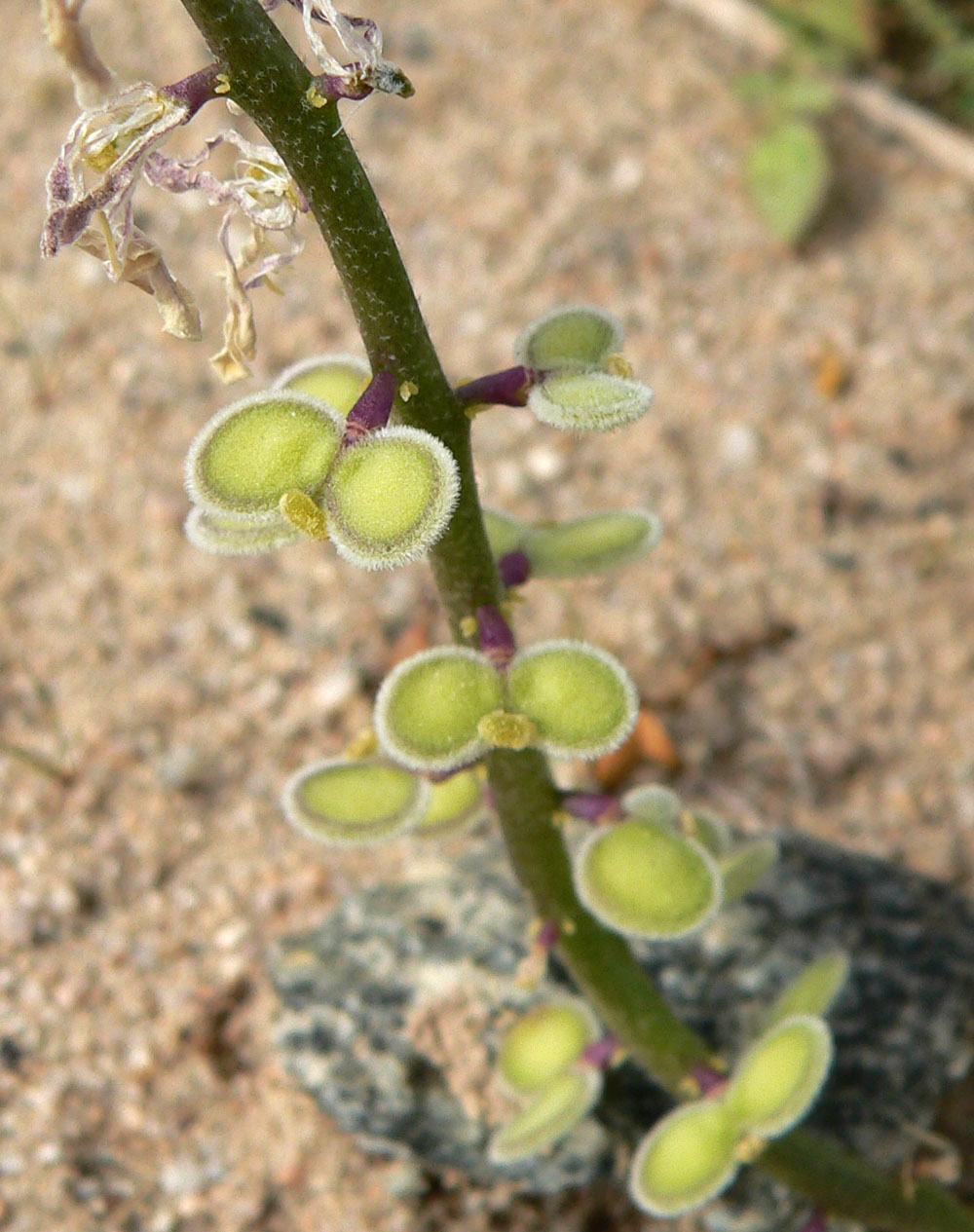
- Dithyrea californica near Baker, CA

Scientific classification
- Kingdom: Plantae
- Clade: Tracheophytes
- Clade: Angiosperms
- Clade: Eudicots
- Clade: Rosids
- Order: Brassicales
- Family: Brassicaceae
- Genus: Dithyrea; Harv.

Species
- 1 or 2; see text

= Dithyrea =

Genus of flowering plants

Dithyrea (shieldpod) is a small genus of flowering plants in the family Brassicaceae containing only one or two species. The California shieldpod or spectacle-pod, Dithyrea californica, is an abundant and unique-looking herb native to the southwestern United States and northern Mexico. The beach shieldpod, Dithyrea maritima, a rare plant found only on the coast of California and Baja California, is sometimes considered a subspecies of D. californica.
