= Geococcus =

Geococcus may refer to:

- Geococcus (bug), a genus of bugs in the family Pseudococcidae
- Geococcus (plant), a genus of plants in the family Brassicaceae
- Geococcus (eukaryote), a genus of eukaryote in the order Arcellinida
