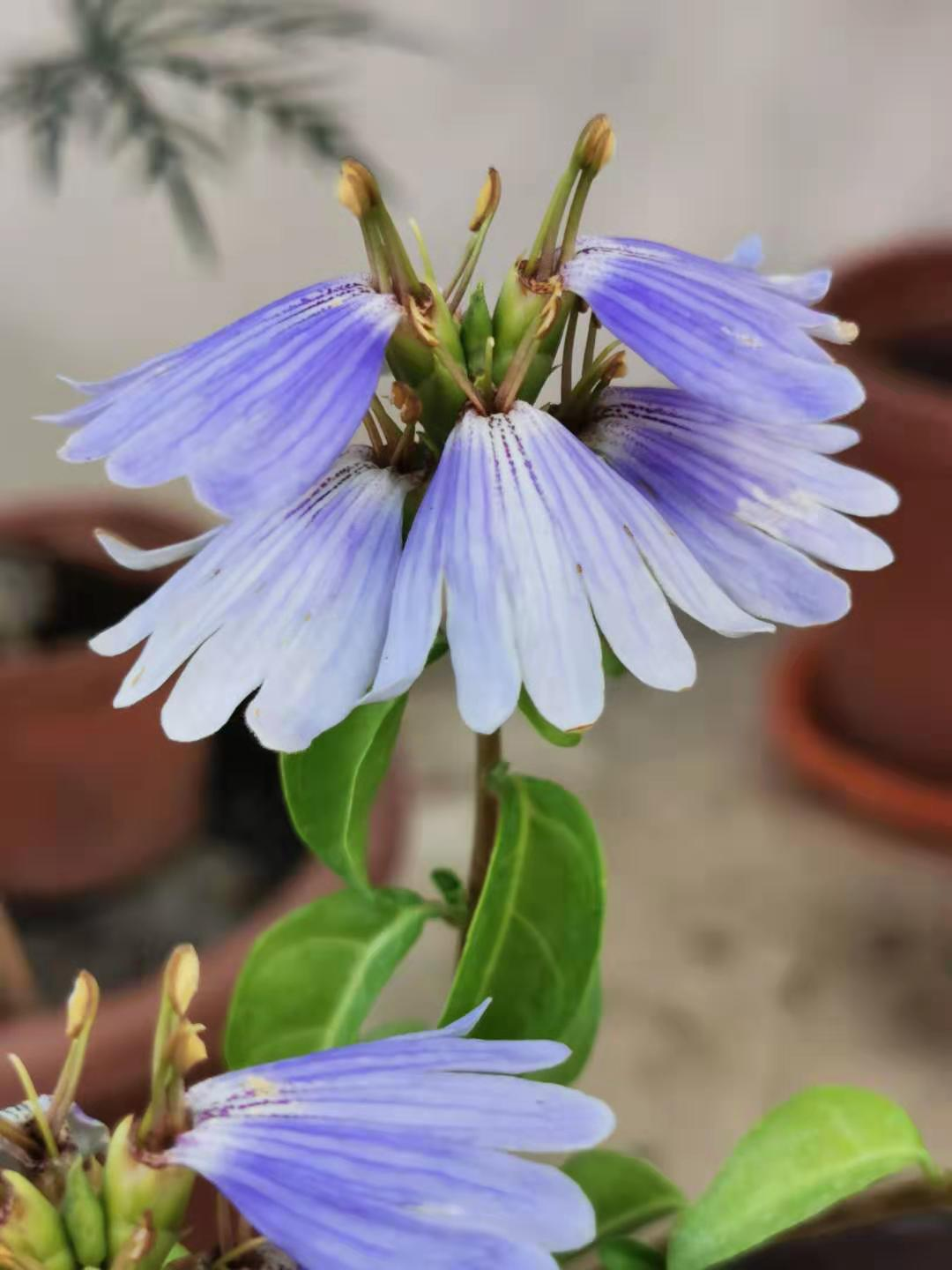
- Sclerochiton harveyanus

Scientific classification
- Kingdom: Plantae
- Clade: Tracheophytes
- Clade: Angiosperms
- Clade: Eudicots
- Clade: Asterids
- Order: Lamiales
- Family: Acanthaceae
- Subfamily: Acanthoideae
- Tribe: Acantheae
- Genus: Sclerochiton; Harv. (1842)

Synonyms
- Butayea De Wild. (1903); Isacanthus Nees (1847); Pseudoblepharis Baill. (1890)

= Sclerochiton =

Genus of flowering plants

Sclerochiton is a genus of flowering plants in the family Acanthaceae. It includes 18 species native to tropical and southern Africa.

== Species ==
Species accepted by the Plants of the World Online as of February 2024:

- Sclerochiton apiculatus Vollesen
- Sclerochiton bequaertii De Wild.
- Sclerochiton boivinii (Baill.) C.B.Clarke
- Sclerochiton coeruleus (Lindau) S.Moore
- Sclerochiton glandulosissimus Vollesen
- Sclerochiton harveyanus Nees
- Sclerochiton hirsutus Vollesen
- Sclerochiton ilicifolius A.Meeuse
- Sclerochiton insignis (Mildbr.) Vollesen
- Sclerochiton kirkii (T.Anderson) C.B.Clarke
- Sclerochiton nitidus (S.Moore) C.B.Clarke
- Sclerochiton obtusisepalus C.B.Clarke
- Sclerochiton odoratissimus Hilliard
- Sclerochiton preussii (Lindau) C.B.Clarke
- Sclerochiton tanzaniensis Vollesen
- Sclerochiton triacanthus A.Meeuse
- Sclerochiton uluguruensis Vollesen
- Sclerochiton vogelii (Nees) T.Anderson
