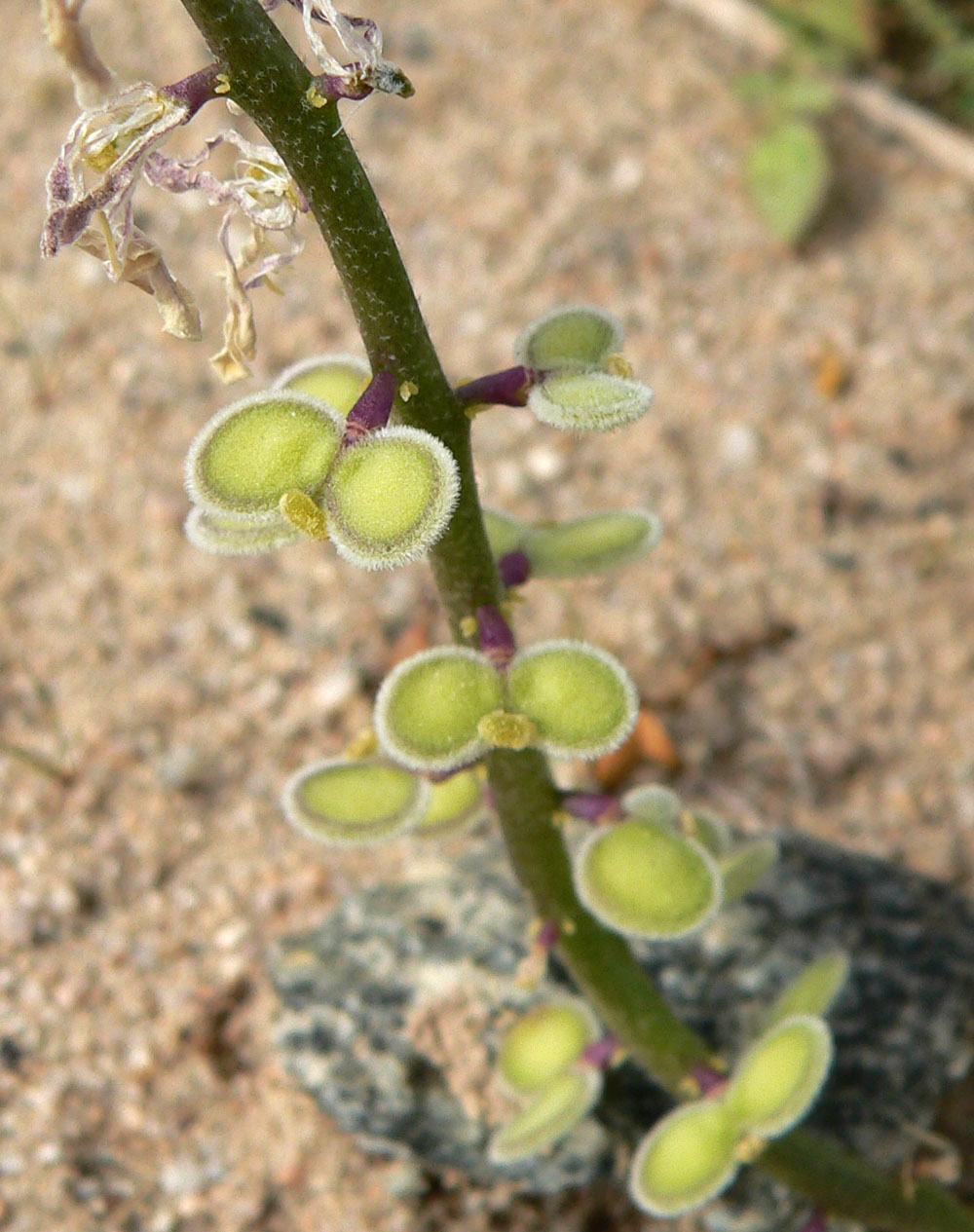
- Dithyrea californica near Baker, CA

Scientific classification
- Kingdom: Plantae
- Clade: Tracheophytes
- Clade: Angiosperms
- Clade: Eudicots
- Clade: Rosids
- Order: Brassicales
- Family: Brassicaceae
- Genus: Dithyrea
- Species: D. californica

Binomial name
- Dithyrea californica Harv.

Synonyms
- Biscutella californica (Harv.) A.Gray; Dithyrea californica var. clinata (J.F.Macbr. & Payson) Wiggins; Dithyrea clinata J.F.Macbr. & Payson

= Dithyrea californica =

Species of flowering plant

Dithyrea californica (spectacle pod, California spectacle pod, California shield pod) is an annual plant in the family Brassicaceae. It is found in deserts of the Southwestern United States.
