= Cox's sandpiper =

Scientific classification
- Kingdom: Animalia
- Phylum: Chordata
- Class: Aves
- Order: Charadriiformes
- Family: Scolopacidae
- Genus: Calidris
- Species: C. melanotos♂ × C. ferruginea♀

Synonyms
- Calidris paramelanotos Parker, 1982

Species of bird

Cox's sandpiper is a hybrid between a male pectoral sandpiper (Calidris melanotos) and a female curlew sandpiper (Calidris ferruginea). First discovered in Australia in the 1950s, it was originally described as a species new to science and named after Australian ornithologist John B. Cox. However, it was later found to be a hybrid. Most if not all birds found to date are males, in accord with Haldane's rule.

== Discovery and naming ==
The first Cox's sandpiper was recorded in Australia in 1955. Observers initially identified the birds as dunlins (Calidris alpina), but as additional birds were discovered — particularly in the period between 1968 and 1975 — doubts were cast on the initial identifications. By 1986, at least 20 such birds had been observed along the continent's southern and eastern coasts, though no consensus existed about their identity; among the theories postulated were that the birds were aberrant individuals or a previously undescribed subspecies of the dunlin, or that they were a stereotyped hybrid (meaning that all birds of some hybrid parentage appear near-identical). In order to help resolve the problem of the birds' identity John Cox collected two specimens, one in 1975 and another in 1977, and deposited them at the South Australian Museum. Thinking that the birds might be "Cooper's sandpipers" (see below), the two specimens were sent to the American Museum of Natural History in 1977 for comparison with the type specimen from which that form was named; replies indicated that the birds were not of the same taxon. A live bird was caught and photographed in 1981, and, in 1982, Shane Parker formally described the bird as a new species.

Following Parker's description, the view that these birds represented a good species (as opposed to aberrant individuals or hybrids) gained some ground; the "species" was listed in the Shorebirds volume of the Helm Identification Guides, for example, although with a note indicating that the possibility of hybrid origin could not be ruled out.

== Appearance ==
Cox's sandpipers are similar in size and shape to pectoral sandpipers and sharp-tailed sandpipers (Calidris acuminata). The bill is fairly long, blackish and slightly drooping, sometimes with a yellowish base; the legs are dull brownish-green in colour. The birds' wings at rest extend just slightly beyond the tail.

Cox's sandpiper has never been observed in breeding plumage. All mature specimens that have been observed have been in non-breeding plumage, although some have started to acquire a few breeding-plumage feathers. In non-breeding plumage, birds are brown-grey above and white below, with a brown-grey breast-band and no flank-streaks. When hints of a breeding plumage are acquired, a rusty tinge develops on the breast and ear-coverts, some flank streaks appear, and on the upper parts the non-breeding-plumaged feathers are replaced by feathers with black centres, grey tips and buff or pale chestnut fringes.

Juvenile Cox's sandpipers are known from only two individuals, one from Massachusetts and one from Japan, both believed to be Cox's sandpiper based on their morphology, but not identified with certainty. These birds closely resembled juvenile pectoral sandpipers, but without a well-demarcated breast-band (although the Japanese bird showed strong streaking on the breast-sides). In this plumage, the birds also showed large amounts of white on the uppertail-coverts.

== Subsequent (and earlier) records ==
=== The original specimen of "Cooper's" sandpiper ===
Cooper's sandpiper, "Calidris" × cooperi, was described (as Tringa cooperi) by Spencer Fullerton Baird in 1858 based on a specimen collected on Long Island, New York, in May 1833 and deposited at the American Museum of Natural History. It was named after the conchologist William Cooper, who collected the bird.

When John Cox examined slides of the specimen in February 1988, he found a number of features in common with the Australian birds. The birds appeared to be of the same size and structure, with several plumage features in common including a heavily streaked head and neck with a rusty wash, a split supercilium, and identically-patterned upperparts feathers. Although the bill of the Cooper's specimen was straight (compared to the drooping bill of Cox's), it was suggested that this could be due to damage and distortion. The birds do differ insofar as that the Cooper's specimen has a spotted, not streaked, breast. This could be accounted for by the plumage stage, given the differences in the times of year when the specimens were collected; also, some of the Cox's sandpipers seen in Australia have had similar underparts markings to the Cooper's specimen. Nonetheless, those that have directly compared the Cooper's and Cox's sandpipers feel that they are not identical.

=== Pattern of records in Australia ===
Most records to date have come from the more heavily populated south and south-east of Australia.

=== Records outside Australia ===
A mysterious juvenile Calidris sandpiper was encountered on Duxbury Beach, Plymouth Bay, Massachusetts, United States, in September, 1987, and was tentatively identified as a Cox's sandpiper. The bird was observed in the field, and also trapped and examined in the hand as well as banded. Several accounts of this individual were published.

In late August, 2001, another juvenile Calidris showing features of both pectoral and curlew sandpipers was found at Shintone, Ibaraki Prefecture, Japan. An account of this bird, illustrated with photographs, was published in the British journal Birding World. This bird was believed to be another juvenile "Cox's sandpiper".

== The mystery solved ==
The birds were conclusively shown to be hybrids by Christidis et al. (1996). They analyzed 3 specimens of Cox's sandpiper and found that the mtDNA sequence of the cytochrome b gene was identical to that of Curlew sandpipers, while allozyme variation fit the pattern seen in curlew and pectoral sandpipers, but neither agreed with that of other proposed parent species (sharp-tailed sandpiper, white-rumped sandpiper, and ruff). Since mtDNA is inherited only from the mother, they concluded that the parentage of Cox's sandpipers was a male pectoral and a female curlew sandpiper.

== See also ==
- Hybridisation in shorebirds
