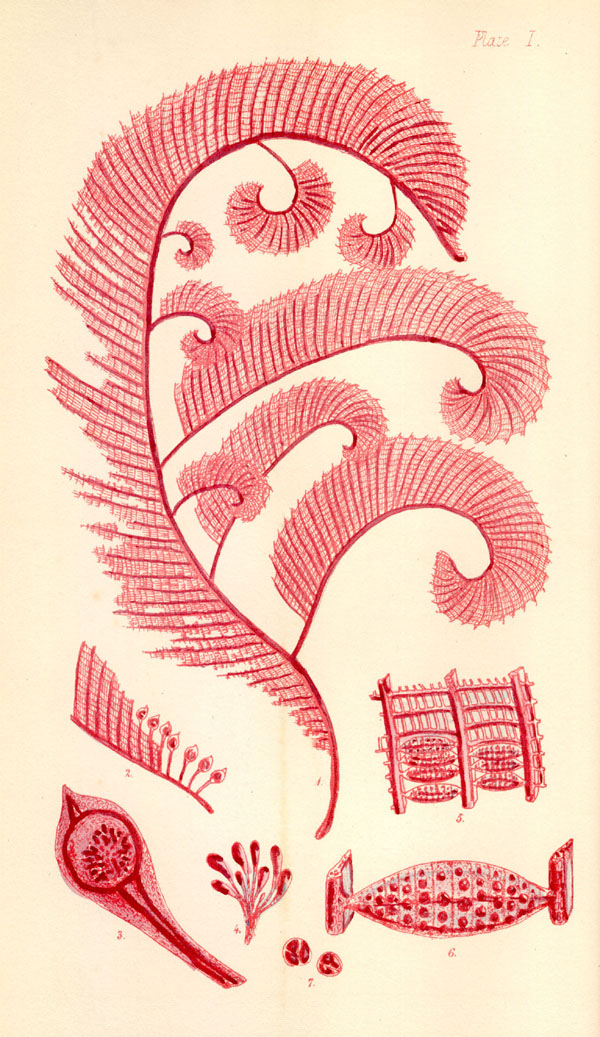
- Claudea elegans W.H. Harvey Phycologia Australica Plate 1

Scientific classification
- Clade: Archaeplastida
- Division: Rhodophyta
- Class: Florideophyceae
- Order: Ceramiales
- Family: Delesseriaceae
- Genus: Claudea
- Species: C. elegans

Binomial name
- Claudea elegans J.V. Lamouroux, 1813

Synonyms
- Oneillia elegans (J.V.Lamouroux) C.Agardh 1822; Fucus claudei Turner 1811; Lamourouxia elegans C.Agardh 1817; Claudia elegans

= Claudea elegans =

Species of alga

Claudea elegans is a marine red alga species in the genus Claudea. It occurs in tropical waters in Australia, India, Pakistan and Brazil and may reach 40 centimeters in length.

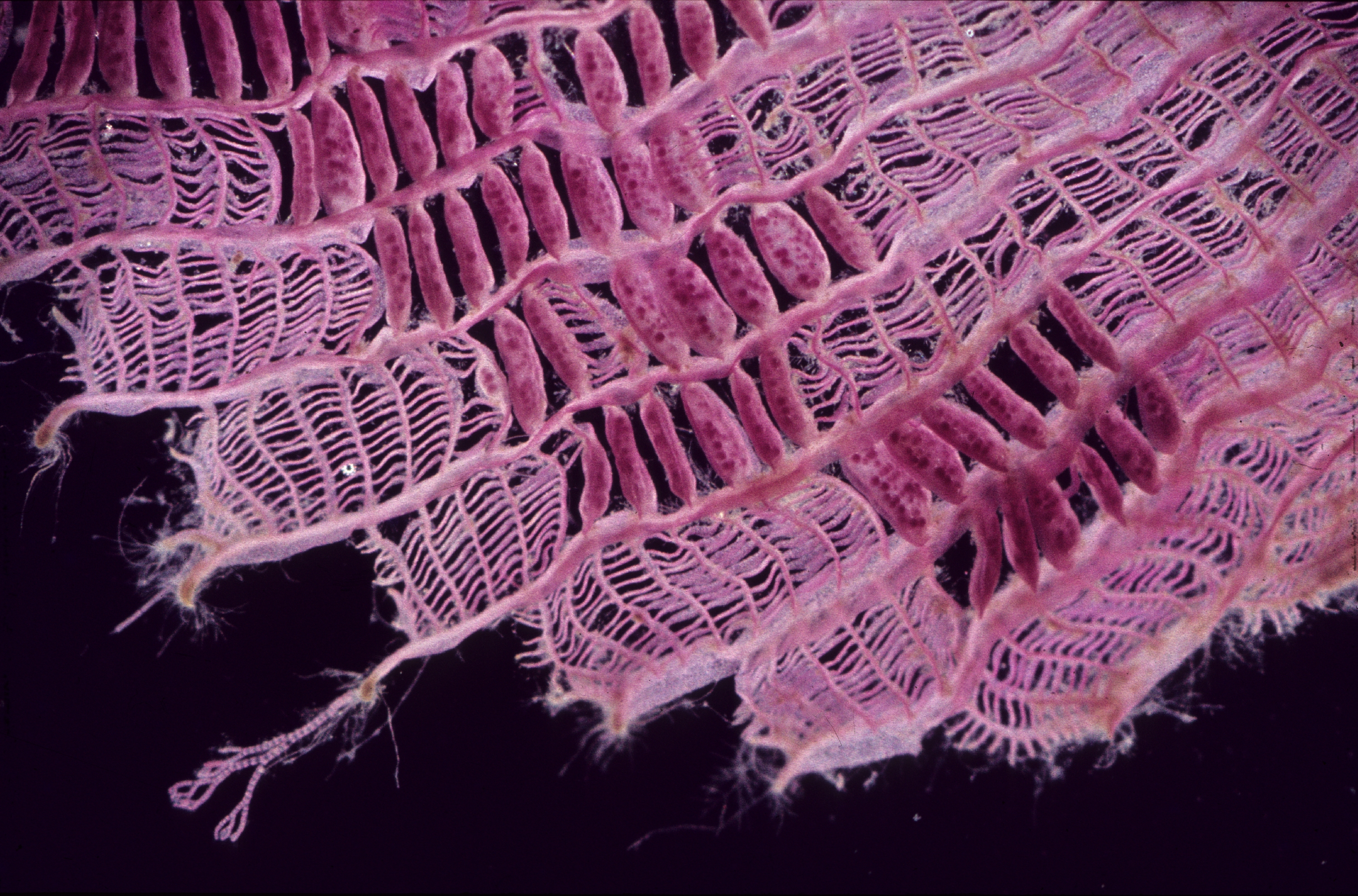
C. elegans tetrasporangia.
