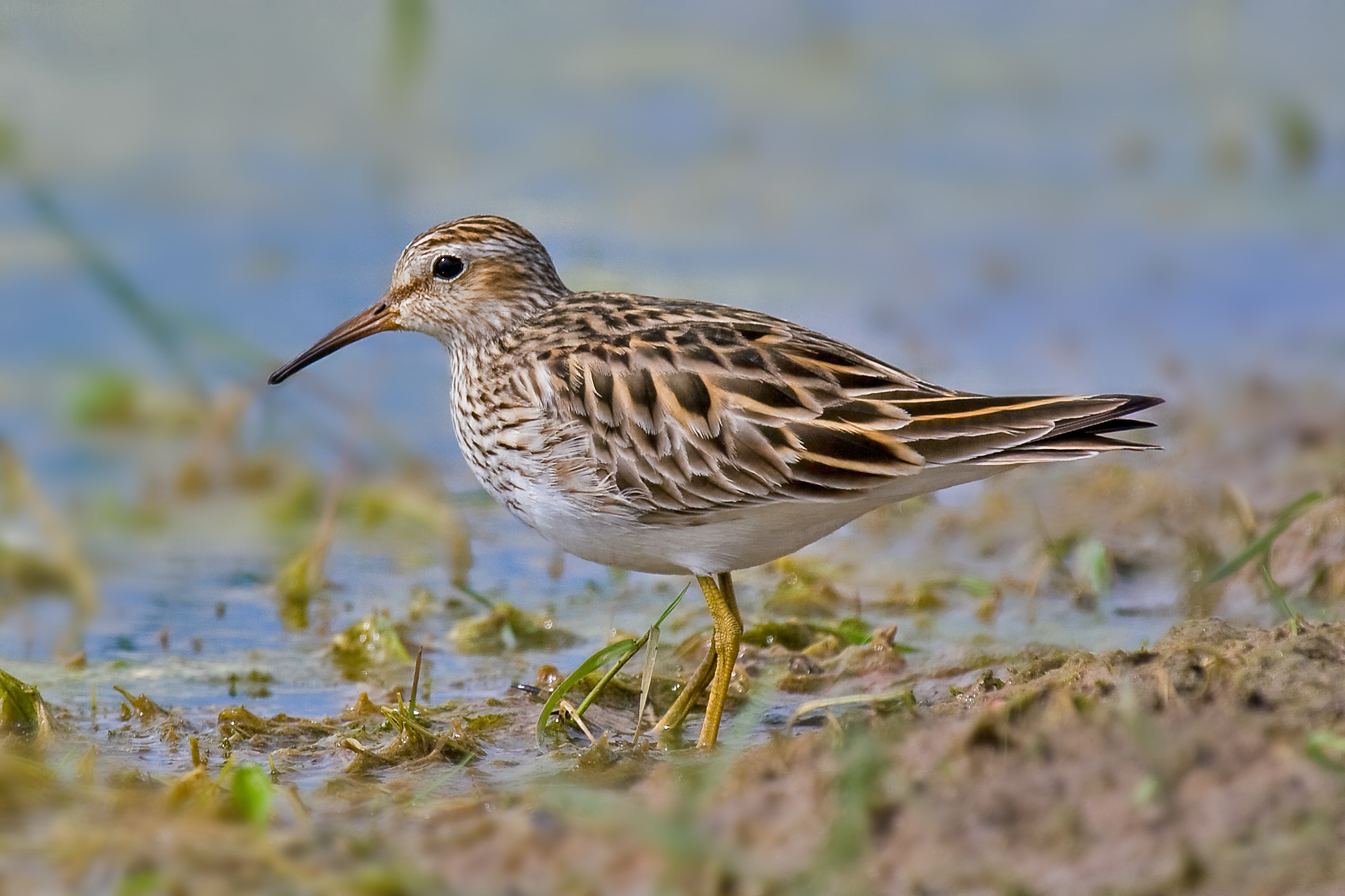
- Adult in breeding plumage

Conservation status
- Least Concern (IUCN 3.1)

Scientific classification
- Kingdom: Animalia
- Phylum: Chordata
- Class: Aves
- Order: Charadriiformes
- Family: Scolopacidae
- Genus: Calidris
- Species: C. melanotos

Binomial name
- Calidris melanotos (Vieillot, 1819)

Synonyms
- Actodromas maculata Erolia melanotos

= Pectoral sandpiper =

Species of bird

The pectoral sandpiper (Calidris melanotos), often abbreviated pec, is a small, migratory wader that breeds in arctic regions of North America and Asia, wintering in South America and Oceania. It eats small invertebrates. Its nest, a hole scraped in the ground and with a thick lining, is deep enough to protect its four eggs from the cool breezes of its breeding grounds. The pectoral sandpiper is 19–23 cm (7.5–9.1 in) long, with a wingspan of 38–46 cm (15–18 in).

== Taxonomy ==
In the past widely seen as most closely related to sharp-tailed sandpiper, more recent genetic evidence has shown more complex relationships between the species of Calidris, with its closest genetic relatives probably the semipalmated sandpiper and western sandpiper species pair.

Cox's sandpiper, originally described as a new species Calidris paramelanotos, has proven to be a stereotyped hybrid between this species and the curlew sandpiper. This does not prove a particularly close relationship between these two species, as far more distantly related waders have produced hybrids.

== Etymology ==
The scientific name is from Ancient Greek. The genus name kalidris or skalidris, is a term used by Aristotle for some grey-coloured waterside birds. The specific melanotos is from melas, "black" and notos, "backed".

== Description ==
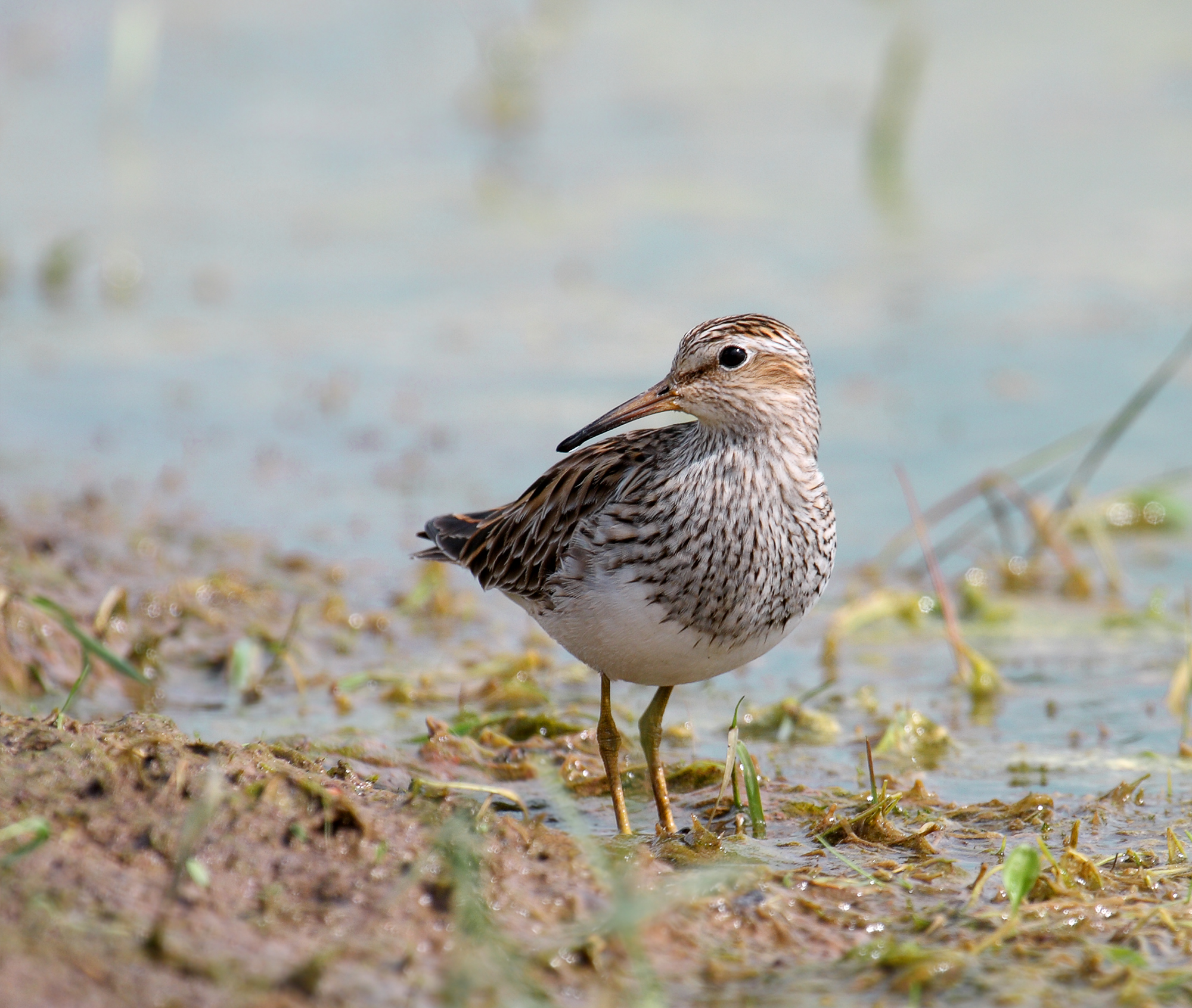
Adult in breeding plumage; note sharp margin of breast colour

This bird looks similar to the widely sympatric sharp-tailed sandpiper (C. acuminata), which is not however a member of the same clade in the genus. The pectoral sandpiper is a largish calidrid (19–23 cm (7.5–9.1 in) in length, with a wingspan of 37–46 cm (15–18 in)) with a grey-brown back, brownest in the summer male, and greyest in winter. The pectoral sandpiper has a grey breast, sharply demarcated at its lower edge, which gives this species its English name; this clear dividing line is particularly conspicuous if the birds are turned towards the observer. The legs are yellowish, and the bill is olive with a darker tip. The males are on average heavier than the females, but with much overlap; in breeding plumage, males also have a blacker breast spotted whitish.

The juveniles are more brightly patterned above with rufous coloration and white mantle stripes.

This species differs from the sharp-tailed sandpiper in its strong breast band pattern, weaker supercilium and browner, less rufous crown.

Standard measurements
length	19–23 cm (7.5–9.1 in)
wingspan	37–46 cm (15–18 in)
weight (male)	45–126 g (1.6–4.4 oz)
weight (female)	31–97 g (1.1–3.4 oz)
wing	136–142.8 mm (5.35–5.62 in)
tail	60.4–63.9 mm (2.38–2.52 in)
culmen	28.7–29.3 mm (1.13–1.15 in)
tarsus	27.8–30 mm (1.09–1.18 in)

== Distribution and ecology ==
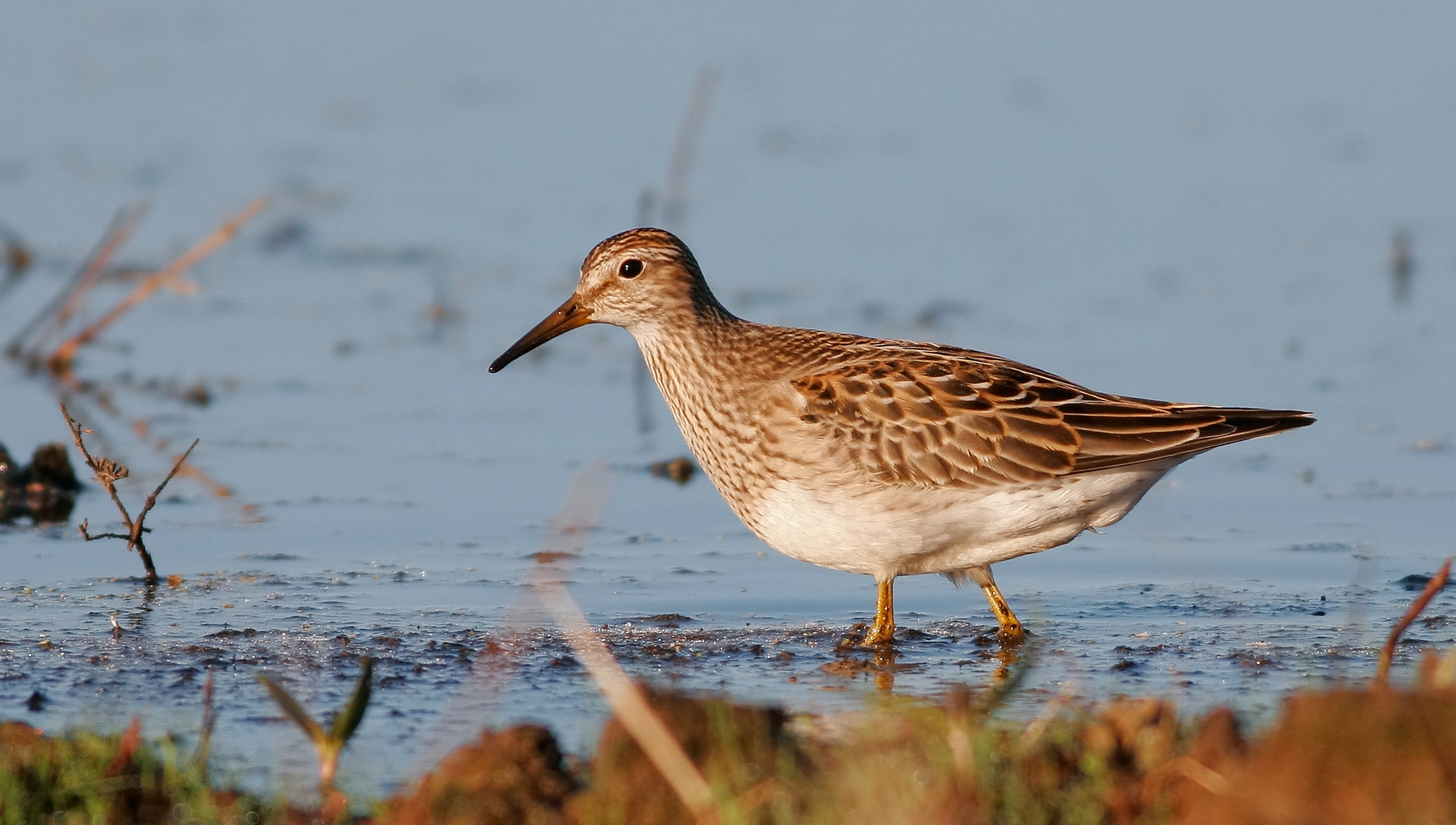
At Cosumnes River Preserve in Sacramento County, California.

It is a very long-distance migrant, and about half of the species breeds in the boggy tundra of northern Asia, the rest nesting in a range from Alaska to central Canada. The American and most of the Asian birds winter in South America, but some Asian breeders winter in southern and Australia and New Zealand. On migration and in winter, the pectoral sandpiper is typically found in freshwater habitats.

This species also occurs as a regular migrant to western Europe, being seen annually in Ireland and Great Britain. Pectoral sandpiper may rarely breed in Europe in the far north of European Russia and the far north of Norway; vagrant individuals were also found in Scotland in suitable breeding habitat during summer. Many of the birds occurring in Western Europe may be on a regular migration from Asian breeding grounds to winter in Southern Africa. September 2003 saw a record influx to those two countries, with 40 found in Ireland and 150 in Great Britain. On the US Pacific coast, such stagings of migrant flocks appear to be rarer. Vagrant individuals are sometimes seen elsewhere off the usual migration routes, e.g. on the Marianas, the Marshall Islands and Palau in Micronesia; they are somewhat more frequently encountered on the Hawaiian Islands.

The pectoral sandpiper's migration might be affected by global warming, as is suspected for many Arctic-breeding birds; 100 years ago, migrating pectoral sandpipers were observed to pass through northern Ohio in early-mid May and again in late August; today, the bulk of the northward migration takes place in April, and most birds do not return until mid-September.

These birds forage on grasslands and mudflats, picking up food by sight, sometimes by probing. They mainly eat arthropods (such as flies and their larvae, spiders and crustaceans) and other invertebrates, as well as seeds. The male has a courtship display which involves puffing up his breast, which has a fat sac in the breeding season to enhance his performance.

The pectoral sandpiper builds a steep-sided scrape nest with a considerable volume of lining material. The nest is deep enough that the eggs sit about 3 cm (1.2 in) below ground level, which helps to minimize heat loss from the cool breezes which occur at the latitudes where the species nests. The female lays four eggs.

Pectoral sandpipers have decreased in number 50% since 1974.
