= Jon Cox =

Jon Cox may refer to:

- Jon Cox (soccer)
- Jon Cox (politician)

== See also ==
- John Cox (disambiguation)
