= John Coxe =

John Coxe may refer to:

- Naukane (c. 1779–1850), Native Hawaiian chief who traveled widely through North America in the early 19th century
- John Redman Coxe (1773–1864), physician and professor of medicine at the University of Pennsylvania
- John Coxe (MP) (c. 1695–1783), English landowner and Member of Parliament

== See also ==
- John Cox (disambiguation)
