= Jack Cox =

Jack Cox may refer to:

== People ==
- Jack Cox (footballer) (1877–1955), English footballer
- Jack E. Cox (1896–1960), English cinematographer
- Jack Cox (Texas politician) (1921–1990), Texan politician and gubernatorial candidate

== Other uses ==
- Jack Cox (Scrubs), a fictional character in the TV comedy

== See also ==
- John Cox (disambiguation)
- Jackie Cox (disambiguation)
