= Sclerochiton preussii =

Conservation status
- Endangered (IUCN 3.1)

Scientific classification
- Kingdom: Plantae
- Clade: Tracheophytes
- Clade: Angiosperms
- Clade: Eudicots
- Clade: Asterids
- Order: Lamiales
- Family: Acanthaceae
- Genus: Sclerochiton
- Species: S. preussii

Binomial name
- Sclerochiton preussii (Lindau) C.B.Clarke

Species of flowering plant

Sclerochiton preussii is a species of plant in the family Acanthaceae. It is found in Cameroon and Nigeria. Its natural habitat is subtropical or tropical moist lowland forests.
