= John B. Cox =

British-Australian ornithologist

John B. Cox is a British-born ornithologist, who emigrated to Australia in 1968.

The hybrid shorebird Cox's sandpiper was named after him by Shane Parker.
