= Jackie Cox =

Jackie Cox may refer to:

- Jackie Cox (footballer) (1911–1990), Scottish football player and manager
- Jackie Cox (drag queen) (born 1985), the stage name of Darius Rose, an Iranian-Canadian drag queen

== See also ==
- Jack Cox (disambiguation)
