= Geococcus pusillus =

Scientific classification
- Kingdom: Plantae
- Clade: Tracheophytes
- Clade: Angiosperms
- Clade: Eudicots
- Clade: Rosids
- Order: Brassicales
- Family: Brassicaceae
- Genus: Geococcus; J.Drumm. ex Harv.
- Species: G. pusillus

Binomial name
- Geococcus pusillus J.Drumm. ex Harv.

Synonyms
- Geococcus fiedleri Scheuerm.

Species of flowering plant

Geococcus pusillus is a species of flowering plant in the family Brassicaceae. It is the sole species in genus Geococcus. It is native to southern and south-eastern Australia, including parts of Western Australia, South Australia, Victoria, New South Wales, and King Island in Tasmania.
