= George Clifton (plant collector) =

Englishman in Australia (1823–1913)

George Clifton (1823–1913) was an English collector of seaweed specimens, active in Australia.

Clifton was born in England, a son of Marshall Waller Clifton, and served in the Royal Navy. He emigrated to Australia in 1851, but returned in 1864, having served as a police officer, to become governor of the Portland and Dartmoor prisons.

He was employed by the state of Western Australia as superintendent of water police at Fremantle. Clifton assisted William Henry Harvey's work on algae of the region, and made use of his boat to make collections in the region. His contribution to Harvey's publication of Phycologia Australica is especially noted throughout that work; volume 5 is prefaced with the remarks,

"To George Clifton, Esq., R.N., of Fremantle, Western Australia, whose name occurs so frequently throughout the volume and in the synopsis, I am indebted for some thousands of beautifully preserved specimens, including many species collected by no one else. His contributions commenced in 1854, whilst I was resident in Western Australia, and have been regularly continued at short intervals up to the present time (Sept., .1863). Three new genera, Cliftonaea, Bindera, and Encyothalia, besides many new species, prove the zeal and success with which Mr. Clifton has conducted his researches."

His name is commemorated by Harvey in the epithets of the genus Cliftonia (later Cliftonaea a type of Algae, Harv. 1863 ), and a new species Dasya cliftoni. Clifton was known to have corresponded with Ferdinand von Mueller, but these letters are missing.
