= John Cocks (rugby union) =

- Full name: John Robert Cocks
- Born: 9 April 1936 (age 90) Sydney, NSW, Australia
- School: Barker College
- University: University of Melbourne

Rugby union career
- Position: Halfback
International career
| Years | Team | Apps | (Points) |
| 1958 | Australia | | |

John Robert Cocks (born 9 April 1936) is an Australian former international rugby union player.

Born in Sydney, Cocks captained the Barker College 1st XV and competed for the University of Melbourne while pursuing a medicine degree, earning Victorian and Combined Australian University representative honours.

Cocks was called up by the Wallabies in 1958 as the reserve halfback behind Des Connor for their tour of New Zealand, where he appeared in uncapped tour matches against Wanganui, Nelson, Southland and Manawatu.

A retired surgeon, Cocks was made a Fellow of the Royal College of Surgeons while working in England during the 1960s and later a Fellow of the Royal Australian College of Surgeons. He worked for many years at Box Hill Hospital.

Cocks became a successful masters swimmer and was the 2021 Masters Swimmer of the Year.

== See also ==
- List of Australia national rugby union players
