= Phycologia Australica =

Book by William Henry Harvey

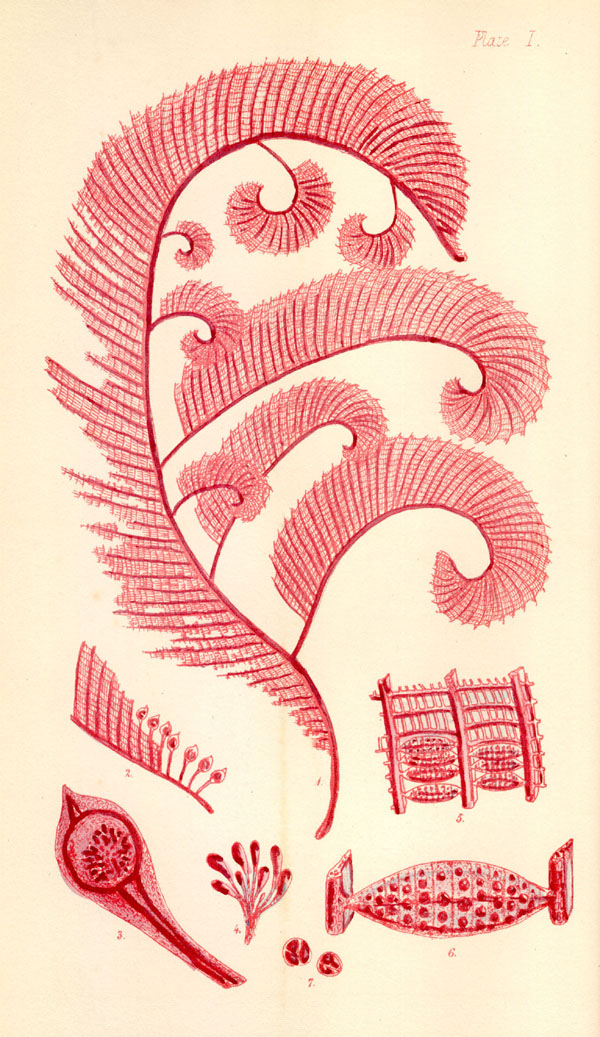
Plate 1: Claudea elegans

Phycologia Australica, written by William Henry Harvey, is one of the most important 19th-century works on phycology, the study of algae.

The work, published in five volumes between 1858 and 1863, is the result of Harvey's extensive collecting along the Australian shores during a three-year sabbatical. By the time Harvey set foot in Western Australia, he had already established himself as a leading phycologist, having published several large works on algae from the British Isles, northern America as well as the Southern Ocean (Nereis Australica). The fact that Harvey travelled the globe on several occasions and collected the seaweeds which he described himself in his later publications, set him apart from most of his contemporaries who relied for the most part on specimens collected by others. In addition, Harvey's zest for work meant he pressed sometimes over 700 specimens in a single day, which were distributed to his colleagues a set of Australian algae. Upon his return to Trinity College in Dublin, Harvey embarked on a mission: the illustration and description of over 300 species of Australian algae, for which he earned the title "father of Australian Phycology".

The dedications and specific epithets of the species commemorate his friend George Clifton, of Fremantle, who assisted Harvey as a collector.
