= William McCalla =

Irish scientist (1814–1849)

- Born: 1814
- Died: 1849 (aged 34–35)
- Occupation: botanist

William McCalla (1814–1849) was an Irish naturalist.

McCalla lived in Roundstone, County Galway, where he was a schoolmaster. He is associated with many areas of natural history and had a private museum. His bird records are frequently mentioned in the Natural History of Ireland by William Thompson.

He worked as a plant specimens collector for David Moore, John Scouler and Thomas Coulter.

McCalla collected algae and flowering plants, his records are included in Harvey's Phycologia Britannica. His specimens are in the Ulster Museum and Trinity College Dublin.

He was the discoverer in 1835 of Erica mackaiana, which he transmitted to Mackay. This plant is found only in Roundstone district (Ireland) and the mountains of Castile and Asturia. The seaweed Cladophora macallana (now referred to as Cladophora lehmanniana (Lindenberg) Kützing) was named after him by William Henry Harvey.

McCalla's algal collection in the Ulster Museum includes two albums with 75 specimens in volume I (museum catalogue numbers: F10368 - F10442) and 50 specimens in volume II (Museum catalogue numbers: F10443 - F10492) along with two lichen specimens. Many of the algal specimens are from Roundstone Bay, County Galway.

An account of his life and career is given by Tim Robinson in Connemara:Listening to the Wind.

William McCalla was recognized for his publication, Algae Hibernicae, in 1845, by the Royal Dublin society, by a silver award medal.

He edited the exsiccatae Algae Hibernicae. Volume I and Algae Hibernicae. Volume II (1848).
