= Shane Parker (ornithologist) =

British-born Australian curator and ornithologist

Shane Alwyne Parker (3 August 1943 – 21 November 1992) was a British-born museum curator and ornithologist, who emigrated to Australia in 1967 after participating in the second Harold Hall Australian ornithological collecting expedition in 1964. He worked as a curator at the South Australian Museum 1976–1992. He died of lymphoma at his home in Adelaide after a two-year illness.

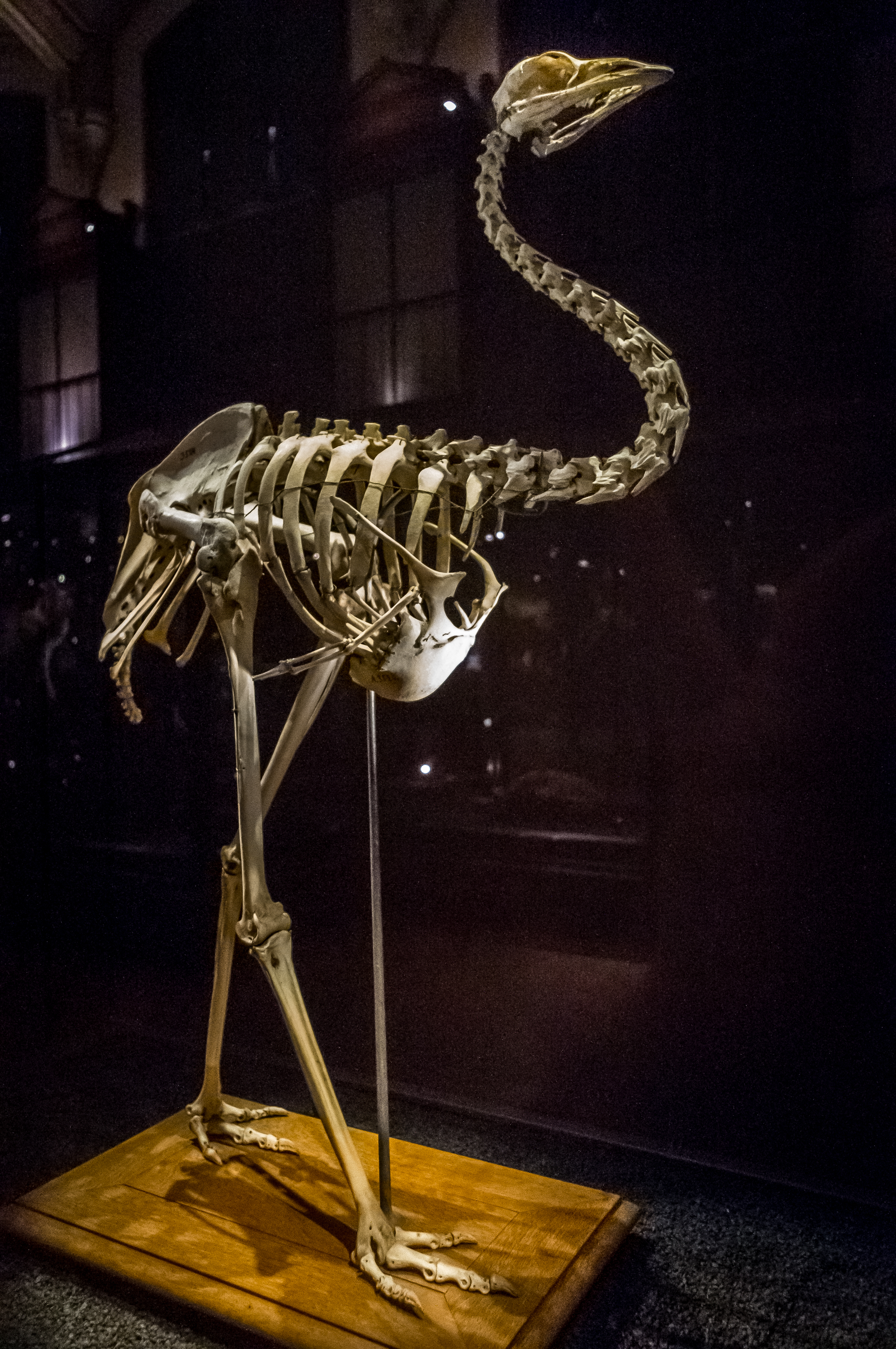
Skeleton of Kangaroo Island emu (Dromaius novaehollandiae baudinianus), named by Parker.

Parker described Cox's sandpiper as a species new to science in 1982; this wader was later revealed to be a hybrid. He also named the extinct Kangaroo Island emu (Dromaius baudinianus) in 1984 on the basis of subfossil bones. He was the senior author of the first two parts (all that were published) of the Annotated Checklist of the Birds of South Australia, Part 1: Emus to Spoonbills (1979), and Part 2A: Waterfowl (1985).
