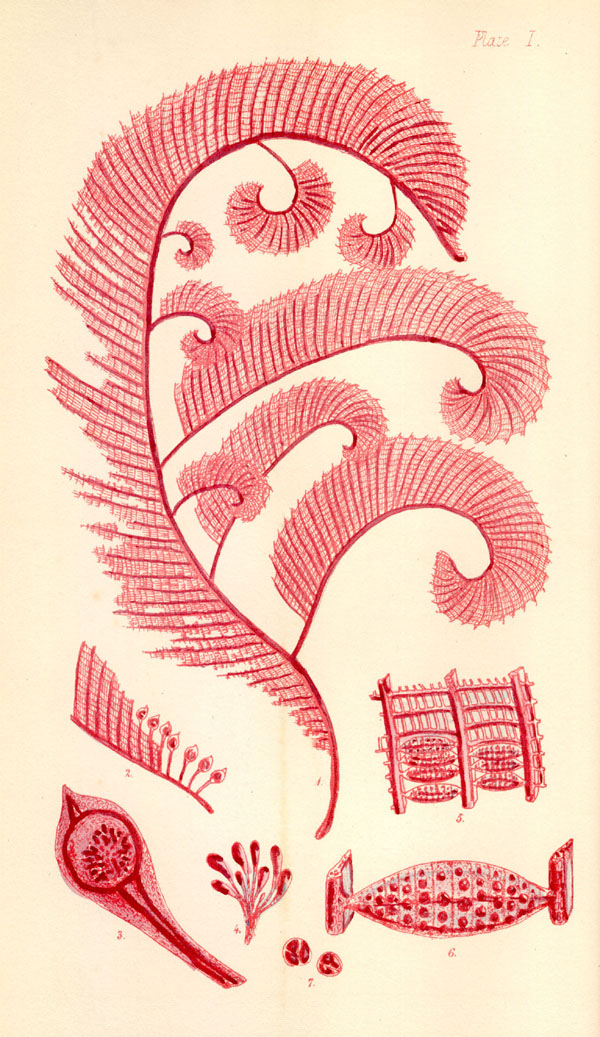
- Claudea elegans

Scientific classification
- Domain: Eukaryota
- Clade: Archaeplastida
- Division: Rhodophyta
- Class: Florideophyceae
- Order: Ceramiales
- Family: Delesseriaceae
- Genus: Claudea; J.V. Lamouroux

Species
- Claudea batanensis Tanaka; Claudea elegans J.V.Lamouroux; Claudea multifida Harvey

= Claudea =

Genus of algae

Claudea is a marine red alga genus.

== Taxonomy and Nomenclature ==
The genus was named for Claude Lamouroux, father of Jean Vincent Félix Lamouroux. Claude was born in Agen in 1741.

The genus of Claudea was circumscribed by Jean Vincent Félix Lamouroux in Ann. Mus. Natl. Hist. Nat. vol.20 on page 121 in 1813.

== Species ==
Currently there are 4 species in the Algaebase, where Claudea bennettiana Harvey is considered as homotypic or heterotypic species. Claudea elegans J.V.Lamouroux is the holotype species.

- Claudea batanensis Tanaka
- Claudea bennettiana Harvey
- Claudea elegans J.V.Lamouroux
- Claudea multifida Harvey

== Morphology ==
According to the description presented in electronic flora of South Australia, "the thallus was described with net-like fronds, the stipes can be long or short developed from the midrib of the nets. The holdfast was described to be discoid to conical pseudoparenchymatous; epilithic or epiphytic. The apices of fronds formed a dome-shaped apical cell segmenting to give an axial filament, where each cell contains 4 pericentral cells (2 lateral cells cut off first followed by 2 transverse pericentral cells), lateral pericentral cells developing second-order rows with their inner cells forming third-order rows, with all second and third-order rows reaching the blade margin; fourth-order rows occasionally present marginally. The lateral pericentral cells develop wings 1–2 mm broad. The upper (adaxial) transverse pericentral cells each produce a secondary blade with similar apical development, of which each adaxial transverse pericentral cell produces a row of cells which connect to the lower (abaxial) transverse pericentral cells of the secondary frond above, with all cells except the apical adherent one developing flat blades as in primary and secondary axes. These tertiary blades and their interstices form the network of the fronds and similar branching of the tertiary blades forms quaternary blades with smaller networks. Cortication of the axes commences some distance below the apices and becomes thick on lower axes from which the wings are lost."

== Distribution ==
A genus with 3 recognized species, the C. multifida was collected by Harvey from the northern Indian Ocean and reported also Andaman Island, India, Sri Lanka, Philippines, China, Taiwan and Federated States of Micronesia. The C. batanensis specimens were reported from South-east Asia: Philippines, Vietnam and Asian region particularly in South China Sea, and Taiwan.

== Ecology ==
Based on Tanaka (1967) the C. batanensis grows on the tube of Polychaete associated with other algae like Acanthophora aokii Okamura in rather deep sea.

== Life history/Reproduction ==
Based from the electronic flora of South Australia, “the gametophytes is dioecious. Procarps (in C. multifida) borne on abaxial transverse pericentral cells, usually on successive cells, with 2 sterile groups and a 4-celled carpogonial branch. Carposporophyte with a basal fusion cell, much branched gonimoblast, and clavate to ovoid terminal carposporangia. Cystocarps dome-shaped to ovoid, borne singly on distinct pedicels; pericarp ostiolate, corticate. Spermatangial sori formed on tertiary or quaternary blades, with sterile midribs and margins, with initials cut off from second- and third-order rows producing an outer layer of spermatangia.”

Tetrasporangial sori formed on tertiary and quaternary blades, with tetrasporangia cut off from second-order cells in a single (or displaced to two) layer (from cortical cells also in C. multifida), with cover cells on each side of the blade dividing to form a continuous cortical layer; tetrasporangia subspherical, tetrahedrally divided.

== Other notes ==
Exploitation/harvesting/cultivation: Although considered in literature as rare, no cultivation of the genus was recorded Chemical composition/natural products chemistry: No available literature on the chemical composition of the three species within the genus.

== Other sources ==
- Harvey, W.H. (1854). New Algae from Ceylon. Journ. Bot. (Hooker) 6, 143–145, Plates 5–6.
- Papenfuss, G.F. (1937). The structure and reproduction of Claudea multifida, Vanvoorstia spectabilis and Vanvoorstia coccinea. Synth. Bot. Upsal. 2(4): 1–66.
- Tanaka, T. (1967). Some marine algae from Batan and Camiguin Islands, Northern Philippines — I. Mem. Fac. Fish. Kagoshima Univ. 16, 13–27.
