= John W. Cox (Minnesota politician) =

American politician (1888–1958)

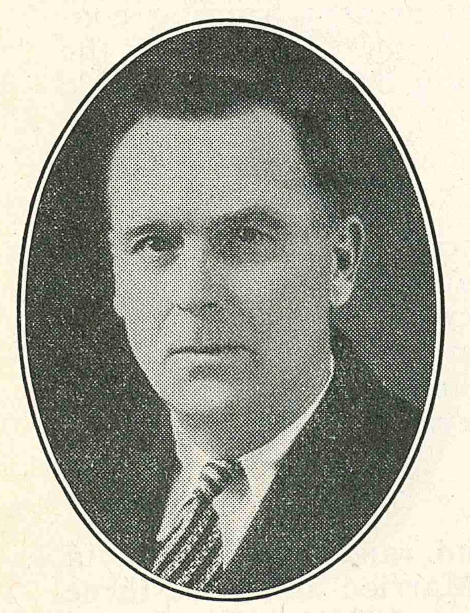

Member of the Minnesota House of Representatives from the 55th district
- In office January 8, 1935 – January 2, 1939

Personal details
- Born: March 14, 1888 Becker, Minnesota, U.S.
- Died: September 8, 1958 (aged 70)
- Party: Democratic (DFL)
- Children: 6
- Occupation: Politician, farmer, businessman

John W. Cox (March 14, 1888 – September 8, 1958) was an American politician, farmer, and businessman who served in the Minnesota House of Representatives from 1935 to 1939, representing the 55th legislative district of Minnesota in the 49th and 50th Minnesota Legislatures.

== Early life and education ==
Cox was born in Becker, Minnesota, on March 14, 1888. He attended common schools in Minnesota, as well as business school.

== Career ==
Cox served on the Becker Consolidated School Board, as well as the Becker Township Board of Supervisors.

Cox served in the Minnesota House of Representatives from 1935 to 1939, representing the 55th legislative district of Minnesota in the 49th and 50th Minnesota Legislatures.

During his time in office, Cox served on the following committees:

- Agriculture and Horticulture (1935–1938)
- Corporations (1935–1938)
- Drainage (1935–1936)
- Education (1935–1938)
- Elections (1935–1936)
- Military Affairs (1935–1936)
- State Development and Immigration (1935–1936)
- Civil Administration (1937–1938)
- Cooperatives and Cooperation (1937–1938)
- Dairy Products and Livestock (1937–1938)
- Public Highways (1937–1938)
- Public Welfare and Social Legislation (1937–1938)
- Towns and Counties (1937–1938)

Cox chaired the Cooperatives and Cooperation committee during his second term.

Cox's time in office began on January 8, 1935, and concluded on January 2, 1939. His district included representation for the counties of Kanabec, Mille Lacs, and Sherburne.

Outside of the Minnesota Legislature, Cox was a farmer and the owner of a flour mill.

== Personal life and death ==
Cox was married and had six children. He resided in Becker, Minnesota.

According to family members, Cox was a member of the Democratic–Farmer–Labor Party.

Cox died at the age of 70 on September 8, 1958.

Minnesota House of Representatives
Preceded by —	Member of the Minnesota House of Representatives from the 55th district 1935–1939	Succeeded by —
