= John Cocke (politician) =

American politician (1828–1909)

John Cocke (December 5, 1828 - September 26, 1909) was a state legislator in Mississippi. He represented Panola County, Mississippi in the Mississippi House of Representatives in 1872 and 1873.

He was born in Tennessee. He was married to Olive Cocke and willed his homestead to her and his granddaughter Sarah O. Nelson.

== See also ==
- African American officeholders from the end of the Civil War until before 1900
