= John Cox (cricketer) =

Australian cricketer

Personal information
- Full name: John Cox
- Born: 6 August 1823; Longford, Tasmania, Australia
- Died: 30 November 1866 (aged 43); Invercargill, Southland, New Zealand
- Batting: Right-handed
- Bowling: Right-arm fast-medium

Domestic team information
- Years: Team
- 1853/54: Victoria
- 1851/52–1857/58: Tasmania

Career statistics
Competition	First-class
Matches	3
Runs scored	32
Batting average	6.40
100s/50s	–/–
Top score	15
Balls bowled	–
Wickets	–
Bowling average	–
5 wickets in innings	–
10 wickets in match	–
Best bowling	–
Catches/stumpings	–/–
- Source: Cricinfo, 2 January 2011

John Cox (6 August 1823 – 30 November 1866) was an Australian cricket player, who played first class cricket for Tasmania and Victoria.

== See also ==
- List of Tasmanian representative cricketers
