= John Mark Cox Jr. =

American activist in Florida during the civil rights movement

John Mark Cox Jr. was the first African American to attend Rollins College, Florida's oldest college.

In 1964, Cox was admitted to Rollins College, a liberal arts college in central Florida. He was the first African-American student admitted to the college during the civil rights movement. At Rollins, Cox saw himself as a pioneer, beginning a new chapter in the history of the school, which was founded in 1885. Cox took a three-year break from Rollins in 1966, returning in 1969.

Cox is the son of a doctor who helped advance the Florida Southern Hospital to the top two out of fifteen in the Central Florida area. His mother, head of Economic Opportunity, Inc., ran 14 preschools for children from underprivileged backgrounds. Cox had two younger siblings, both of whom attended school: his brother Alfred enrolled in Columbia Union College (now Washington Adventist University). His youngest sister Edith Elaine graduated from Barry Law School and became a state attorney prosecutor.

Cox advocated for civil rights. In 1971, he made an address to a crowd on how happy he was to see formerly impossible developments become reality.
