= Johncock =

Johncock is a surname of British origin. People so named include:

- Gordon Johncock (born 1936), American racing driver
- Graham Johncock (born 1982), Australian rules footballer
- Rachel Johncock (born 1993), Welsh sprinter
- Brian Johnson (special effects artist) (born 1939), British special effects artist born Brian Johncock
