= John Watson Cox =

New Zealand lawyer and town planning administrator

John Watson Cox (16 September 1902–20 October 1984) was a New Zealand lawyer and town planning administrator. He was born in Taupiri, Waikato, New Zealand on 16 September 1902.
