= Isabella Gifford =

Marine botanist (b. 1825, d. 1891)

- Born: 1825; Defynnog, Brecknockshire, Wales, U.K.
- Died: 1891 (aged 65–66)
- Parent(s): Isabella Christie and Captain George St. John Gifford

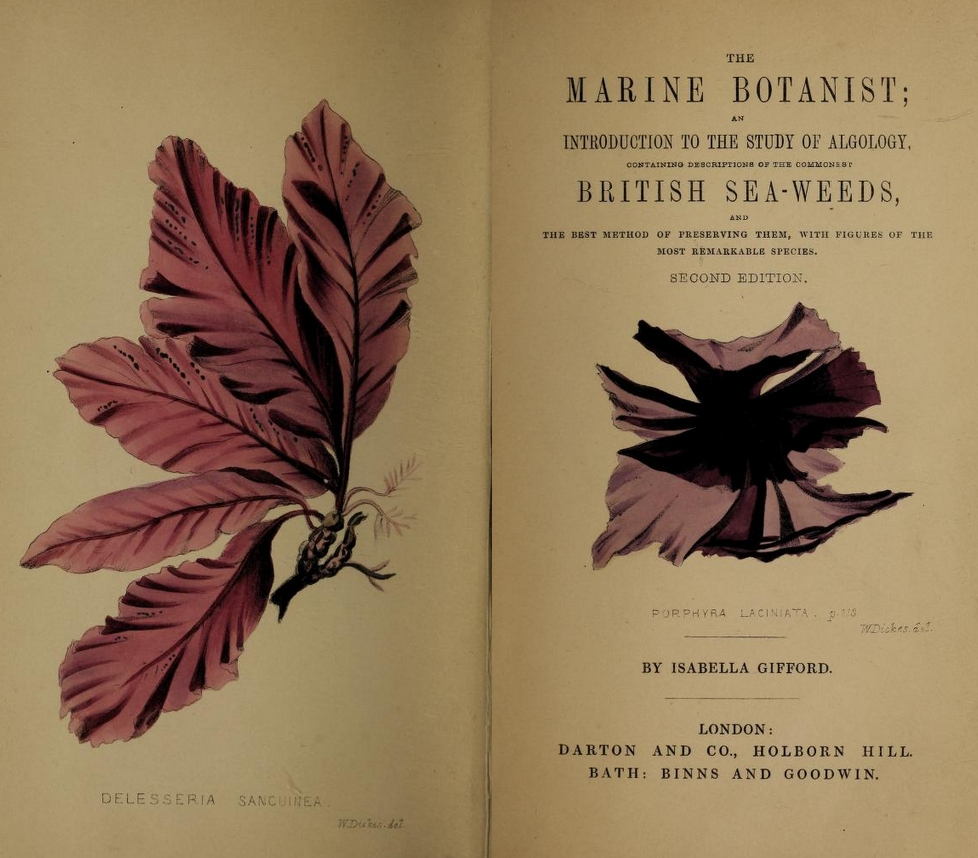
Title page of The Marine Botanist. A book by Isabella Gifford, 1848

Isabella Gifford (1825–1891) was a British botanist. In 1848, she published The Marine Botanist, a book which focuses on algology. Some of her specimens are in the Ulster Museum.

== Biography ==
Isabella Gifford was born at Defynnog, Brecknockshire, Wales, in 1825. She was the first child of Isabella Christie and Captain George St John Gifford, who were married the year before.

She lived in France, Jersey, and for a time at Falmouth before settling with her parents in Minehead, Somerset, around 1850.

Gifford seems to have been mostly self-taught as a scientist with a variety of family links to science. Her uncles included Dr Thomas Southwood Smith and Richard Cowling Taylor.

== Studies in botany ==
Isabella Gifford was primarily an algologist, studying algae.

In 1848 she published The Marine Botanist; an introduction to the study of algology, containing descriptions of the commonest British sea-weeds. According to the Journal of Botany, this 1848 study of British seaweeds was "well received".

She contributed to the proceedings of the Somerset Archaeological and Natural History Society in 1851.

Though she primarily studied algae, Gifford's primary legacy is her collections of vascular plants and mosses, many of which are now contained within museums including Bolton Museum and Art Gallery and St Andrews University Botany Department.
