= John Cocks (phycologist) =

British phycologist (1787–1861)

- Born: 1787
- Died: 1861 (aged 73–74)
- Occupation: Phycologist
- Known for: Discovery of Stenogramme interrupta

John Cocks (1787–1861) was a British phycologist.

He was the first to discover the red algae Stenogramme interrupta, on 21 Oct 1846.

Cocks edited the exsiccata Algarum fasciculi, or, a collection of British seaweeds, carefully dried and preserved, and correctly named after Dr. Harvey's "Phycologia Britannica", with a description of each plant, time of appearance, locality, etc.. The first fascicle was published in Dublin 1855, the others from 1856 to 1860 in Plymouth.

The standard author abbreviation Cocks is used to indicate this person as the author when citing a botanical name.
