= William Henry Harvey =

Irish botanist

William Henry Harvey FRS
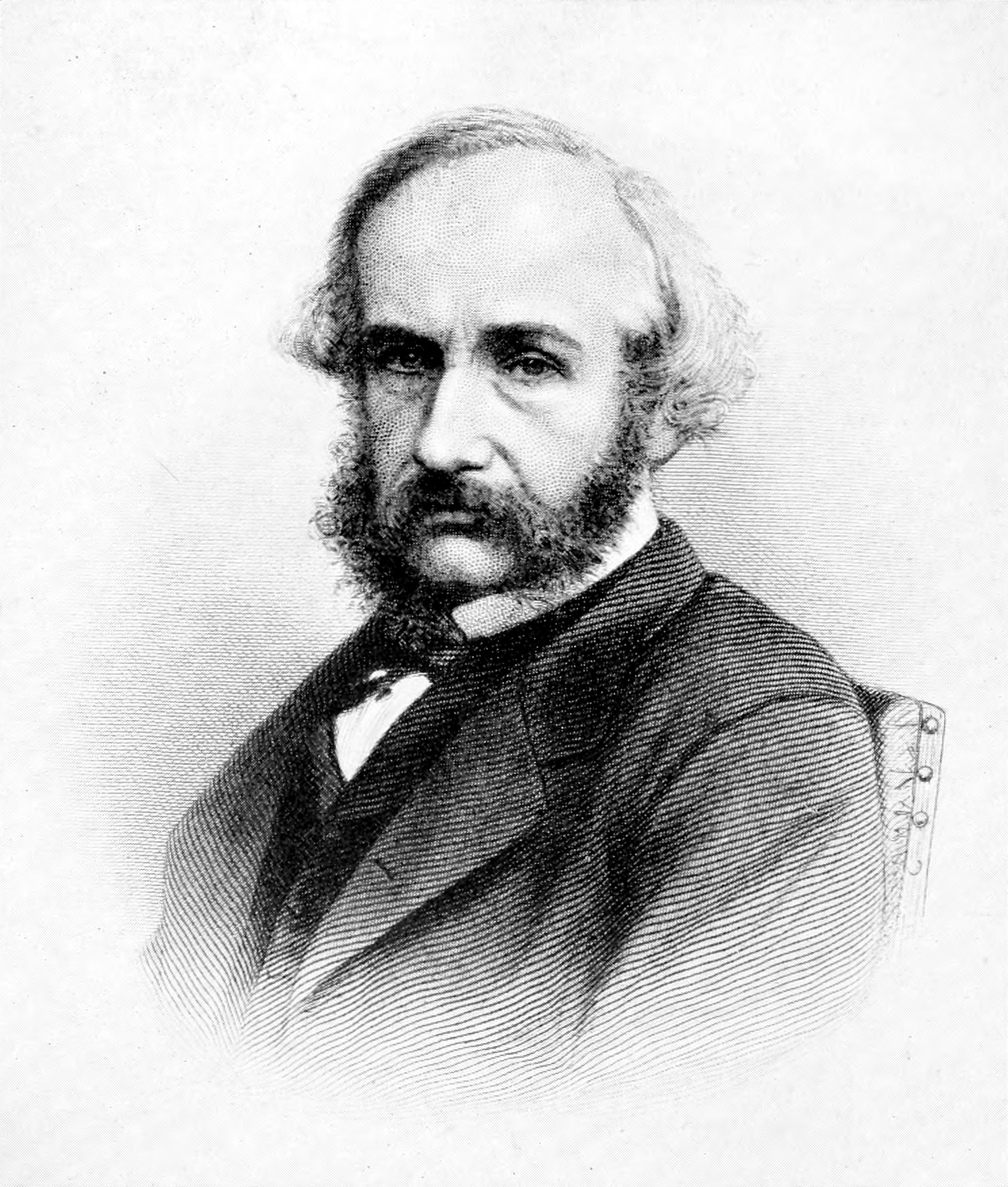
- Born: 5 February 1811; Limerick, County Limerick, Ireland
- Died: 15 May 1866 (aged 55); Torquay, Devon, England
- Other name: W.H Harvey
- Known for: A Manual of the British Algae
- Spouse: Miss Phelps (m 1861)
- Scientific career
- Fields: Botanist
- Author abbrev. (botany): Harv.

William Henry Harvey, FRS FLS (5 February 1811 – 15 May 1866) was an Irish botanist and phycologist who specialised in algae.

== Biography ==
Harvey was born at Summerville near Limerick, Ireland, in 1811, the youngest of 11 children. His father Joseph Massey Harvey, was a Quaker and prominent merchant. William started his education at Ballitore School in County Kildare and by the age of 15 had already established algae as his over-riding interest. After leaving school he joined the family business.

Harvey was an authority on algae and bryophytes (mosses), and author of A Manual of the British Algae (1841), Phycologia Britannica (4 vols., 1846–51), Nereis Boreali-Americana. (3 parts 1852–85) and Phycologia Australica (5 vol., 1858–63). He spent several years in South Africa, and was the author, with German botanist Otto Wilhelm Sonder, of the Flora Capensis (7 vol. in 11, 1859 – 1933). Harvey's main algal herbarium is located at Trinity College Dublin.

Harvey's discovery in 1831 of the moss Hookeria laetevirens at Killarney, new to Ireland, led to a lifelong friendship with Sir William Jackson Hooker, who was then Regius Professor of Botany at Glasgow University. Hooker recognised the talent of the young man and lent him books and specimens. Soon afterwards Hooker invited him to contribute the section on algae to his British Flora (1833) as well as the section on algae for The Botany of Captain Beechy's Voyage.

In 1835 Harvey went to South Africa aboard the vessel "Carnatic", with his brother Joseph, who had been mistakenly nominated as colonial treasurer by Thomas Spring Rice instead of William. When Joseph's health failed in the following year, William took over his duties. They left for Britain together on 14 April 1836 and Joseph died on the voyage.

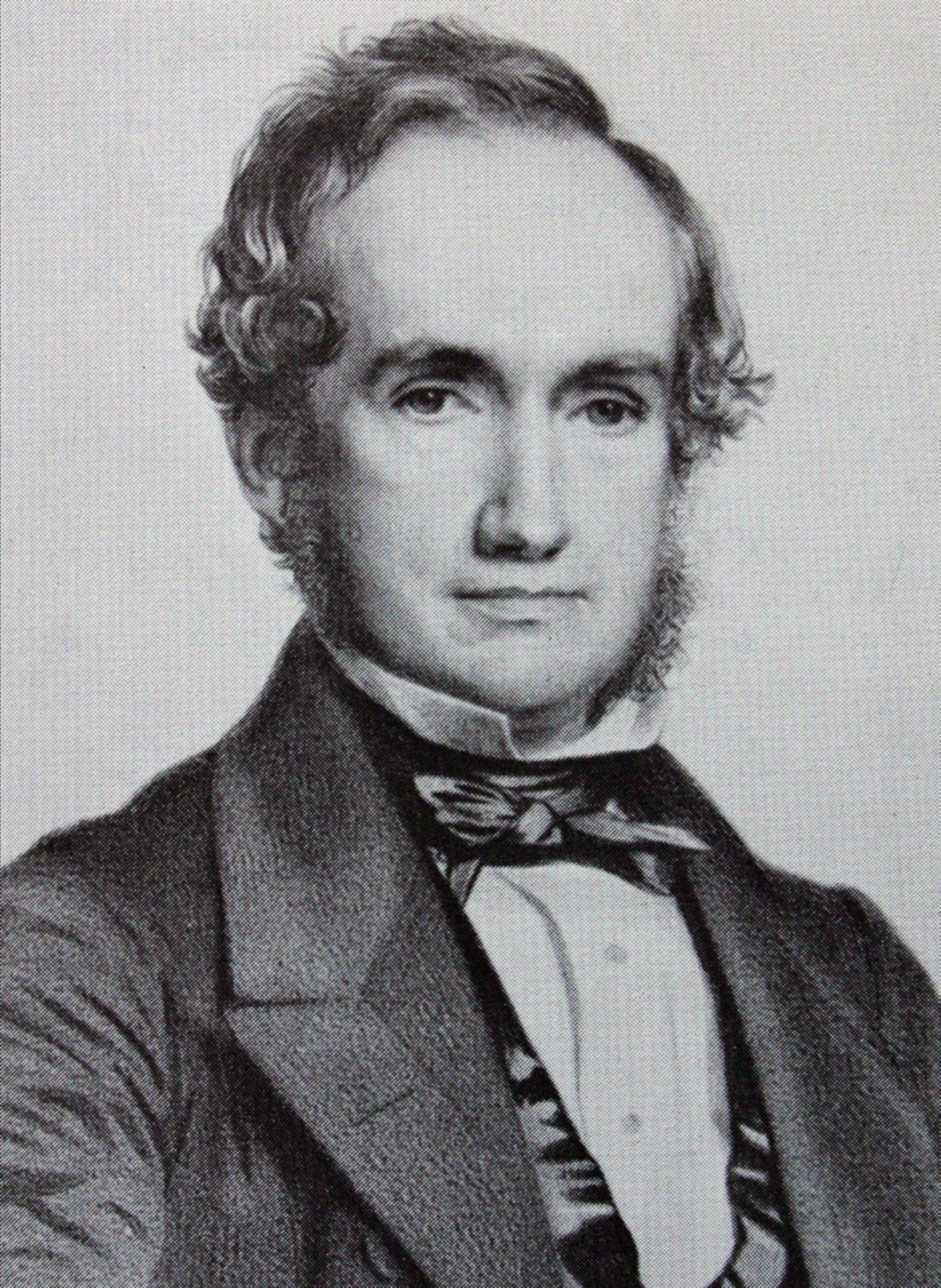

Back in Cape Town, and now officially treasurer-general, William took up residence at Bishop's Court, rising before dawn every day, collecting in the mountains or sea-shore, and working on the plants at night. In March 1837 he wrote: 'I have taken so many excursions lately that I almost fear I shall earn the sobriquet of Her Majesty's pleasurer general'. In the same year he enlisted the services of botanical collector Karl Zeyher, who was in Uitenhage, to collect specimens. He developed a close friendship with Baron von Ludwig who had started his famous gardens in Cape Town, and dedicated his Genera of South African Plants to him. Under the patronage of Sir George Grey and with the assistance of a team of collectors and of Otto Wilhelm Sonder, he set about writing a Flora Capensis in English – he lived long enough to see the first three volumes completed and published in Dublin, the third in 1865. He came home in 1842, having resigned his position due to illness.

In 1844 Harvey became curator of the Trinity College Herbarium (TCD) and in 1848 Professor of Botany of the Royal Dublin Society.

In 1853 he made a three-year voyage, visiting South Africa, Ceylon, Australia, New Zealand, Tonga, Fiji, and Chile. On his return he published further important books dealing with the botany of North America and South Africa and in 1858 was appointed Professor of Botany at Trinity College Dublin.

He died from tuberculosis on 15 May 1866 at Torquay and was buried there.

== Botanic works ==
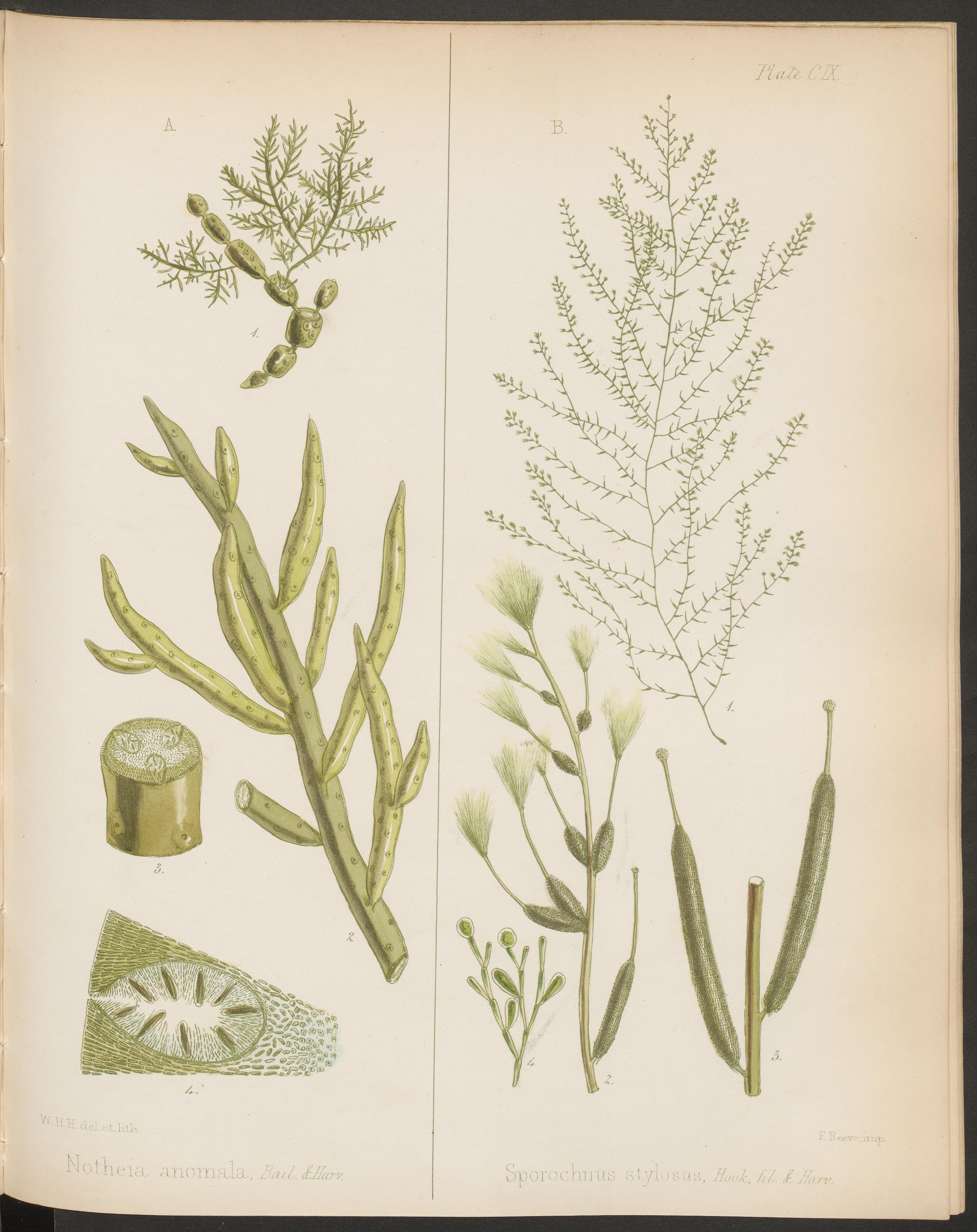
Illustrations made by William Henry Harvey in 1855, including Notheia anomala (top left)

As a result of the publication of his 1858 book, The genera of South African plants, in which he asked South African readers to send him specimens so that he could begin documenting the flora of the Cape, he began a correspondence with Mary Elizabeth Barber, an amateur naturalist who lived in Cape Colony. Their ongoing correspondence took place during a time when it was not generally accepted for women to engage in scientific discussion; indeed, in the beginning Barber did not disclose the fact that she was a woman. Barber became one of Harvey's main suppliers of plants from South Africa and also assisted him in the naming and classification of numerous species. Over a nearly 30-year correspondence, she sent Harvey approximately 1,000 species with notes on each one.

Harvey described over 750 species and in excess of 75 genera of algae.

His Phycologia Britannica was published in 1846–1851 and his publication of Nereis Australis Or Algae of the Southern Ocean (1847–49) along with other publications established his reputation. His Phycologia Australica represents one of the most important books on phycology in the 19th century. Published in five volumes between 1858 and 1863 it is the result of his extensive collecting on the Australian shores.

By the time Harvey set foot in Western Australia he had already established himself as a leading phycologist having published several large works. He earned the title: "father of Australian Phycology". He was elected as a Fellow of the Royal Society in 1858.

== Legacy ==
About 600 specimens from Ireland, Ceylon, Friendly Islands, Australia and Tasmania collected by Harvey are in store in the Ulster Museum Herbarium (BEL), almost 90 of which are in the 5th volume of the William Thompson collection in the Ulster Museum, catalogue numbers: F8848–F8937. However his primary collection is still in the TCD Herbarium attached to Botany School building of Trinity College. There are also collections of Harvey's specimens in: The former botany department of University College, Cork, Ireland; West Chester, Pennsylvania, US; National Herbarium of Victoria (MEL), Melbourne, Australia; National Herbarium of New South Wales (NSW), Sydney, Australia and the Herbarium of St. Andrews University (STA). In 1858 he edited three exsiccata series: Australian Algae, Ceylon Algae and Friendly Island Algae. The exsiccata specimens are deposited in several herbaria.

In Harvey's era naturalists often relied upon the exchanging of specimens with other scientists and contributions by amateur collectors. His 1841 Manual of the British Algae was dedicated to British beachcomber, Amelia Griffiths. In his Phycologia Britannica Harvey often notes the "distribution" of each species giving the name of the collector who reported the record. In the Preface of Vol. 1 he lists 19 people to whom he is indebted. These include: Rev Pollexfen and Dr McBain for Orkney algae. The others are: Rev Hore, Dr Cocks, Mr Rohloff, Mr Boswarva, Miss White, Miss Magdalene Turner, Miss Warren, Miss (Anne) Ball, Miss (Isabella) Gifford(4), Miss Cutler (1), Mrs Gatty, Mrs Gulson (?–1871)(5), Mrs Hayden, Rev Dr Landsborough, Dr Dickie (2), Mr Ralfs and Mr Cresswell. Others noted in volume 1 include: Mr Winch, Mr McCalla (c.1814–1849)(3), Mr Wigg, Mr Borrer, Miss Hutchins, Mr John Templeton, Mr T.N.Cole, Rev Clouston, Rev H. Davies, Mr Stackhouse, Mrs Ovens, Mr W. Backhouse, Dr James, Dr. P. Neill and others. Harvey recognised Turner's help and named Cladophora magdalenae Harv. in her honour. Harvey also honoured Susan Fereday's contribution to his work by naming the species Dasya feredayae and Nemastoma feredayae after her.

This botanist is denoted by the author abbreviation Harv. when citing a botanical name.

== Specimens in Ulster Museum Herbarium (BEL) ==
Specimens of some of these collectors are to be found in the Ulster Museum Herbarium (BEL):

1. Miss Cutler: BEL catalogue numbers:— F5646; F5400; F5399; F5358; F5336; F5335 and F5511.
2. Professor George Dickie (1812–1882): BEL catalogue numbers:— F2651; F2462 and F2696.
3. William McCalla many specimens in Ulster Museum.
4. Miss Isabella Gifford (1823?–1891): BEL catalogue numbers:— Ulster Museum Collection No. 15.
5. Mrs Gulson (?–1871): BEL catalogue numbers:— F5369; F5419; F5410; F5370; F5737; F5522; F5810; F5810; F5737; F5713; F5523; F5522; F5506; F5720; F5719; F5410; F5401 and F5369.

== Other collectors ==
George Clifton (1823–1913) Mr G. Clifton is mentioned in Harvey's Memoirs, as the superintendent of the Water Police in Perth, West Australia whose boat Harvey used when collecting in Fremantle (Blackler, 1977). Some of his specimens are in the Ulster Museum Herbarium: BEL: F2195; F2196 from "W.Australia."

Ronald Campbell Gunn (1808–1881) Harvey's specimens in the Ulster Museum are from George Town. The handwriting has been determined by Dr H. B. S. Womersley (1980): F2256; F2242; F2083; F2081 and others.

Harvey was an honorary M.D. of Dublin University (1844) and F.R.S. (1858). His portrait is in the National Gallery of Ireland, Dublin.

== Harvey's publications ==
- Harvey, William Henry. 1833. Div.II. Confervoideae. Div.III. Gloiocladeae. In, Hooker, W.J. (Ed.) The English flora of Sir James Edward Smith 5. London.
- Harvey, William Henry. 1834. Algologhical illustrations. No. 1 Remarks on some British algae and descriptions of a new species recently added to our flora. J. Bot., Hooker 1: 296 – 305.
- Harvey, William Henry. 1838. The Genera of South African Plants. Cape Town, 429 pp.
- Harvey, William Henry. 1841. A Manual of the British Algae
- Harvey, William Henry. Description of Ballia, a new genus of Algae. – Hooker's Journ. Bot.' Bd 2
- Harvey, William Henry. 1844. Description of a minute alga from the coast of Ireland. Annals and Magazine of Natural History. 14: 27–28.
- Harvey, William Henry. 1844. Description of a new British species of Callithamnion (C. pollexfenii) Annals and Magagazine of Natural History. 14: 109 – 131.
- Harvey, William Henry. 1844. Algae of Tasmania, J. of Bot., London, 3:428–454.
- Harvey, William Henry. 1847. Phycologia Britannica. Plates 73–78). Reeve & Banham, London.
- Harvey, William Henry. 1848. Phycologia Britannica. Plates 147–216). Reeve & Banham, London.
- Harvey, William Henry. 1847. Nereis Australis or Algae of the Southern Ocean:... Transactions of the Royal Irish Academy. 22(Science):525–566. London.
- Harvey, William Henry. 1848. Directions for Collecting and Preserving Algae. Am. Journ., Sci. and Arts, II,6: 42–45.
- Harvey, William Henry. 1849. A Manual of the British Marine Algae... John van Voorst, London
- Harvey, William Henry. 1849. The sea-side book : being an introduction to the natural history of the British coasts John Van Voorst, London. Online here
- Harvey, William Henry. 1849. Phycologia Britannica. Plates 217–294). Reeve & Banham, London.
- Harvey, William Henry. 1850. Phycologia Britannica. Plates 295–354). Reeve & Banham, London.
- Harvey, William Henry. 1850. Observations on the Marine Flora of the Atlantic States. Proc. Am. Assn. Adv. Sci., pp. 79–80.
- Harvey, William Henry. 1851. Nereis Boreali-Americana:... Part I.— Melanospermaea. Smithsonian Institution.
- Harvey, William Henry. 1853. Nereis Boreali-Americana:... Part II.— Rhodospermeae.
- Harvey, William Henry. 1855. Some account of the marine botany of the colony of Western Australia. Transactions of the Royal Irish Academy, 22: 525–566.
- Harvey, William Henry. 1855. Algae. In J.D.Hooker, The Botany of the Antarctic Voyage 2: Flora Nova-Zelandiae II. London, 211–266, pl. 107–121.
- Harvey, William Henry. 1857. Nereis Boreali-Americana:... Part III.— Chlorospermeae.
- Harvey, William Henry. 1857. Short description of some new British algae, with two plates. Nat. Hist. Rev. 4: 201–204.
- Harvey, William Henry. 1858. List of Arctic Algae, Chiefly Compiled from Collections Brought Home by Officers of the Recent Searching Expeditions. Smithsonian Contrib. to Knowledge. Part III, Supl. 2: 132–134.
- Harvey, William Henry. 1859–1863. Thesaurus Capensis. Figures and brief descriptions of South African plants, selected from the Dublin University Herbarium.
- Harvey, William Henry & Otto Wilhelm Sonder. 1859–1933 Flora Capensis (7 vol. in 11)
- Harvey, William Henry. 1860. Algae. Pages 242–383, pl.185–196 in: The Botany of the Antarctic Voyage, Part III. Flora Tasmaniae. Vol. 2 (Ed. by J.D. Hooker) L.Reeve, London.
- Harvey, William Henry. 1862. Phycologia Australica. Vol 4, Pl. 181–240. London.
- Harvey, William Henry. 1862. Notice of a collection of algae made on the northwest coast of North America, chiefly at Vancouver's Island, by David Lyall, Esq., M.D., R.N., in the years 1859–1861. J. Linn. Soc. Bot. 6: 157–177.
- Harvey, William Henry. 1868. The Genera of South African Plants. (enlarged 2nd edition, edited by Sir J.D. Hooker). London.

== See also ==
- History of phycology

== Further ==
- Blackler, H. 1977. Harvey's Australian Algae in the Herbarium of Mrs Margaret Gatty in the department of botany of the University of St Andrew's (STA), Scotland. Taxon 26: 495 – 496.
- Evans, F. 2003. Mrs Alfred Gatty (1809–1873), author of "British Seaweeds". Phycologist. 65:14–17.
- Gordon, R.B. 1975. A collection of Wm. H. Harvey's Australian algae at West Chester, Pennsylvania, USA Taxon 24: 628.
- Ducker, S.C. 1977. W.H.Harvey's Australian Algae. Taxon 26 166–168.
- Guiry, M.D., Boalch, G.T. and Peters, A.F. 2010. William Henry Harvey's Grave Rediscovered. The Phycologist. Number 79: 14–15.
- Harvey, W.H. 1834. Algolical illustrations. No. 1.— Remarks on some British algae, and descriptions of new species recently added to our flora. J. Bot., Hooker, 1:296–305.
- Harvey, W.H. 1841. A Manual of the British Algae. Van Voorst, London.
- Harvey, W.H. 1844. Description of a minute alga from the coast of Ireland. Ann. & Mag. of Nat. Hist. 14:27–28.
- Harvey, W.H. 1848. Phycologia Britanica, plates 145–216. London.
- Harvey, W.H. 1852–58a. Nereis Boreali-Americana. Part I, Melanospermae. Smithsonian Contrib. to Knowledge, 3: 1–150, Pl, 1–12. 1852; Part II, Rhodospermae. Ibid., 5: 1–258, Pl. 13–36. 1853. Part III, Chlorospermae. Ibid., 10: 1–140. Pl. 37–50. 1858.
- Harvey, W.H. 1855. Some account of the marine botany of the colony of Western Australia. Trans. R. Ir. Acad. 22: 525–566.
- Harvey, W.H. 1862. Notice of a collection of algae made on the northwest coast of North America, chiefly at Vancouver's Island, by David Lyall. Esq., M.D., R.N., in the years 1859–61. J. Linn. Soc., Bot., 6:157–177.
- Harvey, W.H. and Hooker, J.D. 1845. Botany of the Antarctic voyage of H.M.discovery ships Erebus and Terror in the years 1839–1843... 1. Flora Antarctica. Part 1. Algae, pp. 175–193.
- May, V. 1977. Harvey's Australian Algae at the National Herbarium of New South Wales (NSW), Sydney, Australia. Taxon 26: 496.
- Morton, O. 1977. A note on W.H.Harvey's algae in the Ulster Museum. Ir. Nat. J. 19: 26.
- Morton, O. 1980. Three algal collections in the Ulster Museum Herbarium. Ir. Nat. J. 20: 33–37.
- Morton, O. 1981. American Algae Collected by W.H.Harvey and others, in the Ulster Museum Herbarium. Taxon 30: 867–868.
- Parkes, H. Introductory notes to the catalogue of marine algae housed in the herbarium of the Department of University College, Cork, Ireland. pp. 16–22. In Cullinane, J.P. 1973. Phycology of the South Coast of Ireland. The Cork University Press, University College Cork.
- Ross, J.H. 1976 The collection of W.H.Harvey's Australian algae at the National Herbarium of Victoria (MEL), Melbourne, Australia. Taxon 25: 525–526.
