= List of University of Northern Colorado alumni =

The University of Northern Colorado is a public university in Greeley, Colorado. The university was called the State Normal School of Colorado from 1889 to 1935, Colorado State College of Education at Greeley from 1935 to 1957, and Colorado State College from 1957 to 1970. Following are some of its notable alumni.

== Art ==
- Glen Alps, printmaker, coiner of term "collagraph"
- Jack Cassinetto, plein air painter
- Jane DeDecker, sculptor
- Gene Hatfield, artist and professor at the University of Central Arkansas
- Georgeann Robinson, non-degreed, Osage artist and activist
- Mackey Saturday, graphic designer

== Business ==
- Pat Stryker, billionaire businessperson, philanthropist, and political activist
- Ronda Stryker, director of Stryker Corporation and billionaire heiress

== Education ==
- Wendy Adams, physics educator
- Camila Alire, librarian and president of the American Library Association
- Carmen Roybal Arteaga, Chicana educator and activist
- Rosa Roberto Carter, president of the University of Guam 1977–1983
- Chih-Fu Cheng, vice president of the National Taiwan Normal University
- Katherine M. Cook, Colorado state superintendent of public instruction; chief, Division of Rural Education, Bureau of Education; chief, Division of Special Problems, Office of Education, HEW
- William E. Davis, president of Idaho State University and the University of New Mexico, and chancellor of the Oregon University System and Louisiana State University
- K. Newell Dayley, composer, hymnwriter, musician, and professor of music at Brigham Young University
- Ervin Dennis, professor at the University of Northern Iowa and member the Iowa House of Representatives
- Rick Edgeman, professor of Sustainability & Enterprises Performance, Aarhus University; professor and chair of Management and Center for Entrepreneurship Director, Fort Hays State University; academician of the International Academy of Quality
- Steven Forness, psychologist and professor emeritus of Psychiatry and Biobehavioral Sciences at the University of California
- Margaret Hayes Grazier, librarian and professor of library science at Wayne State University
- Elinor Miller Greenberg, author, educationalist, and speech pathologist
- Gene Hatfield, artist and professor at the University of Central Arkansas
- Bill Heller, dean of the College of Education at the University of South Florida St. Petersburg and member of Florida House of Representatives
- Rose Kekedo, leading educator in Papua New Guinea (PNG) and the first woman to be chancellor of the University of Papua New Guinea
- Allen Meadors, CEO at Penn State Altoona, chancellor at the University of North Carolina at Pembroke, and President of the University of Central Arkansas
- Charles M. Roessel, president of Diné College, photographer, journalist, and Director of the Bureau of Indian Education
- Jennie Mae Rucker, librarian and founding faculty of the Community College of Denver
- John Salas, president of the University of Guam, first provost of Vocational High School (now known as Guam Community College), and Senator in the Legislature of Guam
- Hortensia Soto, professor of mathematics at Colorado State University
- Donnis Thompson, professor of health, physical education, and recreation at the University of Hawaii at Manoa and the university's first women's athletic director, and State of Hawaii Department of Education school superintendent

== Entertainment ==
- William D. Alexander, filmmaker, winner of the 1964 Cannes Film Festival Palme d'Or for the short film The Village of Hope
- Neil Argo, composer for film and television
- Sa'ra Charismata (Sara Haile), singer/songwriter
- Walt Conley, folk singer, musician and actor
- Steve Eastin, character actor
- Bill Frisell, jazz guitarist
- Robert S. Frost, composer and music educator
- Greg Germann, actor known for Ally McBeal and Grey's Anatomy
- Marshall Gilkes, jazz trombonist and composer
- Edward W. Hardy, composer, violinist, violist, and producer
- Autumn Hurlbert, actress, singer, and dancer
- Ryan Malaty, actor and television personality
- Beth Malone, actress and singer
- Victoria Matlock, musical theatre actress
- Kody Mommaerts, ring announcer
- J. Durward Morsch, composer, prolific arranger, and trombonist
- Neyla Pekarek, vocalist and instrumentalist for The Lumineers
- Amanda Peterson, actress, appeared in the 1987 film Can't Buy Me Love
- Herminigildo Ranera, conductor, composer, arranger, performer, and educator
- Nathaniel Shaw, actor, dancer, and director
- Erica Sweany, film and television actress, dancer, singer, and multi-instrumentalist
- Tyler Ward, musician and producer
- Steven Wasson, director of Theatre de l'Ange Fou
- Bill Welsh, radio and television announcer
- Ed Werder, reporter for ESPN

== Government and civil service ==
- Michael J. Allen, district attorney for Colorado's 4th Judicial District
- Katherine Archuleta, former director of the United States Office of Personnel Management
- David Bernhardt, 53rd United States secretary of the interior
- Josh Divine, solicitor general of Missouri
- Henrietta H. Fore, 7th executive director of UNICEF, administrator of the United States Agency for International Development, director of U.S. Foreign Assistance, 11th under secretary of management in the Department of State, and 37th director of the United States Mint in the U.S. Department of Treasury
- Hillary Hall, clerk and recorder in Boulder County, Colorado who issued marriage licenses to same-sex couples before the Colorado Supreme Court ordered her to stop
- Lynn A. Johnson, assistant secretary for Family Support at the Department of Health and Human Services
- Huang Kun-huei, Taiwanese minister of the Mainland Affairs Council 1991–1994, minister of the interior 1994–1996
- Irene Montie, statistician in the US government service who became president of the Caucus for Women in Statistics
- Sully Sullenberger, captain of US Airways Flight 1549 and permanent representative of the United States to the International Civil Aviation Organization
- Edna Wilson-Mosley, civil rights specialist for Colorado's Civil Rights Commission

== Law ==
- Kato Crews, United States magistrate judge of the United States District Court for the District of Colorado
- Margaret L. Curry, state parole officer
- Steven Reams, sheriff of Weld County, Colorado

== Literature and journalism ==
- Steven Dietz, playwright
- Vinita Diteeyont, author
- Edwina Hume Fallis, writer
- J. Michael Martinez, poet
- Karyl McBride, author and marriage and family therapist
- James A. Michener, author
- Steven Moore, literary critic and Washington Post book reviewer
- Evan Oakley, poet
- Sayyid Qutb, author, poet, novelist, a leading member of the Egyptian Muslim Brotherhood, and Islamic scholar considered the "father of Salafi jihadism"
- Neal Rubin, The Detroit News columnist and author of comic strip Gil Thorp
- Don Welch, poet
- Connie Willis, science-fiction author

== Military ==
- Van E. Chandler, flying ace in World War II
- Jeffrey Chessani, commanding officer 3rd Battalion, 1st Marines during the November 2005 urban combat in Haditha, Iraq
- John L. Dolan, Lt. General of United States Air Force
- William M. Fraser III, United States Air Force general
- Stephen R. Lorenz, United States Air Force general
- Carol Mutter, Marine Corps lieutenant general
- Thurman D. Rodgers, United States Army general
- Randall Schmidt, United States Air Force general
- Robert L. Scott, United States Air Force general
- David N. Senty, United States Air Force major general
- Edward Tipper, United States Army soldier
- Frances C. Wilson, United States Marine Corps general

== Politics ==
- Audrey Aanes, disability rights activist known as the "mother of the Independent Living Movement in Alaska"
- Bob Bacon, former Colorado state senator
- Tom Carlson, Nebraska Legislature 2007–2015
- John Cooke, Colorado Senate
- Kimberly Corban, victims' rights advocate
- Chris Coursey, member of Sonoma County Board of Supervisors and mayor of Santa Rosa, California
- Robert De Young, member of Florida House of Representatives
- Ervin Dennis, member of Iowa House of Representatives and professor at the University of Northern Iowa
- Rhonda Fields, member of Colorado State House of Representatives
- Linda Gray, Arizona state senator
- Bill Heller, member of Florida House of Representatives, dean of the College of Education at the University of South Florida St. Petersburg
- Janak Joshi, member of Colorado House of Representatives
- Richard Kelly, U.S. House of Representatives
- Judy Kennedy, mayor of Newburgh, New York
- Halima Khatun, Bangladeshi activist, writer, and academic who took part in Bengali language movement
- Maryanne Kusaka, mayor of the County of Kaua'i
- Don Marostica, member of Colorado House of Representatives
- Jack McGuire, member of Illinois House of Representatives
- Rory Ogle, member of New Mexico House of Representatives
- Andrew Perchlik, member of Vermont Senate
- Mary Peltola, member of United States House of Representatives from Alaska
- Lisa Poppaw, former Fort Collins city council member
- Karlee Provenza, member of Wyoming House of Representatives
- Mary Pruitt, Tennessee state representative
- Nathan Reichert, member of Iowa House of Representatives
- Jeannie Ritter, former First Lady of Colorado
- John Salas, senator in the Legislature of Guam, first provost of Vocational High School (now Guam Community College) and president of the University of Guam
- Eunice Sato, mayor of Long Beach, California
- Sue Schafer, member of Colorado House of Representatives
- Shyu Jong-shyong, Taiwanese politician, deputy secretary-general of the Executive Yuan and deputy mayor of Taichung City
- Harry Stephens, Kansas Senate
- Ken Summers, member of Colorado House of Representatives
- Tom Tancredo, member of United States House of Representatives
- Nancy Todd, member of Colorado Senate and Colorado House of Representatives
- Tonya Van Beber, member of Colorado House of Representatives
- Wellington Webb, former mayor of Denver
- Claire Wilson, member of Washington State Senate
- Kenneth W. Winters, member of Kentucky State Senate

== Sports ==
- Mike Anderson, college baseball coach
- Kirk Archibeque, professional basketball player
- David Arnold, professional basketball player
- Duane Banks, professional baseball player and college baseball coach
- Devon Beitzel, professional basketball player
- Bryce Boarman, Paralympic soccer player
- Jacob Bobenmoyer, professional football player
- Bob Boerigter, sports administrator and retired commissioner for the Mid-America Intercollegiate Athletics Association
- Gregg Brandon, college football coach of Colorado School of Mines
- Dominic Breazeale, boxer
- Irv Brown, college baseball coach, commissioner of the Colorado Athletic Conference and Mountain Collegiate Baseball League, and analyst for the NBA on ESPN
- Sam Brunelli, professional football player
- Pat Burris, two-time Olympian in judoka and Pan American Games bronze medalist
- Pete Butler, college football, basketball, and baseball coach and college athletics administrator
- Cisco Carlos, professional baseball player
- Joel Collier, professional football coach and executive
- Earnest Collins Jr., college football coach
- Gerry Dattilio, professional gridiron football player
- Jordan Davis, professional basketball player
- Jourdan Delacruz, Olympic weightlifter
- Elijah Dotson, professional football player
- Reed Doughty, football safety for Washington Redskins
- Ben Dreith, AFL and NFL referee
- Terry Dunn, head men's basketball coach at Dartmouth College
- R. W. Eaks, professional golfer
- Kai Edwards, professional basketball player
- Ron Ernst, football player and coach
- Brian Ferguson, football coach
- Justin Gaethje, professional mixed martial artist, currently competing in the UFC
- Andy Haase, professional football player
- Pat Haggerty, NFL referee
- Ron Herbel, professional baseball player
- Mike Higgins, professional basketball player
- Tracy Holland, head football coach at the University of Central Oklahoma
- Paul Hubbard, college football coach
- Carl Iwasaki, professional baseball coach
- Vincent Jackson, football player for Tampa Bay Buccaneers
- Virgil Jester, baseball pitcher for Milwaukee Braves
- Dirk Johnson, professional football coach
- Adrienne Jordan, professional soccer player
- Dave Keller, baseball minor league player and coach
- Bill Kenney, quarterback for Kansas City Chiefs and politician
- Jeff Knapple, professional gridiron football player
- Dalton Knecht, professional basketball player
- William Knuckles, football and basketball coach
- Jerry Krause, college basketball executive
- Lynn Lashbrook, president and founder of Sports Management Worldwide
- Joe Lindahl, football player, coach, and administrator
- Bob Lord, college and professional football coach
- Mike Madden, former baseball pitcher for Houston Astros
- Milt Martin, college football coach, wrestling coach, and athletics administrator
- Corte McGuffey, professional football player
- Don Meyer, college baseball coach
- Dave Nakama, baseball player and coach
- Joe Pennucci, head baseball coach at East Tennessee State University
- Dennis Preece, high school wrestling coach
- Brad Pyatt, professional football player
- Jonah Radebaugh, professional basketball player
- Tony Ramirez, professional football player
- Jed Roberts, former Canadian Football League player with the Edmonton Eskimos
- Tom Runnells, professional baseball player, coach, and manager
- Frankie Saenz, (attended), wrestler and professional Mixed Martial Artist with UFC
- John Sanders, professional baseball scout, Major League Baseball player for the Kansas City Athletics, manager at the pro level, and a college baseball coach
- Kyle Sloter, professional football player
- Aaron Smith, football defensive end for Pittsburgh Steelers
- Ernie Smith, college football coach
- Loren Snyder, football quarterback for Dallas Cowboys
- Dave Stalls, football defensive end for Dallas Cowboys, Tampa Bay Buccaneers, Los Angeles Raiders and Denver Gold
- Joe Strain, professional baseball player
- Rich Stubler, football coach, primarily in the Canadian Football League
- Jed Stugart, football player and coach
- Peter Stuursma, football player and coach
- Joe Taibi, professional football player
- Cedric Tillman, professional arena football player
- Herve Tonye-Tonye, Canadian Football League linebacker, Toronto Argonauts
- Khoa Tran, professional basketball player
- Mike Trujillo, professional baseball player
- Bob Wachs, college football and basketball coach
- Frank Wainright, former football tight end for New Orleans Saints, Philadelphia Eagles, Miami Dolphins and Baltimore Ravens
- Nick Willhite, professional baseball player

== Other ==
- Lucile Buchanan, first black woman to graduate from the University of Colorado Boulder
- Carlotta Walls LaNier, member of Little Rock Nine
- Mary Golda Ross, first Native American female engineer and first female engineer with the Lockheed Corporation
- Penelope Wong, 2026 James Beard Award winner for Best Chef in the Mountain region.
