= Richard Ligon =

English writer

A True and Exact History of the Island of Barbados (1673)

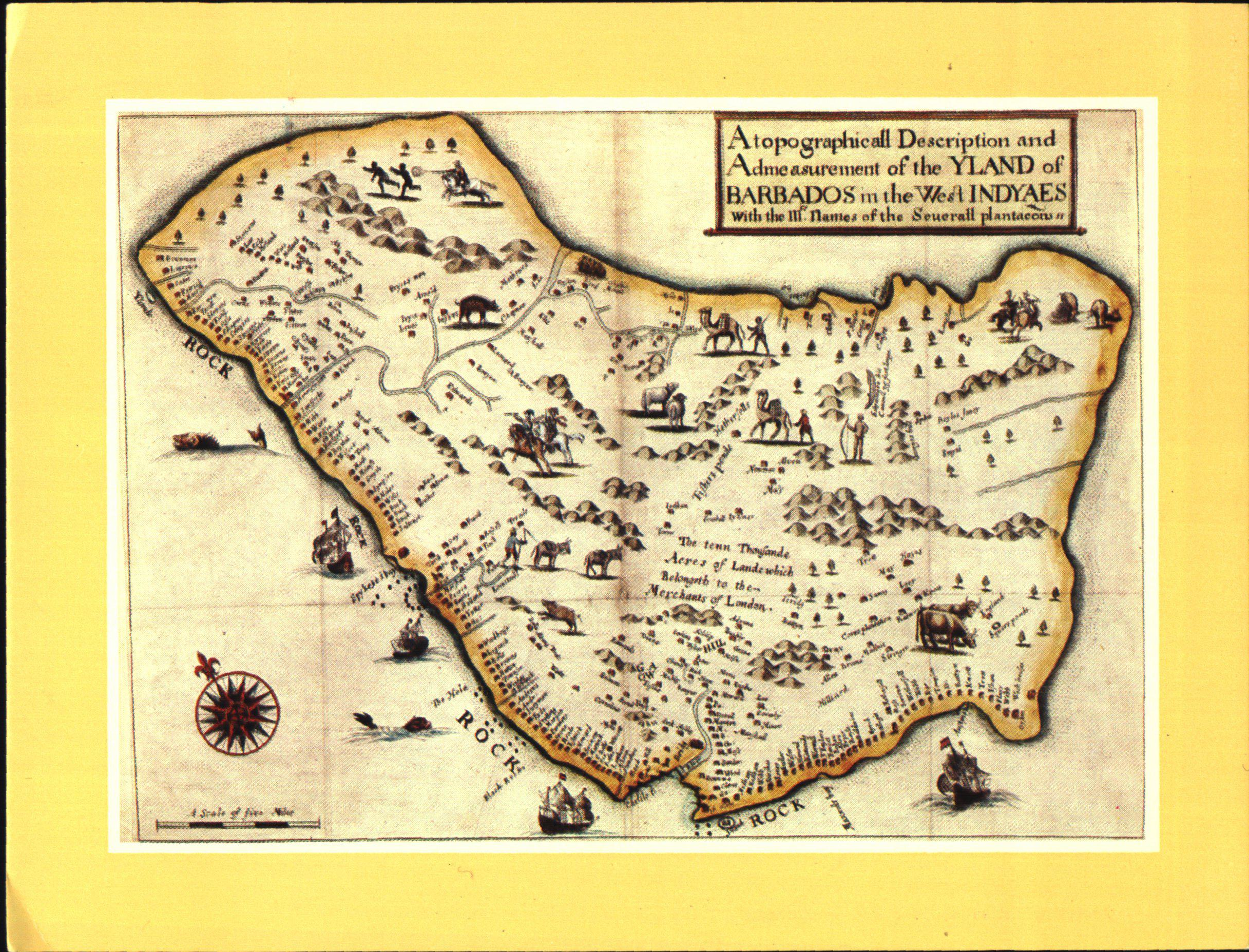
The earliest printed map of Barbados by Ligon

Richard Ligon (1585?–1662) was an English writer. He lost his fortune as a royalist during the English Civil War (1642-1651), and during this turbulent time in England he found himself, as he notes in his narrative, a "stranger in my own country.” On 14 June 1647, he left for Barbados to gain his fortune in the Caribbean, like many of his fellow countrymen. After two years residence on the island he was attacked by a fever, and returned to England in 1650. He was soon afterward put into prison by his creditors. There are conflicting reports as to whether his narrative was conceived of in prison as a way to pay off his creditors and gain his freedom, or before his imprisonment at the urging of Brian Duppa, Bishop of Salisbury. His work, a folio with maps and illustrations, is entitled A True and Exact History of the Island of Barbados and was published in London in 1657 and again in 1673.

== English court ==
Ligon may have been a page in household of Anne of Denmark, queen-consort to James VI and I, and he attended the court of Charles I of England. He mentions the appearance of Anne of Denmark at a masque at the Whitehall Banqueting House in his writings, and seems to describe the New World as mediated through his experience of masque culture. In 1628, Ligon was the executor of the court musician John Coprario.

== Importance in literary analysis ==
Ligon's portrait of life in Barbados has made it into a number of literary journals and historical texts in an attempt by many scholars to derive exactly what life in the islands was like and exactly how Europeans, particularly the English, perceived slaves and their role in the sugar trade. One review in the journal Early American Literature offers a more linguistic approach to Ligon's texts. Author Thomas W. Krise reviews Keith A. Sandiford's analysis of words like "sweet" and "negotiation" in Ligon and says that such an analysis calls attention to various systems of contradiction present in our current understanding of Old World Caribbean culture.

Ligon offers a highly racialised comparison of Native Americans and African slaves brought to labour in Barbados.

== Sources ==
- Castillo, Susan & Schweitzer, Ivy, eds. (2001). The Literatures of Colonial America: An Anthology. Blackwell Anthologies. Malden, MA & Oxford, England: Blackwell. pp. 205–213. ISBN 9780631211259. OCLC 44461834. OL 6786942M – via the Internet Archive.
- Krise, Thomas W. (2002). "Review of The Cultural Politics of Sugar: Caribbean Slavery and Narratives of Colonialism by Keith A. Sandiford". Early American Literature. 37 (3): 554–557. doi:10.1353/eal.2002.0028. ISSN 1534-147X. JSTOR 25057287. OCLC 5543810312. S2CID 153709770.
