= Edward Cox =

Edward Cox, Ed Cox or other variant forms may refer to:

- Edward Eugene Cox (1880–1952), United States representative from Georgia
- Edward Everett Cox (1867–1931), publisher from Indiana
- Edward F. Cox (born 1946), American lawyer, son-in-law of Richard M. Nixon
- Edward G. Cox (1876–1963), American linguist and yachtsman
- Edward King Cox (1829–1883), Australian politician
- Edward William Cox (1809–1879), British MP for Taunton, 1868–1869
- Edward Cox (Australian politician) (died 1868), English-born Australian politician
- Edward Cox (canoeist) (born 1985), British sprint canoeist
- Edward Cox (cricketer) (1863–1925), English cricketer and British Army officer.
- Ed Cox (poet) (1946–1992), American poet
- Ed Cox (artist), American role-playing game artist
- Edward Owen Cox (1866–1932), Welsh-born Australian businessman and politician

== See also ==
- Ted Cox (disambiguation)
- Edward Cocks (1786–1812), British Army officer and politician
- Edward Cock (1805–1892), British surgeon
- Edwin L. Cox, American oilman and philanthropist
