= Virginia Jackson =

American literary scholar

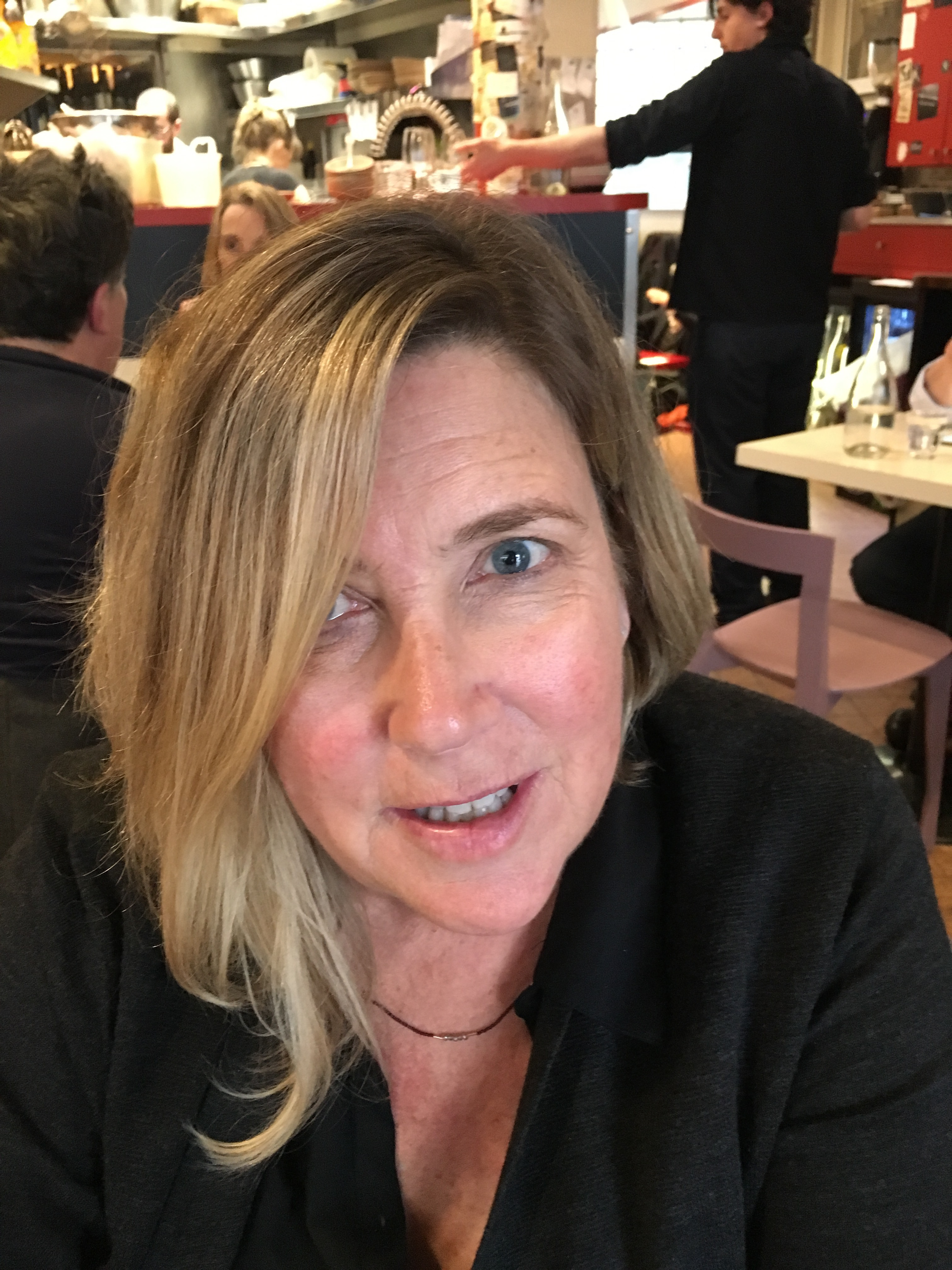

Virginia Walker Jackson is UCI Endowed Chair in Rhetoric at the University of California, Irvine. She is one of the founders of historical poetics and of the new lyric studies, and is credited with "energiz[ing] criticism" about Emily Dickinson in the twenty-first century. Her research includes nineteenth-century American poetry, the history of American poetry, comparative literature, lyric theory, the history of criticism, the history of poetics, and genre theory. She is more recently credited with revising the racialized history of American poetics.

Jackson is the author of the definition of "Lyric" in the most recent edition of The Princeton Encyclopedia of Poetry and Poetics. With Yopie Prins, she is the editor of The Lyric Theory Reader (Johns Hopkins University Press, 2014).

Jackson studied comparative literature at UCLA and Princeton, where she earned her Ph.D. She taught at Boston University, Rutgers University, New York University, and Tufts University before going to Irvine in 2012. Her first book, Dickinson's Misery: A Theory of Lyric Reading (2005) won both the MLA Prize for a First Book and the Christian Gauss Award from Phi Beta Kappa Her most recent book is Before Modernism: Inventing American Lyric (2023), which the poet Terrance Hayes describes as "a radical reorientation of American lyric literary assumptions," in which Jackson "unearths the overlooked, undervalued Black poets at the root of modern American poetry, and every branch of contemporary poetry trembles with new fruit.” She is a recipient of two National Endowment for the Humanities fellowships for her work on the history of American poetry.

== Publications ==
=== Books ===
- Before Modernism: Inventing American Lyric
- Dickinson's Misery: A Theory of Lyric Reading (Princeton University Press, 2005)
- Her other books include On Periodization: Selected Essays from the English Institute (ed. ACLS e-book, 2010) and The Lyric Theory Reader: A Critical Anthology (Johns Hopkins University Press, 2014)

Articles and Essays

2022 “Apostrophe, Animation, and Racism” Critical Inquiry, Vol. 48 Issue 4, Summer, 652-675

2022 “Old Lyric Things,” What Kind of Thing is a Medieval Lyric? ed. Nicholas Watson and Cristina Cervone. Philadelphia: University of Pennsylvania Press.

2020 “Historical Poetics and the Dream of Interpretation: A Response to Paul Fry, Modern Language Quarterly, 81:3 (September 2020), 289-318.

2019 "Poe's Common Meter," in The Oxford Handbook of Edgar Allan Poe, ed. J. Gerald Kennedy and Scott Peeples (Oxford: Oxford University Press, 2019), 121-139.

2019 “The Cadence of Consent: Francis Barton Gummere, Lyric Rhythm, and White Poetics,” in Critical Rhythm: The Poetics of a Literary Life Form (New York: Fordham University Press, 2019), 87-106.

2018 “’Our Poets’: William Cullen Bryant and the White Romantic Lyric,” New Literary History, 49:4 (Autumn 2018), 521-551.

2016 “American Romanticism, Again,” Studies in Romanticism, 55 (Fall 2016), 319-346.

2016 “Specters of the Ballad,” Nineteenth-Century Literature, Vol. 71, No. 2, 176-196.

2014 “Longfellow in His Time,” Chapter 11 of The Cambridge History of American Poetry, ed. Alfred Bendixen and Stephen Burt (Cambridge: Cambridge University Press), 238-259.

2012 “The Poet as Poetess,” The Cambridge Companion to Nineteenth-Century American Poetry, ed. Kerry Larson (Cambridge: Cambridge University Press),54-76.

2012 “Lyric,” The Princeton Encyclopedia of Poetry and Poetics. Fourth Edition, ed. Roland Greene, et al. (Princeton: Princeton University Press), 826-834.

2010 “Periodization and its Discontents,” Introduction to On Periodization: Selected Papers from the English Institute, 2008

2008 “Thinking Dickinson Thinking Poetry,” in The Blackwell Companion to Emily Dickinson, ed. Mary Loeffelholz and Martha Nell Smith (Blackwell Publishing), 205-221.

2008 “Bryant; or, American Romanticism,” in The Traffic in Poems: Nineteenth-Century Poetry and Transatlantic Exchange, ed. Meredith McGill (Rutgers University Press, 2008), 185-204.

2008 “Who Reads Poetry?” PMLA, vol. 123, no. 2, January, 181-187.

2008 “The Story of Boon; or, Parables of the Poetess,” ESQ: A Journal of the American Renaissance, vol. 54, nos. 1-4, December, 240-268.

2005. “American Victorian Poetry: The Transatlantic Poetic,” Victorian Poetry, 43:2, Summer (Virginia Jackson, Guest Editor), 157-164.

2005 “Dickinson Undone,” Raritan (Spring), Vol. XXIV, Number 4, 128-148.

2000 “Poetry and Experience,” Raritan (Fall), Vol. XX, Number 2., 126-135.

2000 “Poe, Longfellow, and the Institution of Poetry,” Poe Studies. Vol. 33, numbers 1 and 2, 23-28.

Reviews and Public Writing:

2021 "Triptych for Lauren," Critical Inquiry Blog, July 19, 2021

2021 “How Does It Feel to Be a Problem?” The Georgia Review, Spring 2021

2021 “The Poetry of the Past” (with Meredith Martin), Avidly, Los Angeles Review of Books, February 18

2021 “The Poetry of the Future” (with Meredith Martin), Avidly, Los Angeles Review of Books, January

2015 “The Function of Criticism at the Present Time,” Los Angeles Review of Books, April 12
