= English Association =

Subject association for English

The English Association
- Type: Charity
- Founded: 1906
- Founder: F.S. Boas, A.C. Bradley, Sir Israel Gollancz, et.al.
- Headquarters: London
- Website: www.englishassociation.ac.uk

For the Study Association for English Language and Culture at Radboud University, see T.E.A. The English Association.

The English Association is a subject association for English dedicated to furthering the study and enjoyment of English language and literature in schools, higher education institutes and amongst the public in general. It was founded in 1906 by a group of English scholars including F. S. Boas, A.C. Bradley and Sir Israel Gollancz. Since December 1993, the association has been based at the University of Leicester. It received its royal charter (under the legal name of the Chartered English Association) on 5 September 2006.

Past presidents have included John Galsworthy, Harley Granville-Barker, John Bailey, Sir Ernest Gowers, Sir Kenneth Clark, C.V. Wedgwood, Elaine Treharne, Peter Kitson, Rowland Prothero, and George Steiner. The association elects Fellows in special recognition of their significant enrichment and promotion of English. There are over 350 such Fellows and they are entitled to use the letters FEA or, according to the charter, FCEA (Fellow of the Chartered English Association) after their names.

== Publications ==
- The Year's Work in English Studies
- The Year's Work in Critical and Cultural Theory
- English
- Essays & Studies
- The Use of English The Use of English is published by the English Association and Hobbs.
- English 4-11
