= Rosa Roberto Carter =

Guamanian educator

President of the University of Guam
- In office 1977–1983
- Preceded by: Antonio C. Yamashita
- Succeeded by: Jose Q. Cruz

Personal details
- Born: Rosa Garrido Roberto-Carter; August 29, 1929
- Died: April 11, 2010 (aged 80) Yona, Guam
- Party: Republican Party of Guam
- Spouse: Lee Carter
- Education: Northern State University; Sydney University; Northern Colorado University; Bowling Green State University

Rosa Garrido Roberto-Carter (August 29, 1929 – April 11, 2010) was a Guamanian educator who served as the President of the University of Guam from 1977 to 1983.

Carter, the oldest of nine children, was born to Antonia Santos Garrido and Jose Duenas Roberto on 29 August 1929. Under the Japanese occupation of Guam (1941-1944), she was interned at the Manengon concentration camp. She graduated from George Washington High School, earned a Bachelor of Science at the Northern State University, a graduate diploma in comparative education as a Fulbright Fellow from the University of Sydney, a Master of Arts at the University of Northern Colorado, and a Doctorate in Philosophy in Education Supervision at Bowling Green State University.

Carter has worked as an elementary teacher for the Government of Guam, an Assistant Principal at Wettengel Elementary School, and an Associate Professor at the University of Guam. She became the president of the University of Guam in 1977, and held the position until 1983. She was the university's first female president, and its only female president until Anita Borja Enriquez became the university's president in 2023. At the University of Guam, she has also worked as a Registrar, Admissions Officer, Director of Registration, Financial Aid Officer, and Dean of Students. On 29 April 2009, she was added to the Guam Educator's Hall of Fame. She died 11 April 2010. On 30 November 2022, a hearing was held to decide whether or not to rename Talo'fo'fo' Elementary School after Carter and Joaquina Mendiola Cruz Roberto. Robert Underwood, writing in the Pacific Daily News, said that the proposal to rename the school after two people "invited controversy and ridicule", and that some people in favor of the name change were "proclaim[ing] that their lack of knowledge is enough reason to be against naming the school after either of these prominent women.".
