= Yopie Prins =

Yopie Prins is the Irene Butter Collegiate Professor of English and Comparative Literature at the University of Michigan. Her fields of research include classical reception, comparative literature, historical poetics, lyric theory, translation studies, Nineteenth-Century poetry, English Hellenism, and Victorian poetry.

Prins studied ancient Greek at Swarthmore College, and English literature at Newnham College of the University of Cambridge. She spent a year at the University of Amsterdam as a Fulbright Scholar, before gaining a PhD in Comparative Literature from Princeton University in 1991. She taught for four years at Oberlin College before joining the faculty of the University of Michigan. Having taught at the University of Michigan since 1994, she is currently the Chair of the Department of Comparative Literature there. She was the vice president of the American Association for Comparative Literature from 2013 to 2015, and president from 2015 to 2016.

Prins is married to the American composer Michael Daugherty.

== Publications ==
=== Books ===
- Prins, Yopie (2017). Ladies’ Greek: Victorian Translations of Tragedy. Princeton: Princeton University Press.
- The Lyric Theory Reader: A Critical Anthology, ed. Virginia Jackson and Yopie Prins (The Johns Hopkins University Press, 2014).
- Prins, Yopie (1999). Victorian Sappho. Princeton: Princeton University Press.
- Dwelling in Possibility: Women Poets and Critics on Poetry, ed. Yopie Prins and Maeera Shreiber (Cornell University Press, 1997).

=== Essays ===
- Sapphic Stanzas: How can we read the rhythm? In Critical Rhythm: The Poetics of a Literary Life Form, ed. Ben Glaser and Jonathan Culler (Fordham University Press, 2019).
- What is Historical Poetics?, in Modern Language Quarterly 77.1 (Winter 2016).
- This Bird That Never Settles: A Virtual Conversation with Anne Carson about Greek Tragedy, in The Oxford Handbook of Greek Drama in the Americas, ed. Kathryn Bosher, Fiona Macintosh, Justine McConnell, Patrick Rankine (Oxford University Press, 2015).
- Break Break Break’ into Song, in Meter Matters: Verse Cultures of the Long Nineteenth Century, ed. Jason Hall (Ohio University Press, 2011).
- Classics for Victorians. Victorian Studies 52.2 (Winter 2010).
- Historical Poetics, Dysprosody, and the Science of English Verse. In “New Lyric Studies,” PMLA 123.1 (January 2008).
- Robert Browning, Transported by Meter. In The Traffic in Poems: Nineteenth-Century Poetry and Transatlantic Exchange, ed. Meredith McGill (Rutgers University Press, 2007).
- Metrical Translation: Nineteenth-Century Homers and the Hexameter Mania. In Nation, Language and the Ethics of Translation, ed. Sandra Bermann and Michael Wood (Princeton University Press, 2005).
- Sappho Recomposed: A Song Cycle by Granville and Helen Bantock. In The Figure of Music in Nineteenth-Century British Poetry, ed. Phyllis Weliver (Ashgate Press, 2005).
- Greek Maenads, Victorian Spinsters. In Victorian Sexual Dissidence, ed. Richard Dellamora (University of Chicago Press, 1999). Awarded Prize for Best Essay in 1999 by the Women's Classical Caucus of the American Philological Association.
- Sappho’s Afterlife in Translation. In Re-Reading Sappho: Reception and Transmission, ed. Ellen Greene (University of California Press, 1997).
- The Power of the Speech Act: Aeschylus' Furies and Their Binding Song. Arethusa 24.2 (Fall 1991).
- Violence Bridling Speech: Browning’s Translation of Aeschylus’s Agamemnon. Victorian Poetry 27.3-4 (1989).
