= The Literary London Society =

British scholarly society

The Literary London Society is a scholarly society based in the United Kingdom which promotes the study of the literature of London. Its constitution states that "the Society shall foster interdisciplinary and historically wide-ranging research into London literature in its historical, social, and cultural contexts, to include all periods and genres of writing and representations about, set in, inspired by, or alluding to central and suburban London and its environs, from the city’s roots in pre-Roman times to its imagined futures".

== Activities ==
The society publishes an online journal, The Literary London Journal, and organises an annual conference, normally held at the Institute of English Studies of the University of London. It also organises reading groups, gives prizes to postgraduate students, and, when possible, offers support to scholars studying London literature.

== Society information ==
An annual Literary London Conference had been running informally since 2002, while The Literary London Journal, edited by Lawrence Phillips, had appeared biannually since 2003. The Literary London Society was founded in July 2011 to formalise the conference and journal, with Brycchan Carey of Kingston University as the first president. The current president of the Literary London Society is Martin Dines from the Kingston University. The current editor of The Literary London Journal is Nick Bentley from Keele University.
