= American Literature Association =

Coalition of societies devoted to the study of American authors

- Abbreviation: ALA
- Formation: 1989
- Type: Non-profit; NGO
- Purpose: The study of American authors
- Region served: United States
- Executive Director: Alfred Bendixen
- Website: americanliteratureassociation.org

The American Literature Association (ALA) is "a coalition of societies devoted to the study of American authors". It has some 110 affiliated societies, mostly concerned with the work of a particular author (e.g. the Emily Dickinson International Society or the Thoreau Society), some thematic such as the Society of Early Americanists. It was founded in 1989.

It holds an annual conference, alternating between east coast and west coast venues, attracting about 850 delegates. Some societies choose to have one of their own main meetings as part of the ALA conference, and many sessions of the conference are sponsored by member societies. There are no plenary sessions at the conference, but seven or eight simultaneous events in each time slot.

The ALA has an executive board and a "Council of American Authors Societies", which represents the member organizations. The executive director is Alfred Bendixen, who has held this post since the association's beginnings in 1989.
