= Nathaniel Shaw (director) =

American actor, dancer, and director

- Born: Menlo Park, California, US
- Other name: Nathaniel Keuter
- Education: University of Northern Colorado
- Occupations: Theatre director, artistic director, choreographer, actor, theatre producer, dancer
- Spouse: Lisa Rumbauskas

Nathaniel Shaw is an American theatre director, choreographer, and actor. He began his career as a dancer with the Paul Taylor Dance Company and later became the founding and artistic director of The Active Theater in New York. He was Associate Choreographer for the Broadway production and first national tour of Once (musical) In 2015 he became the Development Director for the Tony and Olivier Award-winning producers, Glass Half Full Productions. In July 2016, he became Artistic Director of Virginia Repertory Theatre in Richmond. In October 2021, Shaw launched The New Theatre, dedicated to advancing artform and industry, with a primary focus on new play development.

== Early life ==
Shaw was born in Menlo Park, California, the son of modern dancers Cliff Keuter and Elina Mooney. He received a BA in Musical Theater from the University of Northern Colorado.

== Career ==
From 2004 - 2006, Shaw was a dancer with the Paul Taylor Dance Company. Featured roles included Mercuric Tidings, Lost Found Lost, Arden Court, Sea to Shining Sea, and many others. He originated roles in Spring Rounds and Banquet of Vultures.

In 2007 he played Will Parker alongside Kelli O'Hara and Will Chase in the production of Oklahoma! that was presented by Lyric Theatre of Oklahoma City for the centennial of statehood.

He was a founder and the artistic director for The Active Theater, which had its inaugural season in 2009 and an inaugural gala featuring performances by Tony Award-winner David Hyde Pierce, Tony Award-winner Chuck Cooper and Tony Award-nominee Dee Hoty. During his six seasons there, he directed the first New York City revival of The Violet Hour, and the production was nominated for an Innovative Theater Award for Best Revival. He also directed the world premieres of Bridgeboy and Body Language.

In 2013, he became an Associate Choreographer for Tony Award-nominee Steven Hoggett during the Broadway production of Once. In addition to the Broadway run, Shaw worked on the first national tour and traveled with Tony Award-winning director John Tiffany and Music Supervisor Martin Lowe to cast productions overseas.

In 2015 he directed Peter and the Starcatcher for Virginia Repertory Theatre. In that same year he joined Glass Half Full, best known for producing The Curious Incident of the Dog in the Night-Time (play), as their Director of New Plays, identifying future projects.

In July 2016, he became Artistic Director of Virginia Repertory Theatre. During his four year tenure at Virginia Rep, Nathaniel directed the World Premiere of The End of War by David L. Robbins, the regional premiere of In the Heights, the World Premiere of River Ditty by Matthew Mooney Keuter, West Side Story, Curious Incident of the Dog in the Night-time, The 39 Steps, and Once (a co-production with The Fulton Theatre.

In October 2021, alongside Executive Director Vida Williams, Shaw launched The New Theatre in Richmond, Virginia, devoted to advancing art form and industry, with a primary focus on new play development. The New Theatre subsequently merged with The Firehouse Theatre in 2023, the community's leading producer of thought-provoking contemporary new work. Initially as Producing Artistic Director, then as Executive Director, Shaw has led a revitalization at Firehouse resulting in significant economic growth, capital expansion, enhanced production values, and greater critical acclaim.

== Personal life ==
Shaw is married to choreographer and dancer Lisa Rumbauskas. He has two sons, Benjamin and Caleb.
