= Ted Cox =

Ted Cox may refer to:

- Ted Cox (American football) (1903–1989), American football coach
- Ted Cox (baseball) (1955–2020), American baseball player

== See also ==
- Edward Cox (disambiguation)
