= Sa'ra Charismata =

Swedish-Eritrean singer and songwriter

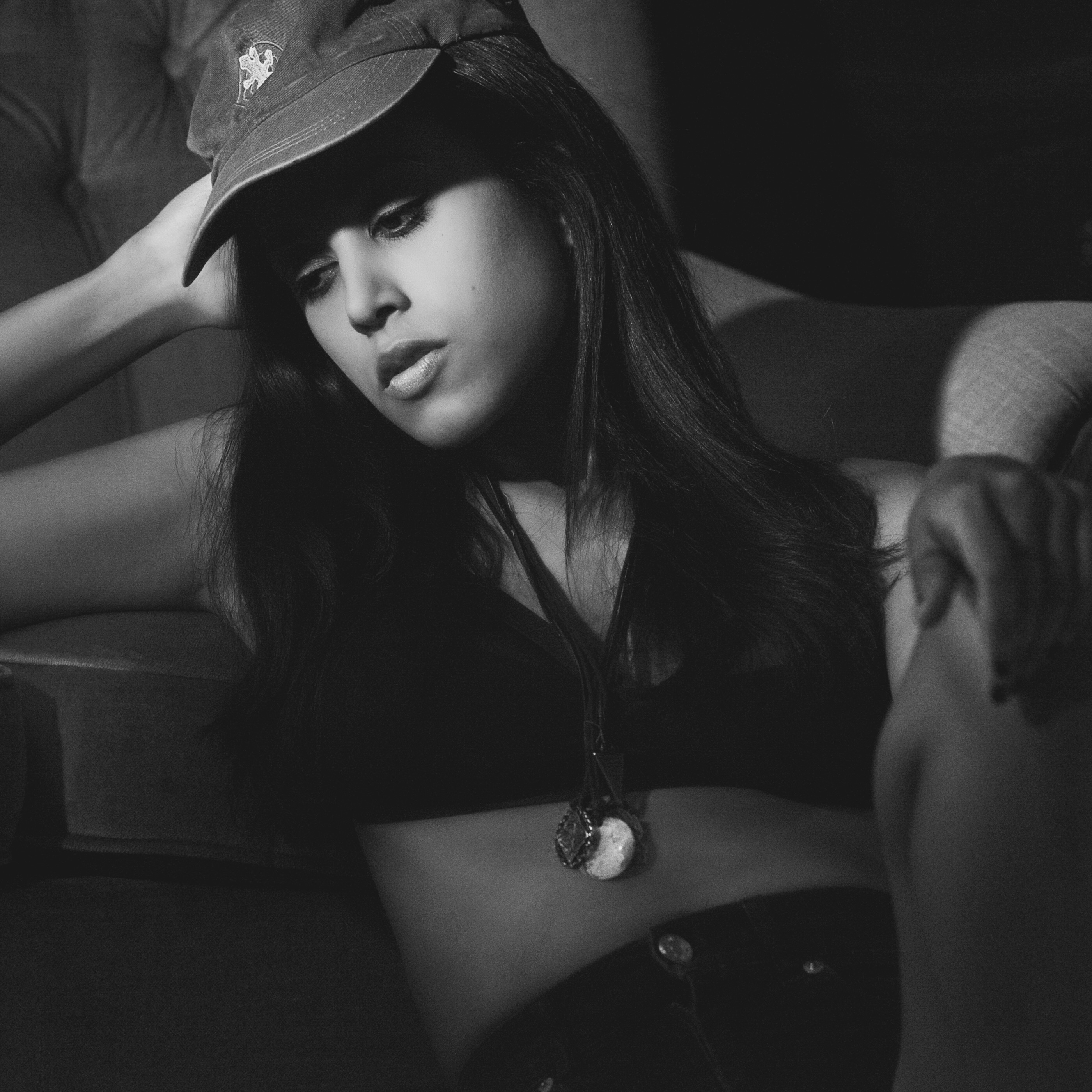
- Sa'ra Charismata at a recording studio in Stockholm, Sweden.

Background information
- Genres: Protest Pop, punk, indie pop, hip hop
- Occupation(s): Singer, songwriter
- Instrument(s): Vocals, guitar
- Labels: Virgin Records Sweden

Sara Haile, better known by her stage name Sa'ra Charismata, is a Swedish singer and songwriter.

== Early life ==
Sa'ra Charismata's parents fled the conflict in 1970s Province of Eritrea in Ethiopia, finding sanctuary in Sweden where she was born and raised. Growing up across three continents, Sa'ra Charismata devoted her adolescent years addressing challenging issues pertaining to racial, economic and gender inequalities through music, field activism and legal practice, primarily in The United States.

== Career ==
Charismata began her music career in 2004 while she attended college at the University of Northern Colorado. In college, Charismata spearheaded the campus organization The Summit Organizing Committee on Social Justice and Diversity (SOC) and during that time her music was mainly acoustic and political in nature. After college, Charismata intended to continue her political career so she attended law school at Fordham University School of Law in New York City. However, in 2013, once she had earned her Juris Doctor degree, Charismata left the legal field to fully pursue a career in music instead. In 2015, Charismata gave a TEDx talk where she spoke of her journey going from the legal field to fully embracing a career in music.

Having spent the majority of her artist career as an independent artist, in 2015, Charismata signed a record deal with Virgin Records Sweden after she independently released "Mushroom," her most popular song yet, gaining the attention of radio and record label executives in Sweden. In her song "Mushroom", a high-energy punk-pop tune, Charismata uses references to Super Mario Bros. characters like Koopa Troopa to draw comparison to the current social order and political climate, raising the question, who is really in control?

In 2014, Charismata was nominated Rookie Artist of the Year at the Denniz Pop Awards alongside Tove Lo and listed as "a name to watch for" by Sweden's leading music journalist Jan Gradvall.

== Musical style and influences ==
Charismata described her early style of music as "Protest Pop," a term she coined herself. Afropunk has previously described Charismata as "the quintessential revival of the modern protest song in pop music" and "an outspoken voice that mainstream media may never acknowledge."

Charismata cites the careers of Bob Marley, Bad Brains, and John Lennon as her biggest inspirations. Charismata is also known for her high-energy live performances influenced by the 1980s New York punk scene. She has performed at large-scale festivals such as Roskilde Festival in Denmark and Peace & Love Festival in Sweden.

Whereas Charismata's previous work has been mainly political in nature, her more recent work also includes more personal lyrics.

== Singles discography ==
| Title | Year |
|---|---|
| Gold Digga | 2014 |
| Sheep (Let Me Go) | 2015 |
| Mushroom | 2015 |
| Big Man (Pharmaceuticals) | 2016 |
| Addicted (To Your Messed Up Kinda Lovin) | 2016 |
| Hypocrites | 2020 |
| Life Is Not About Control | 2021 |
