= Brycchan Carey =

British author

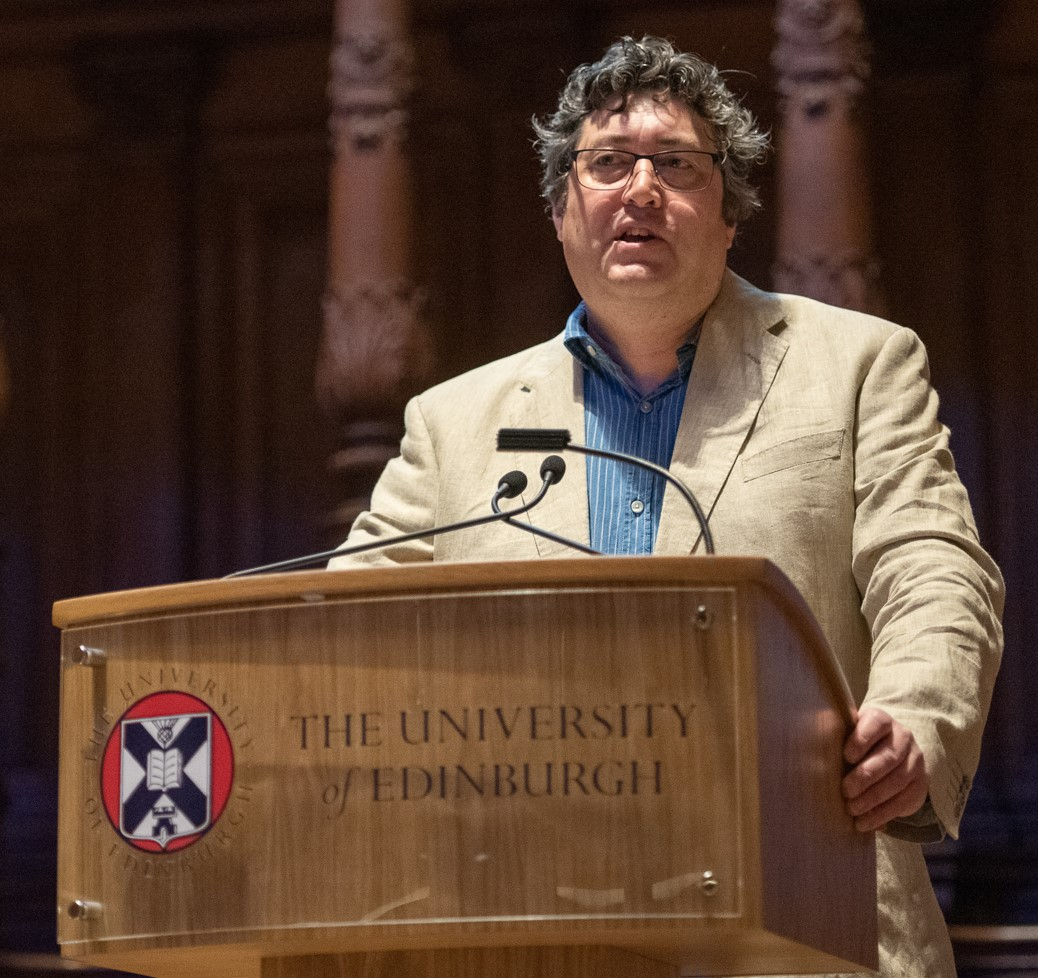
- Born: 23 June 1967; England
- Education: Goldsmiths' College, University of London; Queen Mary, University of London
- Occupation(s): Professor of Literature, Culture, and History
- Website: https://www.brycchancarey.com

Brycchan Carey (born 23 June 1967) is a British academic and author with research interests in the environmental humanities and the cultural history of slavery and abolition. He was educated at Goldsmiths' College, University of London and Queen Mary, University of London, where he completed a doctorate on "The Rhetoric of Sensibility: Argument, Sentiment, and Slavery in the Late Eighteenth Century". He lectured at Kingston University from 2000 before taking up the role of Professor of Literature, Culture, and History at Northumbria University in 2016.

== Scholar ==
Carey has authored and edited several books and many articles on slavery and abolition. These include The Unnatural Trade: Slavery, Abolition, and Environmental Writing, 1650–1807 (2024), From Peace to Freedom: Quaker Rhetoric and the Birth of American Antislavery, 1658-1761 (2012), and British Abolitionism and the Rhetoric of Sensibility: Writing, Sentiment, and Slavery, 1760-1807 (2005), as well as an edition of The Interesting Narrative of the Life of Olaudah Equiano, or Gustavus Vassa, The African (2018).

In addition to The Unnatural Trade, his published research in the environmental humanities includes work on bull-baiting in the eighteenth-century, ecocritical essays on Gilbert White and Oliver Goldsmith, and a collection of essays on birds in eighteenth-century literature (2020). In 2022, he was awarded a prestigious three-year British Academy/Wolfson Professorship to research The Parish Revolution: Parochial Origins of Global Conservationism.

Carey makes his academic research available to a broad public audience through a website first created in the 1990s. This is noted for its information on Olaudah Equiano and Ignatius Sancho and also offers biographies of many British abolitionists, full texts of eighteenth and nineteenth-century antislavery poems, and information and literary resources for several places including Cornwall and Cambridgeshire.

Carey is an active participant in British scholarly societies. He was President of the British Society for Eighteenth-Century Studies in 2021-24. He was a founder and, in 2011-2014, the first president of The Literary London Society. He was President of the UK and Ireland branch of the Association for the Study of Literature and Environment from 2015 to 2019. He is a fellow and, in 2021-24, was a Council Member of the Linnean Society of London.

== Books ==
- The Unnatural Trade: Slavery, Abolition, and Environmental Writing, 1650–1807. New Haven: Yale University Press. 2024. ISBN 9780300224412.
- Birds in Eighteenth-Century Literature: Reason, Emotion, and Ornithology, 1700-1840. New York and London: Palgrave Macmillan. 2020. ISBN 9783030327910. (Edited with Sayre Greenfield and Anne Milne)
- Literary Histories of the Early Anglophone Caribbean: Islands in the Stream. New York and London: Palgrave Macmillan. 2018. ISBN 9783319715926. (Edited with Nicole N. Aljoe and Thomas W. Krise)
- Olaudah Equiano, The Interesting Narrative. Oxford: Oxford University Press. 2018. ISBN 9780198707523. (Edited with an introduction, notes, and index)
- Quakers and Abolition. Champaign: University of Illinois Press. 2014. ISBN 978-0-252-03826-6. (Edited with Geoffrey Plank)
- From Peace to Freedom: Quaker Rhetoric and the Birth of American Antislavery, 1658-1761. New Haven: Yale University Press. 2012. ISBN 9780300180770.
- Slavery and the Cultures of Abolition: Essays Marking the British Abolition Act of 1807 (Essays and Studies in Romanticism Series, 2007). Woodbridge: Boydell and Brewer. 2007. ISBN 978-1-84384-120-3. (Edited with Peter Kitson)
- British Abolitionism and the Rhetoric of Sensibility: Writing, Sentiment, and Slavery, 1760-1807. Basingstoke: Palgrave Macmillan. 2005. ISBN 1-4039-4626-4.
- Discourses of Slavery and Abolition: Britain and its Colonies, 1760-1838. Basingstoke: Palgrave Macmillan. 2004. ISBN 1-4039-1647-0. (Edited with Markman Ellis and Sara Salih)
