= Gene Hatfield =

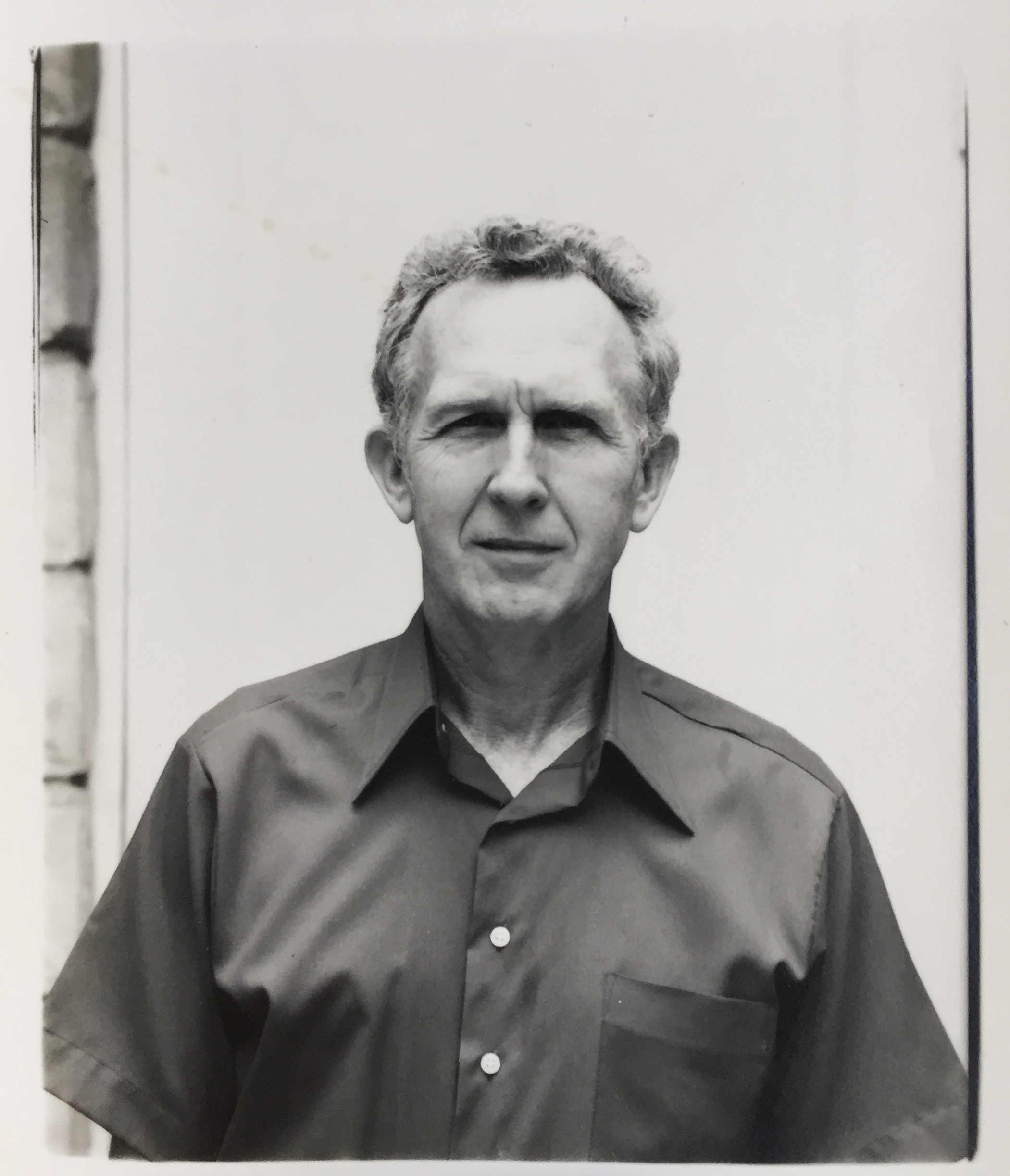
Lester Gene Hatfield

Lester Gene Hatfield, who went by the mononym Gene, was an artist and professor at the University of Central Arkansas (UCA) in Conway, Arkansas. He was born on November 23, 1925, and died on February 18, 2017. Hatfield was recognized with several awards throughout his career, including the Arkansas Arts Council Governor's Lifetime Achievement Award, an Arkansas Senate Citation, and a Purple Heart for his service in World War II.

Hatfield was an artist who worked with various mediums including watercolor, oil, acrylic, pottery, stage sets, and sculpture. He was well known in Conway for his unique yard, which was adorned with sculptures made from various found objects such as bicycles, soda cans, mops, tin foil, and more. Hatfield's famous outdoor art environment was the result of over forty years of working with unconventional materials. His sculpture style incorporated elements of surrealism and folk art, while his paintings were influenced by traditional late-nineteenth-century artists like Paul Cézanne.

With a long tenure as a professor and contributor to UCA, Hatfield was an important part of Arkansas’ art culture.

== Early life and education ==
Hatfield was born on November 23, 1925, in Conway, Arkansas, to Lester and Gertrude Powers Hatfield. His father was a building contractor. The financial setback of the Great Depression caused the family to move from Conway to Mount Vernon, Arkansas, Lester and Gertrude's hometown. The Hatfield family returned to Conway in 1937. Hatfield graduated from Conway High School in 1942 and enrolled at Arkansas State Teachers College (which later became the University of Central Arkansas) in the fall of 1942. Hatfield was one of the few male students on campus, as he began school during World War II. After three semesters in college, Hatfield was drafted into the U.S. Army in January 1944. Hatfield completed his basic training at Fort Benning, Georgia, and received additional training at Fort Bragg, North Carolina. In September 1944, he was sent to France, where he landed at Marseille. His unit camped in a field outside Marseille until they were picked up by Army trucks and taken to the front lines. While in northern France, Hatfield's unit fought in the Vosges Mountains to the Rhine River. In April 1945, during combat, Hatfield suffered a severe shrapnel injury from an anti-tank grenade, which exploded in a tree near him. The shrapnel caused severe injuries to his face and just missed his left eye. At a field hospital near Stuttgart, Germany, a surgeon removed all the shrapnel. He was then sent to a hospital in Tuscaloosa, Alabama, where he recovered. For his injury Hatfield received the Purple Heart.

For his wartime service he also received the Bronze Star and a Medal of Meritorious Conduct. After he received an honorable discharge from the Army, Hatfield again enrolled in college and in the summer of 1947 he received a Bachelor of Science in Education from Arkansas State Teachers College. He then studied art in graduate school at the University of Northern Colorado in Greeley, Colorado, where he earned a Master of Arts degree in art.

== Career ==
Hatfield began his career as a professor of art at the University of Central Arkansas (UCA) on September 1, 1948. He was hired at an annual salary of $2,400. Marie Schichtl was the head of the UCA Department of Art at that time. Hatfield continued his education during the summer months, taking advanced classes in Saint Ives, England, and in Paris, Fontainebleau, and Aix-en-Provence, France. He had a long career teaching in the UCA Department of Art, spanning 37 years before retiring in 1985. In recognition of his contributions, the UCA Board of Trustees awarded Gene Hatfield the title of Distinguished Professor Emeritus of Art in 1995.

In 1957, Hatfield married Nicole Wable in Montreuil Sur-Mer, France, and together they had three children named Hadrian, Marc, and Mathilda. Both Hadrian and Mathilda received their degrees from the University of Central Arkansas, while Marc also attended college there before graduating from the University of Arkansas.

Even after retiring, Hatfield remained deeply interested in the University of Central Arkansas and its many events. He frequently visited the campus and engaged in conversations with professors and students, but his true passion remained art.

Following retirement, Hatfield became well known for his yard filled with sculptures surrounding his home on Donaghey Avenue. In a conversation with the author, Hatfield shared that he felt guided by angels when he painted portraits or worked on sculptures. He remained active in art until just a few months before his passing. Hatfield died on February 18, 2017, at the age of 91.
