= Hermana Ramarui =

Palauan poet and educator

Hermana Ramarui is a Palauan poet and educator.

== Biography ==
Ramarui is from Palau and studied English at the University of Guam.

After returning to Palau, Ramarui worked at the Ministry of Education (MOE) and taught at Palau High School in Koror City. As an educator, she contributed to the creation of the Palauan Cultural Profile Curriculum and Palauan Orthography to preserve Palauan language and culture.

Ramarui's poetry collection The Palauan Perspectives (1984) explored topics including colonialism, identity, the environment, traditions, war, and the United States nuclear presence in Micronesia. It was locally printed.
