= Early American Literature =

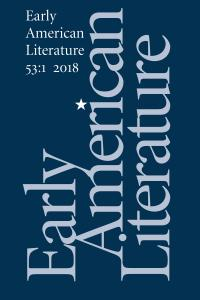
- Discipline: American literature
- Language: English
- Edited by: Marion Rust

Publication details
- Former name(s): Early American Literature Newsletter
- History: 1966–present
- Publisher: University of North Carolina Press on behalf of the Society of Early Americanists and the Forum on Early American Literature of the Modern Language Association (United States)
- Frequency: Triannual
- Impact factor: 0.3 (2022)

Standard abbreviations
- ISO 4: Early Am. Lit.

Indexing
- ISSN: 0012-8163 (print); 1534-147X (web)
- LCCN: sf77000022
- JSTOR: 00128163
- OCLC no.: 3141118

Links
- Journal homepage; Journal at the University of North Carolina Press; Access at Project MUSE

Early American Literature is a triannual peer-reviewed academic journal published by the University of North Carolina Press on behalf of the Society of Early Americanists and the Forum on Early American Literature of the Modern Language Association, covering on the study of early American literature (before about 1830), including Native American and French, British, Dutch, German, and Spanish colonial writing. It was established in 1966 as the Early American Literature Newsletter, obtaining its current title in 1968. The editor-in-chief is Marion Rust (University of Kentucky).

== Richard Beale Davis Prize ==
In 1983, the journal began awarding the Richard Beale Davis Prize, named after a prominent scholar of Southern literature and culture. It is awarded to the best article published within the journal each year.

== Abstracting and indexing ==
The journal is abstracted and indexed in:

- Arts and Humanities Citation Index
- ATLA Religion Database
- Current Contents/Arts & Humanities
- EBSCO databases
- International Bibliography of Periodical Literature
- Modern Language Association Database
- Scopus

According to the Journal Citation Reports, the journal has a 2022 impact factor of 0.3.
