= John Salas =

Uamanian educator, academic administrator, and politician (1948–2018)

John Camacho Salas (January 1948 – January 26, 2018) was a Guamanian educator, academic administrator, and politician. He served as Senator in the Legislature of Guam for two terms during the 25th and 26th Guam Legislatures from January 1999 until January 2003. Salas also served as the first provost of Vocational High School (now known as Guam Community College) and the President of the University of Guam.

== Biography ==
Salas graduated from Father Dueñas Memorial School in 1965 and received a bachelor's degree from Colorado State College (now called the University of Northern Colorado) in 1969. He received his doctorate from the University of Connecticut on the mainland. Following graduation from Connecticut, Salas became deputy director of the Guam Department of Education. He then became the first provost for the former Vocational High School, which was later renamed and is now known as present-day Guam Community College. Salas next became the vice president of human resources at Duty Free Shoppers for more than ten years.

He became the vice president of academic affairs at the University of Guam. He was later elevated to the President of the University of Guam.

Salas, a Republican, was elected to the Legislature of Guam in 1998 and won re-election in 2000. He served as a Senator for two terms from January 1999 until January 2003 in the 25th and 26th Guam Legislatures. He became chairman of the Legislature's Committee on Judiciary.

He returned to the University of Guam as a professor of tourism after leaving the Legislature in 2003.

Salas died from complications of diabetes at Guam Memorial Hospital in Tamuning on January 26, 2018, at the age of 70. He was survived by his wife of 46 years, Leslie Goodson, and two children, Jason and Stacy. His state funeral was held at the Guam Congress Building and the Dulce Nombre de Maria Cathedral Basilica on February 5, 2018.
