= Thomas W. Krise =

American academic, military officer

11th President of the University of Guam
- In office August 6, 2018 – August 6, 2023
- Preceded by: Robert A. Underwood
- Succeeded by: Anita Borja Enriquez

13th President of Pacific Lutheran University
- In office June 1, 2012 – June 1, 2017
- Preceded by: Loren Anderson
- Succeeded by: Allan Belton

6th Dean of the College of the Pacific
- In office January 1, 2008 – May 31, 2012
- President: Donald V. DeRosa, Pamela Eibeck
- Preceded by: Robert Cox (interim)
- Succeeded by: Caroline Cox (interim)

Personal details
- Born: Thomas Warren Krise; October 27, 1961 (age 64) Fort Sam Houston, San Antonio, Texas, U.S.
- Spouse: Patricia L. Love (m. 1987)
- Education: United States Air Force Academy (BS); Central Michigan University (MSA); University of Minnesota (MA); University of Chicago (PhD)
- Profession: Professor, university administrator, military officer
- Website: www.uog.edu/administration/office-of-the-president/

Military service
- Allegiance: United States of America
- Branch/service: United States Air Force
- Years of service: 1983–2005
- Rank: Lieutenant Colonel
- Awards: Defense Meritorious Service Medal; Meritorious Service Medal (3); Air Force Commendation Medal; Combat Readiness Medal (2); National Defense Service Medal (2); Senior Missile Operations Badge; Public Affairs Badge

Academic background
- Thesis: Representations of the British West Indies from the Restoration to the American Revolution: Prolegomena to the field and a critical anthology of early Jamaica (1995)
- Doctoral advisors: Bruce Redford; Janice Knight

Academic work
- Discipline: English Literature
- Institutions: University of Central Florida; University of the Pacific; College of the Pacific; Pacific Lutheran University; University of Guam

Thomas W. Krise (born 1961) is an American academic, former university administrator, and retired military officer. He served as the 11th President of the University of Guam and as the 13th President of Pacific Lutheran University in Tacoma, Washington, United States.

== Early life and education ==
The son and grandson of U.S. Army medical service officers, he was born the youngest of three children of Elizabeth Ann Krise (née Bradt; 1928-2015) and Colonel Edward Fisher Krise (1924-2003) on October 27, 1961, at Fort Sam Houston in San Antonio, Texas, and raised in the U.S. Virgin Islands. Krise graduated in 1979 from All Saints Cathedral School on St Thomas, Virgin Islands. He earned a B.S. in history from the United States Air Force Academy, an M.S.A. in management from Central Michigan University, an M.A. in English from the University of Minnesota, and a Ph.D. in English in 1995 from the University of Chicago.

== Military career ==
He served more than twenty years on active duty in the U.S. Air Force, retiring with the rank of lieutenant colonel. He served as an ICBM flight commander in the Strategic Air Command, on the faculty of the Air Force Academy in Colorado Springs, as a senior military fellow of the Institute for National Strategic Studies in Washington, as vice director of the National Defense University Press, and as founder and first director of the Air Force Humanities Institute.

== Academic career ==
Formerly, he was dean of the College of the Pacific, the arts and sciences college of the University of the Pacific in Stockton, California, and Chair of the Department of English at the University of Central Florida in Orlando.

Krise was the founding president of the Early Caribbean Society, past president of the Society of Early Americanists, and a former Fulbright Scholar at the University of the West Indies in Jamaica. He has served as general editor of the McNair Papers monograph series, managing editor of War, Literature, and the Arts: An International Journal of the Humanities, and published numerous articles and other works, including Caribbeana: An Anthology of English Literature of the West Indies, 1657-1777 and Literary Histories of the Early Anglophone Caribbean: Islands in the Stream, the latter co-edited with Nicole Aljoe and Brycchan Carey.

== Personal life ==
Krise lives in St. Thomas, United States Virgin Islands, with his wife, retired automotive executive Patricia L. Krise (née Love), who served on the board of the Guam Council of the Arts and Humanities Agency.
