= Robert S. Frost =

American composer and music educator

Robert S. Frost (September 18, 1942 – February 18, 2013) was an American composer and music educator. He held degrees in music education, including a doctorate.

Frost is known for his work as a string-ensemble composer who created intricate, complex arrangements. He wrote several music theory books and was friends with conductor Dennis Hiedel.

== Education ==
Frost received bachelor's and master's degrees in Music Education from Utah State University and his doctorate in Music Education from the University of Northern Colorado.

== Works ==
=== Original Pieces ===
- Illusions
- Pizzicato Pizazz
- Theme and Variations
- Caper Capriccioso
- Main Street March
- Pineapple Upside-Down
- Scherzo Pizzicato
- Fugue in F
- Accents
- Tales from Sherwood Forest (Piano part by Mary Elledge)
- Road Trip
- Ready, Set, Swing!
- Niltshi: The Voice of the Wind
- Cable Car Crossing
- Cardboard Regatta
- Grand Fanfare and Processional
- Bonjour!
- Sanseneon
- Classical Contours
- Fiesta Mexicana
- Snowflakes

=== Arrangements ===
- Jolly Old St. Nick
- Thirds a Plenty
- Danza Carnival
- Pomp and Circumstance
- Prelude and Fugue
- Classics a la Carte!
- Bon Voyage! Destination... Russia
- Bon Voyage! Destination... Canada
- Canzon and Fuga
- Merry go Rondo
- Two Seventeenth Century Dances
- Allegro Spiritoso
- Air with Variations

=== Series and Other Publications ===
- Artistry in Strings
  - Introduction to Artistry in Strings
  - Artistry in Strings Concert Selections
- Artistry in Ensembles
- All for Strings
- Solos and Etudes
- Viva Vibrato!
- String Techniques For Superior Musical Performance
- Rhythm Techniques For Superior Musical Performance
- Primo Performance
- Primo Encores
- Christmas Kaleidoscope
- Christmas Kaleidoscope II
- Especially for Strings
- First Things First
  - First things First S'more
- Sacred Settings
