= Lisa Poppaw =

American politician

District 2 Councilmember, City of Fort Collins, Colorado
- In office April 10, 2007 – April 21, 2015
- Preceded by: Karen Weitkunat
- Succeeded by: Ray Martinez

Personal details
- Born: Lisa Michelle Poppaw
- Party: Democratic
- Education: University of Northern Colorado
- Occupation: Executive Director at ChildSafe Colorado
- Website: www.lisapoppaw.org

Lisa Poppaw is a former Fort Collins, Colorado City Council member. She was first elected in the April 2007 municipal election to serve District 2. In April 2011 she was reelected to a second and final four-year term. On April 21, 2015, former Fort Collins Mayor Ray Martinez was sworn in to replace Poppaw.

== Biography ==
Poppaw is a resident of the English Ranch neighborhood in Fort Collins, Colorado. She is a graduate of the University of Northern Colorado in Greeley, Colorado and Woodland Park High School in Woodland Park, Colorado.

- City of Fort Collins Human Relations Commission (2006-2007)
- Chairperson, Linton Elementary Parent/Teacher Organization (2004-2007)
- Book Talk Co-Coordinator, Lesher Junior High, Fort Collins, CO (2006-2007)
- Poudre School District classroom volunteer, (1998–present)
- Neighborhood Watch Coordinator, English Ranch, Fort Collins, CO (2005-2006)
- Organizer, English Ranch Women’s Group (2004)
- Helped establish successful programs in Linton Elementary School; including one for new parents, and another to engage fathers in volunteering.
- Wrote successful grants for Linton elementary, creating a positive after-school academic and social activity program.

Poppaw currently works as Executive Director at Foundation on Aging for Larimer County.

== Campaigns ==
Municipal elections for the City of Fort Collins are held on the first Tuesday after the first Monday in April of odd-numbered years. At each regular election, voters will choose a Mayor (who serves a two-year term) and three Councilmembers (who serve four-year terms). Although Poppaw is a registered Democrat, city elections are non-partisan, in which a candidate's political party affiliation does not appear on the ballot. Councilmembers are limited to serving two four-year terms.

Poppaw has run for city council twice, winning both times, and is term-limited from running again for council.

=== 2007 Election ===
In 2007, Poppaw won the District 2 council seat by 58 votes, defeating opponent Matt Fries.

Fort Collins, CO municipal election: April 3, 2007
Party	Candidate	Votes	%	±%
Non-Partisan	Lisa Poppaw	2,201	50.67%	+1.34
Non-Partisan	Matt Fries	2,143	49.33%	−1.34

=== 2010 Recall Attempt ===
In May 2010, members of a local 9-12 Project group called "We Will Not Fall Fort Collins" organized an attempt to recall Poppaw from office. It was estimated a recall election would have cost the city $50,000 to conduct.

To qualify a recall election for the ballot in Fort Collins, organizers must submit valid signatures from registered District 2 electors equal to 25% of the total votes cast in the 2007 election for city council. However, at the end of the required 30-day signature-collection period, organizers failed to submit any of the 1,086 signatures required to trigger the recall election.

Upon the failure of the recall attempt, Poppaw issued the following statement:

I’m proud of my service to the citizens of District 2 in Fort Collins and I thank them for their support. I have offered mainstream leadership for our district that keeps government accountable and transparent, protects our natural resources and local economy, and provides safe parks and neighborhoods for my constituents. Now let’s get back to the important work of addressing the community’s problems and making Fort Collins one of the best places to live in America.

=== 2011 Re-election ===
In April 2011, Poppaw was re-elected to a second four-year term, defeating Sue Pawlak.

Fort Collins, CO municipal election: April 5, 2011
Party	Candidate	Votes	%	±%
Non-Partisan	Lisa Poppaw	3,048	53.29%	+6.58
Non-Partisan	Sue Pawlak	2,672	46.71%	−6.58

== Council Service ==
=== Boards and Commissions ===
As a member of council, Poppaw serves on the following boards and commissions:

- Affordable Housing Board
- Community Development Block Grant Commission
- Golf Board
- Senior Advisory Board
- Ethics Review Board
- Housing Authority
- Legislative Review Committee
- Library Trustee Selection Committee
- Poudre Fire Authority Board of Directors

== See also ==
- Fort Collins, CO: Law and government
