= Chih-Fu Cheng =

National Taiwan Normal University vice president

Chih-Fu Cheng (鄭志富, born 1956) from Penghu, Taiwan, is currently the vice president of the National Taiwan Normal University (NTNU) and Distinguished professor at the Department of Physical Education and the Graduate Institute of Sport, Leisure, and Hospitality Management, NTNU. His field of interests include sport management and administration, sport marketing, and sport organization behavior.

Cheng graduated from NTNU in 1978 as a bachelor. He passed the high-level exam for civil service in 1982 and returned to NTNU for advanced studies in 1985 and graduated with a master's degree in 1988. In 1991 he was funded by the scholarship of the National Science Council (now the Ministry of Science and Technology (Republic of China)) to study at the University of Northern Colorado and obtained his doctoral degree in 1993. After returning to Taiwan, Cheng has been working as an associated professor and then a professor at NTNU. He has also served as the deputy director of the Sports Affairs Council, Executive Yuan (now the Sports Administration, Ministry of Education) (2000–2002), the dean of Academic Affairs at NTNU (2003–2004), the dean of the College of Sports and Recreation at NTNU (2005–2007), and the vice president of NTNU from 2010 till now.

Cheng has dedicated to the administration of sports and the academic studies of physical education for more than 30 years. He has been promoting the development and the administrative service of physical education. He has designed the policies of physical education for governmental sectors, organized national examinations and collegiate affairs, and assessed organizations of higher education. He has been awarded the Service Award by the Educational and Academic Association and the highest honor in education service in Taiwan, the Educational Award in 2002. His dedication to the academic research of physical education has also earned him the “Leadership and Contribution” award in 2002 and the Biennial Outstanding Contribution Award in 2005 by International Council for Health, Physical Education, Recreation, Sport & Dance, ICHPER-SD.

In 2013, Cheng was invited to chair the compilation the Sports White Paper (體育運動政策白皮書) for the Sports Administration, Ministry of Education. His ten-year vision for the development of physical education in Taiwan has received acclaims from the academia both in Taiwan and overseas and won the “Cultivation Award for Academic Groups in Physical Education” in 2014. Over the years his academic achievements in the administration and management of sports has been recognized with his administrative services and academic endeavors.

== Education ==
- 1993 Doctor of Education in Sport Administration, University of Northern Colorado, U.S.A.

-1988 Master of Education (Physical Education), National Taiwan Normal University, Taiwan, NTNU, R.O.C.

-1978 Bachelor of Education (Physical Education), National Taiwan Normal University, Taiwan, NTNU, R.O.C.

== Positions ==
-1997~Present, Professor, National Taiwan Normal University

-2006~2008, Dean, the College of Sports and Recreation, National Taiwan Normal University

-2005~2008, President, the National Society of P.E. of R.O.C.

-2003~2004 Dean of Academic Affairs, NTNU

-2003~2004, Vice President; the Asian Association for Sport Management

-May 2000~January 2002, Deputy Director, the Sports Affairs Council, Executive Yuan, R.O.C.

-1997~May 2000, Director, the Physical Education R&D Center, NTNU

-1994~1997, Associate Professor, NTNU

-1990~1994, Instructor; NTNU
