= Elizabeth Diaz Rechebei =

Northern Mariana Islander academic

Elizabeth Diaz Rechebei (born 1949) is a Northern Mariana Islander academic. One of the first Chamorro women to receive a graduate education, she went on to hold several educational leadership roles on the islands, including director of the Trust Territory of the Pacific Islands' Department of Education and head of the Northern Mariana Islands' public school system.

== Early life and education ==
Elizabeth Diaz Rechebei was born on Saipan in 1949. She was the first child of six born to a Chamorro father, Francisco Diaz, and a Japanese mother, Reiko Tanaka Diaz. Elizabeth grew up in the village of Chalan Kanoa and attended Saipan's Mount Carmel School, graduating in 1968 alongside future politician Felicidad Ogumoro. As a high school student, she worked as a clerk for the Congress of Micronesia.

In a fairly uncommon move for women in her community at the time, she enrolled at the University of Guam, becoming one of the first two Micronesians to receive a scholarship from the Guamanian government. In 1972, she graduated with a psychology degree. After working for two years, she pursued graduate studies at the University of Hawaii, completing a master's in educational psychology in 1976, which made her one of the first women in the Northern Mariana Islands to earn a master's of arts. Decades later, she went back to school and earned a doctorate of education from the University of California, San Diego, in 2003.

== Career ==
After graduating from the University of Hawaii, Rechebei returned home and began what would become a long career with the Trust Territory of the Pacific Islands' Department of Education. After around a decade of working for the Education Department, overseeing testing across the territory and developing a local achievement testing system, she was appointed as the department's deputy director. Shortly thereafter, in 1984, she was promoted to director of the Department of Education, becoming the first woman and the youngest person to fill the role. She remained in the position until the dissolution of the Trust Territory in 1987. She later became director of the Northern Mariana Islands' public school system, but was removed in 1991 amid a teacher strike. After finishing her career as a public servant, she went into private consulting.

Rechebei is also known for her 1997 survey of Palauan history, History of Palau: Heritage of an Emerging Nation, written in collaboration with historian Samuel F. McPhetres. She later helped lead an effort to update the Chamorro–English Dictionary. In 2009, she received a Governor's Humanities Award for her efforts to preserve local culture.

Over several decades, she has worked with various regional organizations and served on different boards across the islands seeking to improve educational access and gender equity, including the Northern Marianas College Board of Regents and the Commission of the islands' public school system. She also helped establish the first public library in the Northern Mariana Islands and the NMI Museum of History and Culture.
