= Elaine Treharne =

Welsh historian and academic

professor Elaine Treharne FSA FRHistS FLSW
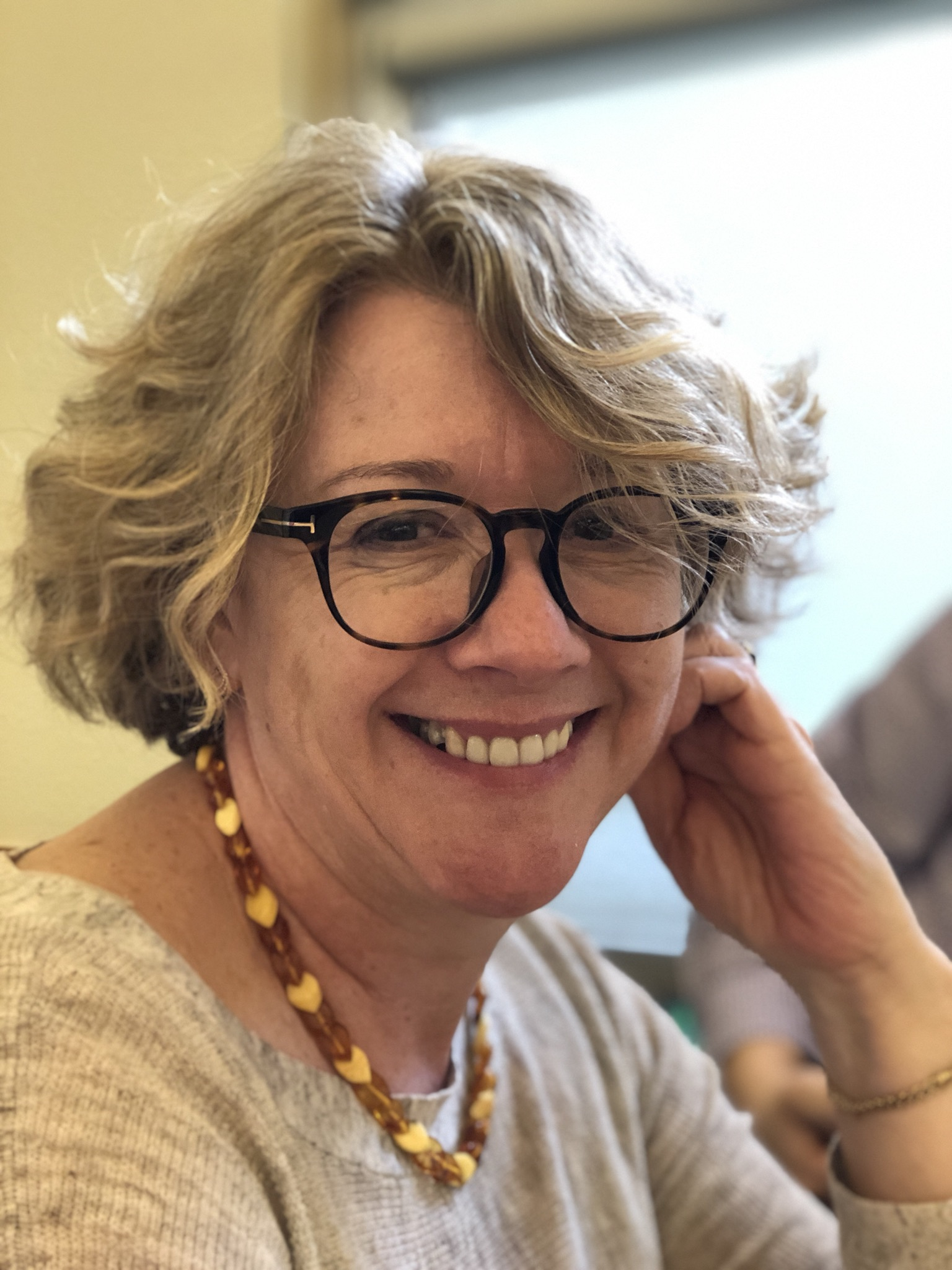
- Treharne in 2019
- Born: 1964 (age 61–62); Aberystwyth, Wales

Academic background
- Education: University of Manchester; University of Liverpool
- Thesis: Corpus Christi College, Cambridge, 303, and the Old English Lives of Saints Margaret, Giles, and Nicholas (1992)
- Doctoral advisor: D. G. Scragg

Academic work
- Discipline: History
- Sub-discipline: Early medieval history; History of the book; Old English; Manuscript studies
- Institutions: University of Leicester; Stanford University

Elaine M. Treharne was born in Aberystwyth, Wales, in 1964. She is a Senior Associate Vice Provost for Undergraduate Education and the Roberta Bowman Denning Professor of the Humanities, Professor of English, Courtesy Professor of German Studies and of Comparative Literature, and a Bass Fellow in Undergraduate Education at Stanford University. She was at the University of Leicester for eighteen years as a lecturer, then professor, head of department, and dean, before emigrating to the USA. She is a Welsh medievalist, focusing on Manuscript Studies, Early English literature, and the History of Text Technologies, particularly of the handmade book. She led Stanford University's online courses on manuscript study entitled Digging Deeper. She is a qualified archivist, and a Fellow of the Society of Antiquaries a Fellow of the Royal Historical Society, and an Honorary Fellow of the English Association, for whom she was also the first woman chair and President from 2000 to 2005. Treharne was made a Fellow of the Learned Society of Wales in April 2020. She is the President of the Teachers of Old English in Britain and Ireland (2022–2025).

== Monographs ==
- Perceptions of Medieval Manuscripts: The Phenomenal Book (2021)
- When is a Book Not a Book?
- Through Conquest: the Politics of Early English, 1020 to 1220 (2012)

== Editions, co-authored books, and co-edited volumes ==
- (with Benjamin Albritton, Deadra Fuzzell, Luca Messarra and Lauren Selden) The Handmade Book (2022)
- (with Orietta Da Rold) Cambridge Companion to British Medieval Manuscripts (2020)
- (with Benjamin Albritton and Georgia Henley) Medieval Manuscripts in the Digital Age (2020)
- (with Claude Willan) Text Technologies: A History (2019)
- (with Greg Walker) Textual Distortion (2017)
- (with David F. Johnson) Reading Medieval Literature: Interpretations of Old and Middle English Texts (2005)
- (with Susan Rosser) Early Medieval English Texts and Interpretations: Studies Presented to Donald G. Scragg (2003)
- Writing Gender and Genre in Medieval Literature: Approaches to Old and Middle English Texts, Essays and Studies (2002)
- (with Phillip Pulsiano) The Blackwell Companion to Anglo-Saxon Literature (2001)
- (with Phillip Pulsiano) Anglo-Saxon Manuscripts and Their Heritage (1998)
- The Old English Life of St Nicholas with the Old English Life of St Giles (1997)

== Textbooks and anthologies ==
- (with Greg Walker)The Oxford Handbook of Medieval Literature (2010)
- Old and Middle English, An Anthology, 800–1450, 3rd ed. (2009)
- Old and Middle English Poetry, Blackwell Essential Literature (2002)
- (with J. Coleman) A History of English Language: Sourcebook (1998)

== Introductory books ==
- Medieval Literature : A Very Short Introduction (Oxford University Press, 2015)
