= Mount Carmel School (Northern Mariana Islands) =

Location
- Knight Street, Chalan Kanoa, Saipan; Saipan; Northern Mariana Islands; 15.1513511°N 145.70332340000004°E

Information
- Religious affiliation: Catholic
- President: John Blanco
- Principal: Filmah Buenaflor
- Website: mountcarmelsaipan.com

Mount Carmel School is a private Catholic school in Chalan Kanoa, Saipan, Northern Mariana Islands. It serves grades Pre-K to 12. It is Saipan's sole Catholic school.

It opened in 1953.

On October 24, 2018, Mount Carmel School has suffered extensive damage caused by strong winds from Typhoon Yutu.

== Notable alumni ==
- Benigno Fitial
- Juan Pan Guerrero
- Eloy Inos
- Felicidad Ogumoro
- Elizabeth Diaz Rechebei
- Richard Steele (footballer)
