= Ed Cox (poet) =

American poet

- Born: July 6, 1946
- Died: September 1, 1992 (aged 46)
- Writing career
- Genre: Poetry

Ed Cox (July 6, 1946 in Washington, D.C. – September 1, 1992) was an American poet.

He served in the U.S. Navy. He studied at the University of Maryland with Rudd Fleming and Roderick Jellema. He worked for the U.S. Association for the United Nations High Commissioner for Refugees.

He read at Mass Transit, at the Community Book Shop on P Street. He lived at 1345 Saratoga Ave. NE from 1959 to 1964, and 1920 S Street NW,4110 Emery St NW, and 1301 15th St. NW #720 in the 1980s. His papers are held by American University.

== Awards ==
- 1982 D.C. Commission on the Arts and Humanities fellowship
- 1987 PEN American Center
- 1987 American Poets Fund of the Academy of American Poets
- 1989 Lyndhurst Prize, by the Lyndhurst Foundation

== Works ==
- Blocks. Washington, D.C.: Some of Us Press, 1972.
- Waking. San Francisco: Gay Sunshine Press, 1977.
- Collected Poems. Arlington, VA: Paycock Press, 2002. ISBN 0-931181-10-0

== Editor ==
- Seeds and Leaves (1977)
- Some Lives (1984)

== Reviews ==
- "Poems of the Quotidian World", Oyster Boy Review 16, Reginald Shepherd, Winter 2002
- Clark, Philip (April 1, 2002). "Dead poet speaking". Lambda Book Report. Archived from the original on October 10, 2012 – via HighBeam Research.
