= Edward G. Cox =

American linguist

Edward Godfrey Cox (1876–1963) was an American linguist and yachtsman. He was born in Ottawa, Ohio and became a professor at Cornell University and then University of Washington. He was the editor of the journal Modern Language Quarterly from 1943 to 1963, when he died.
