= University of Guam =

Public university in Mangilao, Guam

- Unibetsedåt Guåhan
- Other name: U.O.G.
- Former names: Territorial College of Guam (1952-1963); College of Guam (1963-1968)
- Motto: Excelsior
- Motto in English: Ever Upward
- Type: Public land-grant university
- Established: June 30, 1952; 74 years ago
- Academic affiliations: Sea-grant; Space-grant
- Endowment: $13.5 million
- President: Anita Borja Enriquez
- Faculty: 180
- Students: 3,904
- Location: Mangilao, Guam, United States; 13°26′N 144°48′E
- Campus: Rural area (about 161 acres)
- Vision: Ina, Deskubre, Setbe; To Enlighten, To Discover, To Serve
- Colors: Green and white
- Nickname: Tritons
- Website: uog.edu

University of Guam (Chamorro: Unibetsedåt Guåhan) (U.O.G.) is a public land-grant university in Mangilao, Guam. It is accredited by the Western Association of Schools and Colleges and offers thirty-four degree programs at the undergraduate level and eleven at the master's level. Of the university's 3,387 students, 94% are of Asian-Pacific Islander ethnicity and nearly 72% are full-time (fall 2012 figures). A full-time faculty of about 180 work at the university.

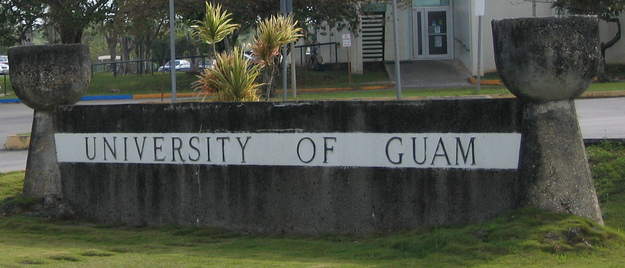
Entrance to the University of Guam campus.

== History ==
University of Guam was founded in 1952 as a two-year teacher-training school known as the Territorial College of Guam, established by Governor Carlton Skinner. In 1960, the college moved to the present campus in the central district of Mangilao. In 1965, the college was accredited as a four-year, degree granting institution. By 1968, enrollment had reached 1,800 students while staff and faculty totaled more than 130. It was designated as a land grant institution by the United States Congress in 1972. Throughout the 1970s, Women's rights advocate and pioneer Maryly Van Leer Peck founded the Community Career College which became Guam Community College. She would later create the Business and Applied Technology programs, among others. She was also a chairman on its board.

=== Presidents ===
- Antonio C. Yamashita (1964–1970)^
- Pedro C. Sanchez (1970–1974)
- Antonio C. Yamashita (1974–1977)^
- Rosa Roberto Carter (1977–1983)
- Jose Q. Cruz (1983–1987)
- Wilfredo P. Leon Guerrero (1988–1993)^
- John C. Salas (1993–1996)
- Jose T. Nededog (1996–2000)
- Harold L. Allen (2001–2008)^
- Robert A. Underwood (2008–2018)^
- Thomas W. Krise (2018–2023)
- Anita Borja Enriquez (2023-present)

^ Indicates President Emeritus status conferred by UOG Board of Regents

== Colleges and schools ==
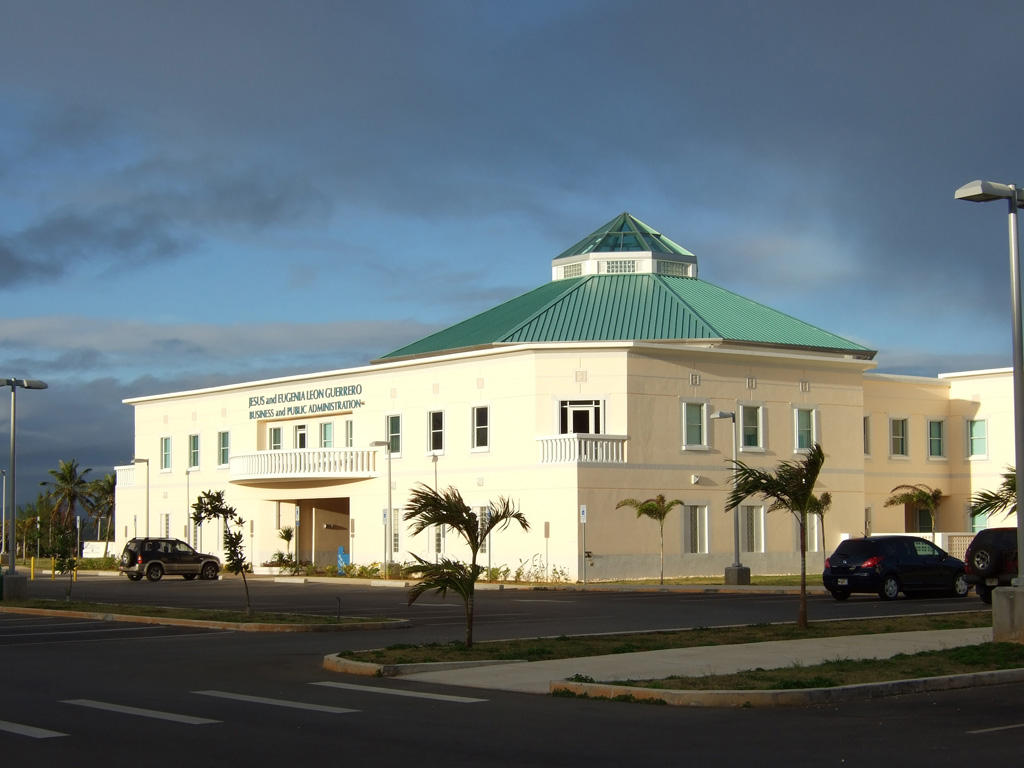
Eugenia Leon Guerrero Business & Public Administration Building

The University of Guam offers bachelor's degrees in thirty-two areas, master's degrees in 20 areas, and one doctoral degree in education. The University is organized into the following academic units:

- College of Liberal Arts and Social Sciences (CLASS)
  - Division of Humanistic Studies
  - Department of English and Applied Linguistics (D.E.A.L.)
  - Division of Social and Behavioral Sciences
  - Division of Communication and Fine Arts
- College of Natural and Applied Sciences (CNAS)
  - Department of Mathematics and Computer Science
  - Division of Natural Sciences
  - Division of Agriculture and Consumer Sciences
  - Army ROTC
- School of Business and Public Administration (SBPA)
  - Division of Business
  - Division of Public Administration
- School of Education (SOE)
  - Division of Advanced Education and Research Services
  - Division of Professional Teacher Preparation
- School of Engineering
  - Civil Engineering Program
  - Pre-Engineering Program
- School of Health (SOH)
  - Health Sciences Program
  - Nursing Program
  - Social Work Program

== Outreach ==
The University of Guam offers a variety of community outreach for students to build the community, help those in need and to be able to express their culture.

- Center for Island Sustainability
- Guam Procurement Technical Assistance Center (PTAC)
- Guam System for Assistive Technology (GSAT)
- Isla Center for the Arts
- Pacific Small Business Development Center
- COLL
- Field House
- Fine Arts
- Herbarium
- Summer Camps
  - Adventure Sports Camp
  - 4H Summer Workshops
  - Triton Athletics Summer Camps
- Violence Against Women Prevention Program

== Clubs ==
The University offers up to 54 extracurricular clubs that students ranging from first years to seniors could join. Some examples include:

- Triton Changemakers
- Linguistics and Language Appreciation Society
- Iakwe Club
- Pre-Optometry Professional Society
- Marianas History Club

== Athletics ==
The University of Guam athletics was shut down for 16 years but in 2019 sports started to begin again, only to be postponed during COVID-19. Since then sports have been slowly coming back and as of 2025 there are around 9 sports for students to join that include:

- Men's Baseball
- Men's Basketball
- Men's Soccer
- Men's Volleyball
- Women's Basketball
- Women's Rugby
- Women's Soccer
- Women's Volleyball
- Co-ed Esports

== Notable alumni ==
- Joseph Franklin Ada, Former Governor of Guam.
- Katherine B. Aguon, Guamanian educator and politician.
- Carmen Fernandez, Businesswoman, politician, and college administrator.
- Peter Sugiyama, member of the Senate of Palau
- Judith Won Pat, Speaker of the 30th Guam Legislature.
- Antoinette D. Sanford, Businesswoman and politician.
- Ray Tenorio, Lieutenant Governor of Guam.
- Vicente Ada, Guam Senator, Member of the Legislature of Guam
- Tan Siu Lin, Founder of Tan Holdings Corporation and Chairman of the Peking University Luen Thai Center for Supply Chain System R&D.
- Aline A. Yamashita, Guamanian educator and politician. Former Senator in the Guam Legislature.
- Amata Coleman Radewagen, Delegate to Congress, American Samoa.
- Hermana Ramarui, Palauan poet and educator
- Elizabeth Diaz Rechebei, educational leader in the Northern Mariana Islands
- James Moylan, current Delegate to the U.S. House of Representatives from Guam's at-large district

== Notable faculty ==
- Vicente T. Blaz, professor of law.
- Dirk Ballendorf, former Professor of Micronesian studies, Director of the Micronesian Area Research Center (1979-1984, 2004-2007).
- Benjamin Clemens Stone, British-American botanist.
- Tony Palomo, historian.
- Ansito Walter, former Governor of Chuuk State.
- Maryly Van Leer Peck. university president, engineer and first female dean
