= Anita Borja Enriquez =

Guamanian academic administrator

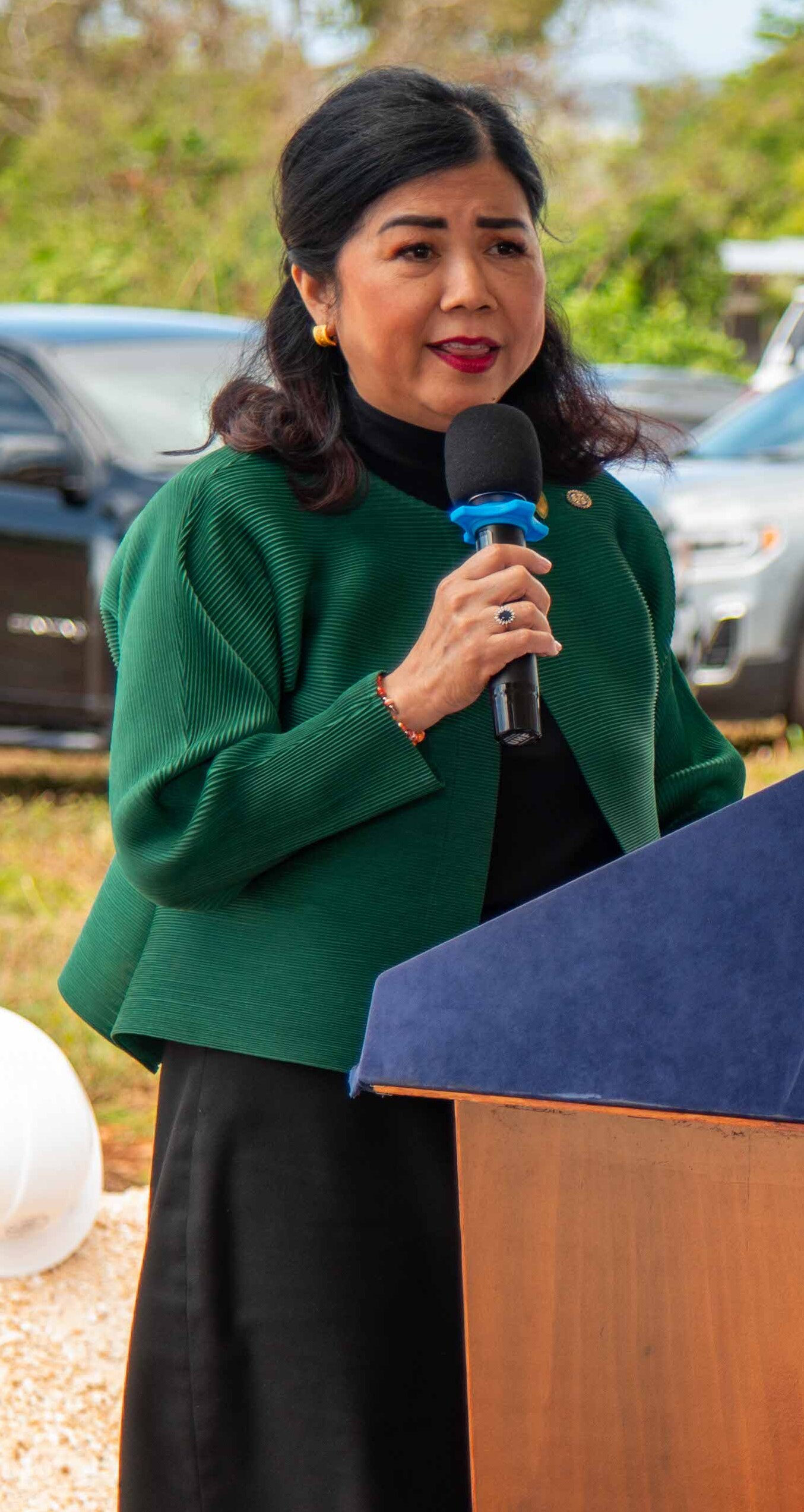
- Enriquez at a groundbreaking ceremony, 2025

President of the University of Guam
- Incumbent
- Assumed office August 5, 2023
- Preceded by: Thomas W. Krise

Personal details
- Education: University of Maryland, University College (BS); University of Guam (MBA); Alliant International University (DBA)

Anita Borja Enriquez is a Guamanian academic administrator who became the 12th president of the University of Guam in 2023. Her career at the university has included roles as senior vice president, provost, and dean of the School of Business and Public Administration.

== Early life and education ==
Enriquez experienced a poverty-stricken childhood in Hågat, Guam. She is a product of both public and private schools. Her family could not afford many books, so she frequently borrowed them from the Hågat Public Library to educate herself. In her youth, she cleaned restroom toilets in exchange for hot lunches and milk. From youth, Enriquez believed that higher education was critical to improving one's life.

Enriquez earned a B.S. in management from the University of Maryland, University College. She completed a M.B.A. from University of Guam. Enriquez earned a Doctor of Business Administration in International Business (Marketing) from Alliant International University. After completing her doctorate in 1995, she returned to Guam to fulfill a service obligation as a PROTECH recipient. Despite having a doctoral degree, she was initially only offered a position teaching typing, a situation that nearly led her to quit.

== Career ==
Enriquez held several key positions at the University of Guam (UOG). She served as the dean of the UOG School of Business and Public Administration for about a decade and later as senior vice president and provost. During her tenure, she has been credited with launching the professional MBA program and helping to raise the university's graduation rates.

In 2018, Enriquez was a finalist in the presidential search to find a successor for then-president Robert A. Underwood. She was not on the initial list of three finalists but was added after another candidate withdrew. Her addition followed concerns from students and community members that none of the initial candidates were from Guam or had a personal stake in the university. As the only local and internal candidate, Enriquez stated she had a "very small" learning curve and that her "heart and soul is for this island, and this region". At the time, she highlighted that 70 percent of UOG students required Pell Grant funding and that many dropped out due to financial struggles. Her 2018 platform included expanding funding opportunities through the U.S. Department of Education and increasing the university's presence in villages through certificate programs and expanded online classes in fields like cybersecurity.

In 2020, while serving as senior vice president, Enriquez was elected to a three-year term as a commissioner on the Western Association of Schools and Colleges Senior College and University Commission (WSCUC). Her term began on July 1. She was one of five new commissioners elected and served as the Pacific Basin representative with appointments to the Accreditation Policy and Procedure Committee and the International Accreditation Ad Hoc Committee.

=== Presidency of the University of Guam ===
On June 22, 2023, the University of Guam Board of Regents selected Enriquez to become the university's 12th president. The selection process began after the incumbent, Thomas W. Krise, announced his retirement. The applicant pool of 31 was narrowed to three finalists: Enriquez, Guam Community College president Mary Okada, and professor and attorney LeGene Quesenberry. Enriquez secured six of the nine regent votes.

Enriquez officially began her tenure on August 5, 2023. Her investiture ceremony was held on November 14, 2023, at the UOG Calvo Field House. As president, she stated her first moves would be to stabilize the institution and strengthen its core offerings. She outlined plans to work closely with community leaders and partners to ensure the university is responsive to the needs of the island.

== Personal life ==
Enriquez is married to Noel Enriquez and has three children and two granddaughters.

Enriquez is the author of a children's book titled "Neni Girl from Agat, Guam," which tells a story about growing up in the village of Hågat. The book, illustrated by local artist Cianna Yanger, was inspired by Enriquez's own experiences and heritage. The project expanded to include plush dolls of the main characters, created with the help of another local artist, Kaiulani Lujan. The book and dolls have been used in philanthropic efforts, with donations made to the island's foster children.

Enriquez has been active in Rotary International, helping students with book projects and coordinating major scholarships. Enriquez served as the president of the Rotary Club of Pago Bay and is active in the Guam Women's Chamber.
