= Peter Kitson =

British academic and author

Peter J. Kitson is a British academic and author. He is a Professor of Romantic Literature and Culture at the University of East Anglia where he teaches and researches the literature and culture of the British Romantic era.

== Career ==
His doctoral thesis at the University of Hull was on 'The Seventeenth-century Influence on the Early Religious and Political Thought of S. T. Coleridge, 1790-1805'. Kitson has authored and edited many books and articles on Romantic period literature, and the global contexts of romantic writing, including theories of race, slavery, and empire. Recently, he has been working extensively on Sino British cultural relations. His publications include the important Forging Romantic China: Sino-British Cultural Relations 1760--1840, (Cambridge University Press, 2014) and the multi-volume edition Slavery, Abolition and Emancipation: Writings in the British Romantic Period (Pickering & Chatto, 1998), which provided modern readers with a substantial body of eighteenth-century writings about race and slavery. He has received numerous research awards, including awards from the Leverhulme Trust, the Arts and Humanities Research Council, the British Academy, and the Carnegie Trust. He has been awarded research fellowships from the Huntington Library, the Japan Society for the Promotion of Science, and the Humanities Research Centre of the Australian National University. Professor Kitson has been elected as both Chair then President of the English Association and President of the British Association of Romantic Studies. He is an Honorary fellow of both associations. He also served as Head of School of English at UEA, the University of Dundee and the University of Wales, Bangor.

== Publications ==
Writing China: Essays on the Amherst Embassy (1816) and Sino-British Cultural Relations. Oxford: Brewer. 2016. ISBN 9781843844457.

Forging Romantic China: Sino-British Cultural Exchange, 1760-1840. New York: Cambridge University Press. 2013. ISBN 978-1-107-04561-3.

Romantic Literature, Race, and Colonial Encounter. New York: Palgrave. 2008. ISBN 978-1-4039-7645-1.

Slavery and the Cultures of Abolition: Essays Marking the British Abolition Act of 1807 (Essays and Studies in Romanticism Series, 2007). Woodbridge: Boydell and Brewer. 2007. ISBN 978-1-84384-120-3. (Edited with Brycchan Carey)

Literature, Science and Exploration in the Romantic Period: Bodies of Knowledge. Cambridge: Cambridge University Press. 2004. ISBN 978-0-521-03995-6. (Edited with Tim Fulford and Debbie Lee)

Placing and Displacing Romanticism. London: Ashgate. 2001. ISBN 978-0-7546-0602-4.

Slavery, Abolition and Emancipation: Writings from the Romantic Period 1780-1830. London: Pickering and Chatto. 1999. ISBN 978-1-85196-513-7. (Edited with Debbie Lee)

Romanticism and Colonialism: Writing and Empire, 1780-1830. Cambridge: Cambridge University Press. 1998. ISBN 978-0-521-59143-0. (Edited with Tim Fulford)

Coleridge, Keats and Shelley: New Macmillan Casebook. Basingstoke: Macmillan. 1996. ISBN 978-0-333-60890-6.

Coleridge and the Armoury of the Human Mind: Essays on His Prose Writings. London: Routledge. 1991. ISBN 978-0-7146-3426-5. (Edited with Thomas N. Corns)

Romantic Criticism, 1800-25 (Key documents in literary criticism). London: Batsford. 1989. ISBN 978-0-7134-5803-9.
