= Alfred Bendixen =

American academic

- Education: University of North Carolina
- Occupation: Academic
- Employer: Princeton University
- Known for: Founder and executive director of American Literature Association

Alfred Bendixen is the founder and Executive Director of the American Literature Association and a lecturer in the Department of Gender and Sexuality Studies at Princeton University.

Bendixen gained a Ph.D. at the University of North Carolina in 1979, with a thesis on "Americans in Europe before 1865: a study of the travel book". He held posts at Barnard College (1979–1988) and California State University, Los Angeles (1988–2005) before moving to Texas A&M University, where he served as the Associate Department Head of English (2007–2009) and a Professor of English (2006–2013). He now serves as a lecturer in the Department of Gender and Sexuality Studies at Princeton University, having previously been a lecturer in English at the same university.

His research has centered on the recovery of 19th-century literature and neglected genres, including the ghost story, detective fiction, science fiction, and travel writing.

== Selected publications ==
- Haunted Women: the best supernatural tales by American women writers (1985, F. Ungar, ISBN 9780804420525)
- Edith Wharton: New Critical Essays (1992, Garland Publishing, ISBN 9780824078485, with Annette Zilversmit)
- The Whole Family, new edition and introduction to this 12-author 1908 novel (2001, Duke University Press, ISBN 9780822328384)
- The Cambridge Companion to American Travel Writing (2009, Cambridge University Press, ISBN 9780521861090, with Judith Hamera)
- A Companion to the American Short Story (2010, Wiley-Blackwell, ISBN 9781405115438, with James Nagel)
- A Companion to the American Novel (2012, Wiley-Blackwell, ISBN 9781118220399)
- The Cambridge History of American Poetry (2014, Cambridge University Press, ISBN 9781107003361, co-edited with Stephen Burt)
- The Centrality of Crime Fiction in American Literary Culture (2017, Routledge: ISBN 978-0367878740), co-edited with Olivia Carr Edenfield
