= Society of Early Americanists =

The Society of Early Americanists (SEA) was founded in 1990 as an interdisciplinary association of scholars who study the literature and culture of the United States of America prior to about the year 1830. The non-profit society promotes the exchange of ideas and information among its members through a newsletter, which serves as the primary forum for members' concerns, through an electronic bulletin board and a website, and through biennial conferences and joint research projects.

The SEA is an affiliate of both the American Literature Association and the American Society for Eighteenth-Century Studies. Carla J. Mulford, an English professor and Franklin scholar, was the society's founding president.

== See also ==
- American Society for Eighteenth-Century Studies
