= Modern Language Quarterly =

- Discipline: Literary History
- Language: English
- Edited by: Marshall Brown

Publication details
- History: 1940-present
- Publisher: Duke University Press and University of Washington (USA)
- Frequency: Quarterly

Standard abbreviations
- ISO 4: Mod. Lang. Q.

Indexing
- ISSN: 0026-7929 (print); 1527-1943 (web)
- LCCN: 43005690
- OCLC no.: 1758463

Links
- Journal homepage; Online archive access; U of W journal homepage

Modern Language Quarterly (MLQ), established in 1940, is a quarterly, literary history journal, produced (housed) at the University of Washington and published by Duke University Press. The current editor is Jeffrey Todd Knight. Marshall Brown (University of Washington) was the editor from 1993 to 2021.

The first issue of a Modern Language Quarterly appeared in 1897 but in 1905 this journal became The Modern Language Review.

== Scope ==
The focus of MLQ is all topics in literary history, which includes all genres, and all time periods. Theory and argument are presented with a chronological organizational structure. Literary works are considered in the context of their time. The focus encompasses papers on literary change in literary practice and the profession of literature. Topical coverage includes how literary change, or literary history, relates to feminism, ethnic studies, cultural materialism, discourse analysis, and cultural critiques. Literature as it occurs in history is seen as the demonstration and agent of change. Understanding how literature has an impact is emphasized. Publishing formats are scholarly essays and book reviews.

== Abstracting and indexing ==
This journal is indexed in the following databases:

Thomson Reuters:

Arts & Humanities Citation Index
Current Contents / Arts & Humanities

Academic Abstracts Fulltext Elite & Ultra
Academic Research Library,
Academic Search Elite & Premier
Expanded Academic ASAP,
General Reference Center Gold & International
Humanities and Social Sciences Index Retrospective, 1907–1984,

Humanities Abstracts,
Humanities Full Text,
Humanities Index,
Humanities Index Retrospective, 1907–1984,
Humanities International Complete,
Humanities International Index,
Social Sciences Index Retrospective, 1907–1984

International Bibliography of Periodical Literature (IBZ),
Literary Reference Center,
Literature Resource Center,
Magazines for Libraries,
MLA Bibliography,
OmniFile - Mega Edition
Professional Development Collection (EBSCO)
Research Library

== Staff ==
The managing editor from 1943 to 1963 was Edward G. Cox.
