= University of Northern Colorado =

Public university in Greeley, Colorado, US

Coordinates: 40.404853°N 104.696741°W

- Former names: State Normal School of Colorado (1889–1935); Colorado State College of Education at Greeley (1935–1957); Colorado State College (1957–1970)
- Motto: Sapientia in aeternum est (Latin)
- Motto in English: Wisdom is Eternal
- Type: Public university
- Established: April 1, 1889; 137 years ago
- Academic affiliations: Space-grant
- Endowment: $131.4 million (2025)
- President: Kamel Haddad (interim)
- Provost: Nancy Marchand-Martella
- Faculty: 686
- Students: 8,869 (Fall 2024)
- Undergraduates: 6,480 (Fall 2024)
- Postgraduates: 2,389 (Fall 2024)
- Location: Greeley, Colorado, United States
- Campus: Suburban 260 acres (1.1 km^{2})
- Colors: Blue and gold
- Nickname: Bears
- Sporting affiliations: NCAA Division I FCS – Big Sky
- Mascot: Klawz the Bear
- Website: unco.edu

Academic rankings

National
- U.S. News & World Report: 352

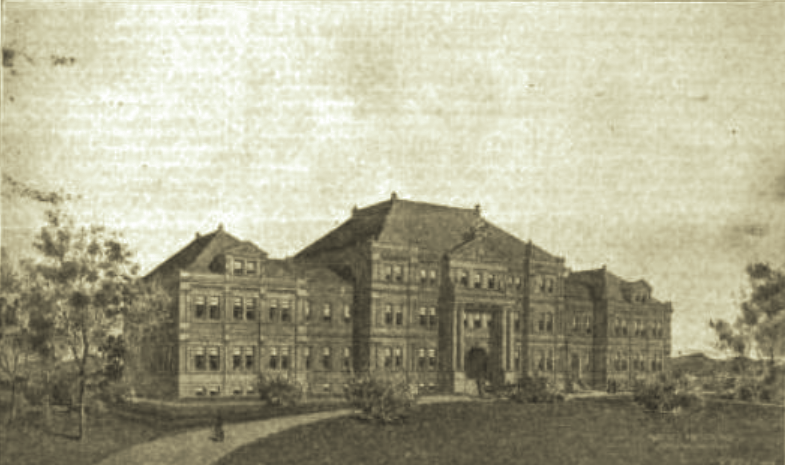
Normal School, Greeley, Colorado (1902)

West Campus, Northern Vision Sculpture. Bishop Lehr Hall is visible on the right, and McKee Hall of Education and Ross Hall of Science are on the left.

The University of Northern Colorado (UNCO or UNC) is a public university in Greeley, Colorado, United States. It was founded in 1889 as the State Normal School of Colorado and took on its current name in 1970. Approximately 10,000 students are enrolled in six colleges. Extended campus locations are in Loveland, Denver/Aurora, and Colorado Springs. The university has a long history in teacher education. UNCO's 19 athletic teams compete in NCAA Division I as members of the Big Sky Conference.

== History ==
On April 1, 1889, governor of Colorado Job A. Cooper (Note: There were 2 governors in 1889: Alva Adams ended his term January 8, 1889, and Job A. Cooper started his term on January 8, 1889.) approved senate bill 104 that officially established State Normal School of Colorado, with citizens of Greeley raising $11,175 to build the first building, Cranford Hall, named in honor of John P. Cranford who donated 21.3 acres of land for the school. Construction of Cranford Hall, as well as the east and central parts of the school were completed between 1890 and 1895, with the west wing being completed in 1902. The University opened on October 6th, 1890, with Thomas J. Gray acting as the university's first president, and only 4 instructors and 96 students attended the school. On June 5th, 1911, the institution changed its name to the Colorado State Teachers College with House bill 258. After this, the university changed its name three more times. On February 16th, 1935, it changed to Colorado State College of Education, at Greeley, on February 11th, 1957, it simplified to Colorado State College, and on May 1st, 1970, it changed to its current form.

=== Presidents ===
The university has had 13 presidents since its establishment:

- Thomas J. Gray — 1890–1891
- James H. Hayes — (interim) 1891, November 11, 1915 – 1916
- Zachariah Xenophon Snyder — 1891–1915
- John Grant Crabbe — Late summer 1916–1924
- George Willard Frasier — 1924–1947
- William Robert Ross — 1947–1964 (assumed office December 20, 1947)
- Darrell Holmes — 1964–1971
- Frank P. Lakin — 1969, 1971 (interim)
- Richard R. Bond — 1971–1981
- Charles Manning (acting) — 1981
- Robert C. Dickeson — 1981–1991
- Richard Davies (acting) — January 1 – August 29, 1987
- Stephen T. Hulbert (interim) — July 1 – September 30, 1991
- Herman Lujan — 1991–1996
- Howard Skinner (interim) — June 1996 – June 1998
- Hank Brown — July 1998 – June 2002
- Kay Norton — July 2002 – July 2018
- Andy Feinstein - July 2018 – present

== Campus ==
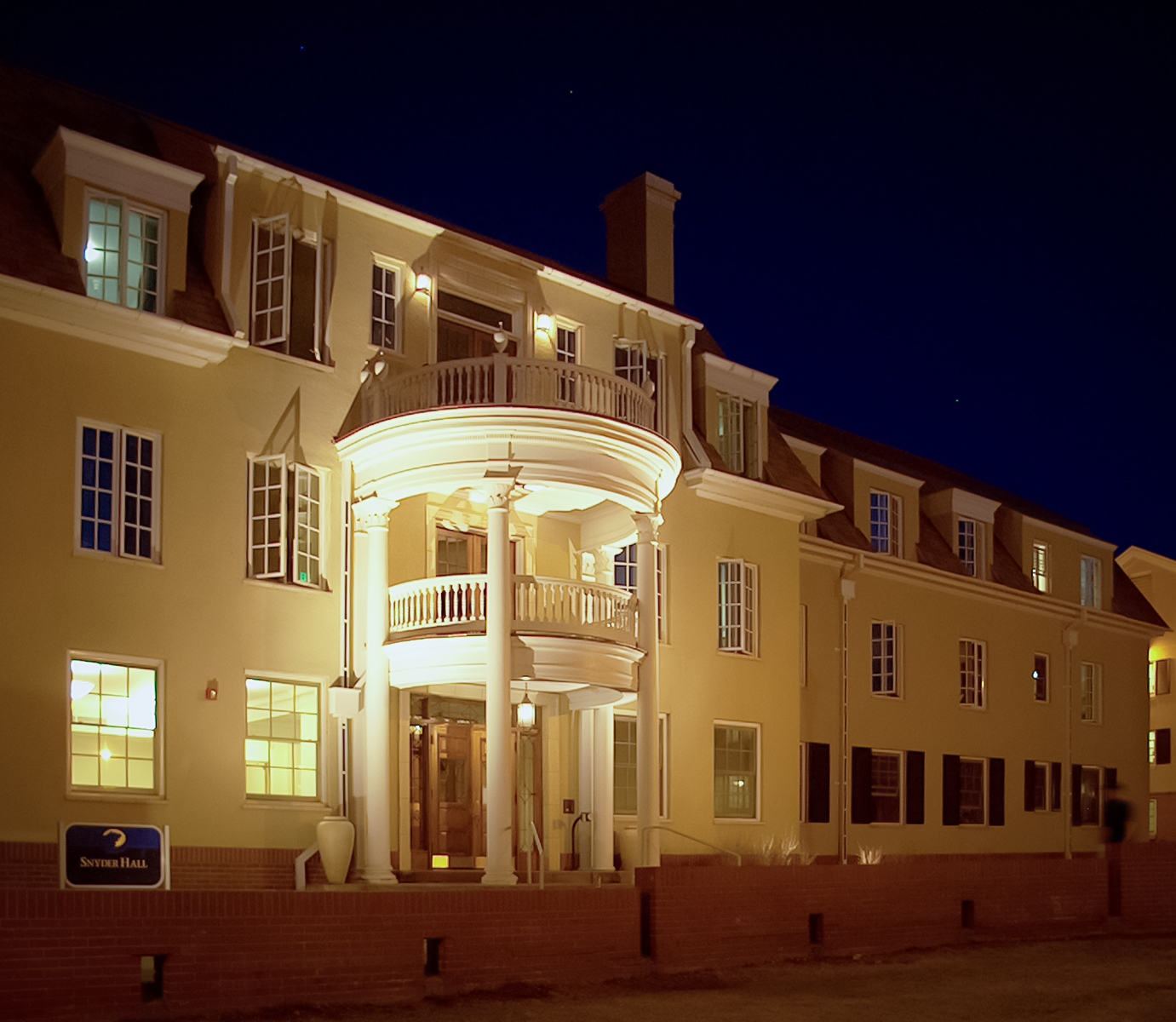
UNCO's Snyder Hall, a dormitory on Central Campus

The campus is divided into two main areas: central and west. UNCO's Central Campus includes the areas north of 20th Street and west of 8th Avenue in Greeley, Colorado. The residence halls on Central Campus have been designated a state historic district.

== Organization ==
The board of trustees for the university oversees the administration and approves the university annual budget. Several members of the university's administrative team are ex officio members of the board.

Undergraduate demographics as of Fall 2023
Race and ethnicity	Total
White	60%
Hispanic	26%
Two or more races	5%
Black	4%
Asian	2%
International student	1%
Unknown	1%
Economic diversity
Low-income (Note: The percentage of students who received an income-based federal Pell grant intended for low-income students.)	29%
Affluent (Note: The percentage of students who are a part of the American middle class at the bare minimum.)	71%

== Athletics ==
Sports teams at the school are called Bears. Northern Colorado joined the Big Sky Conference on July 1, 2006. The school mascot is Klawz the Bear and the school colors are navy blue and gold. The Fight Song is the "UNC Fight Song". Northern Colorado's Athletic Director is Darren Dunn.

A number of the university's alumni have gone on to have professional sports careers. Vincent Jackson attended and played football at Northern Colorado from 2001 to 2004 before being drafted by the San Diego Chargers in the 2005 NFL draft. Other football alumni of the school include punter Dirk Johnson, quarterback Kyle Sloter, safety Reed Doughty, and defensive lineman Aaron Smith.

Before upgrading to NCAA Division I in 2006, UNCO was a member of the Rocky Mountain Athletic Conference from 1923 to 1972 and the Great Plains Athletic Conference (1972–76). Following several years of being conference independent, the university joined the North Central Conference. The Bears have won two Division II Football National Championships in 1996 and 1997. On March 9, 2011, the Bears won the Big Sky Conference tournament championship in men's basketball, clinching a trip to the 2011 NCAA Men's Division I Basketball Tournament, the first in the school's history. The Northern Colorado men's baseball program also ranks among the top 15 schools for most all-time NCAA College World Series appearances, tied with the University of Oklahoma at ten appearances apiece. The Northern Colorado women's softball team appeared in the first eleven Women's College World Series ever held in 1969–1979, advancing to but losing the title game in 1974.

=== Mascots ===
The bear became UNCO's mascot in 1923. Before the school adopted the bear, athletes used the nickname "the Teachers." The bear was said to be inspired by a bear on top of an Alaskan totem pole donated by an 1897 alumnus in 1914. The totem pole was kept in the University Center, but under the federal Native American Graves Protection and Repatriation Act of 1990, the pole was reclaimed by the Tlingit in 2003.

== Notable people ==
=== Alumni ===
- List of University of Northern Colorado alumni

=== Faculty ===
- David Daniel, psychologist
