= 1897 United States Senate election in Idaho =

- January 12 – 28, 1897

Majority vote of legislature to win
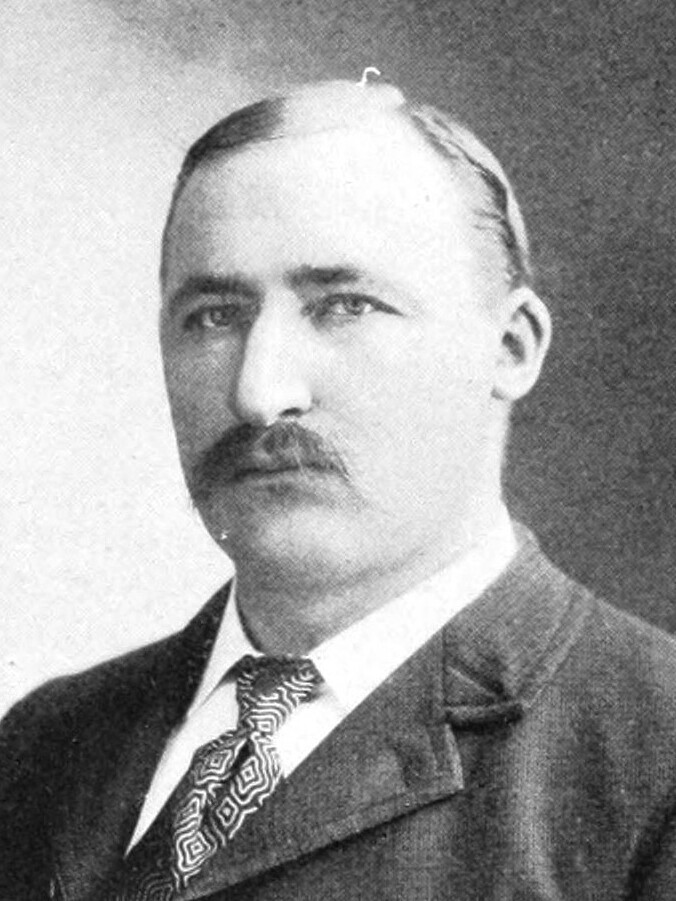

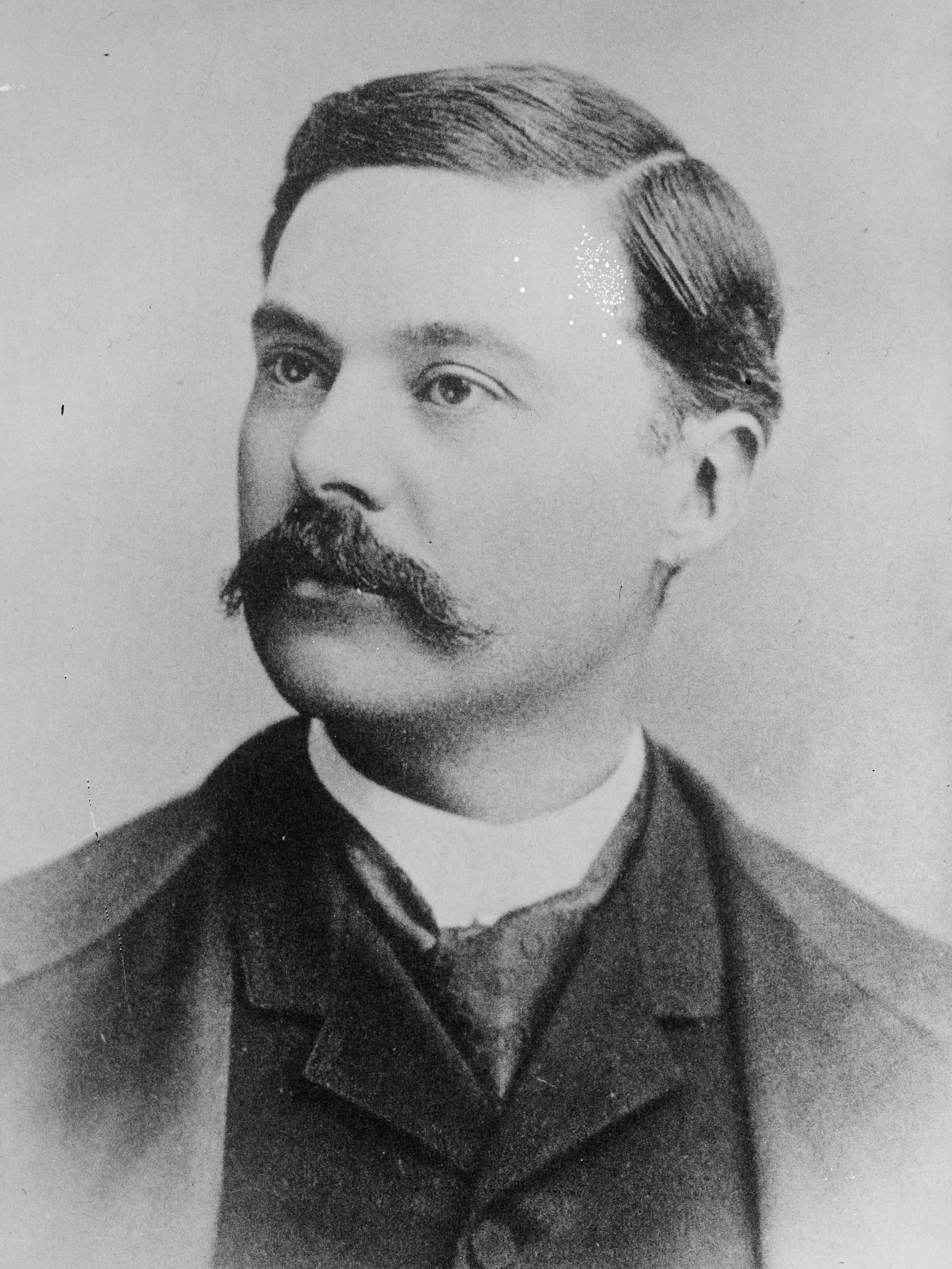
Nominee	Henry Heitfeld	Fred Dubois	Thomas F. Nelson
Party	Populist	Silver Republican	Populist
Legislature	39	30	1
Percentage	55.71%	42.86%	1.43%
Senator before election
Fred Dubois
Silver Republican
Elected Senator
Henry Heitfeld
Populist

The 1897 United States Senate election in Idaho was held over the course of 23 ballots from January 12 to January 28, 1897, by the Idaho Legislature to elect a U.S. senator (Class 3) to represent the State of Idaho in the United States Senate.

== Background ==
Silver Republican Fred Dubois had been elected to this seat in 1890 and his term was set to expire on March 3, 1897.

=== Composition of the legislature ===
Following the state election in November 1896, a coalition of 23 Populists and 22 Democrats won control of the legislature over 25 Republicans. The 4th Idaho Legislature met from January 4 to March 8, 1897, at Boise, Idaho.

== Candidates ==
Over the course of 23 ballots held from January 12 to January 28, 1897, 36 individuals received votes to be senator. The election required extensive balloting due to the failure of the Populist and Democratic caucuses to unite behind a candidate, despite Democrats generally voting for candidates who were members of the Populist Party.

=== Populist caucus ===
The Populist caucus united behind six different candidates over the course of balloting, with their chosen candidate receiving between 24 and 33 of the required 36 votes on the first 22 ballots:

- William H. Clagett (Pop), former Delegate from the Montana Territory, was the chosen candidate on the 1st, 2nd, 3rd, 7th, 8th, 16th, 17th, 20th, and 21st ballots
- Abraham J. Crook (Pop), 1892 Populist nominee for governor, was the chosen candidate on the 4th and 5th ballots
- Texas Angel (Pop), attorney, was the chosen candidate on the 6th ballot
- Frank Walton (Pop), editor of the Pocatello Advance, was the chosen candidate on the 9th, 10th, and 11th ballots
- James W. Ballantine (Pop), senator from Blaine County and 1894 Populist nominee for governor, was the chosen candidate on the 12th, 13th, 14th, and 15th ballots
- Henry Heitfeld (Pop), senator from Nez Perce County, was the chosen candidate on the 22nd and 23rd ballots

=== Republican caucus ===
The Republican caucus remained largely united behind their incumbent senator:

- Fred Dubois (SR), incumbent senator, was the chosen candidate on the 1st and 3rd through 23rd ballots
- Richard Z. Johnson (D), former territorial attorney general, was one of two competing candidates for Republican votes on the second ballot
- John W. Jones (D), receiver in the land office, was one of two competing candidates for Republican votes on the second ballot

=== Democratic caucus ===
From the 6th through the 22nd ballots, between 12 and 17 Democrats united behind one of three Populist candidates. On the 23rd ballot, a large enough faction of Democrats united with the Populists to elect Heitfeld as senator. The caucus's three candidates were:

- Thomas F. Nelson (Pop), senator from Latah County, was the chosen candidate on the 6th, 8th, 10th, and 14th through 22nd ballots
- George J. Lewis (Pop), newly elected secretary of state, was the chosen candidate on the 7th, 9th, 11th, and 13th ballots
- John C. Rogers (Pop), district attorney for the fourth judicial district, was the chosen candidate on the 12th ballot

=== Scattering votes ===
An additional 24 candidate received votes:

- James F. Ailshie (R), former regent of the University of Idaho
- John A. Bagley (R), 1896 Republican nominee for attorney general
- Vic Bierbower (R), 1896 Republican nominee for lieutenant governor
- J. H. Blair (R), attorney
- David H. Budlong (R), 1896 Republican nominee for governor
- C. W. Cooper (Pop), lumberman
- Charles A. Foresman (R), 1896 Republican nominee for superintendent of public instruction
- James L. Fuller (R), Lincoln County commissioner
- Isaac W. Garrett (R), 1896 Republican nominee for secretary of state
- Thomas L. Glenn (Pop), former member of the Kentucky Senate
- Weldon B. Heyburn (R), attorney and signatory of the Idaho Constitution
- Orville E. Jackson (Pop), attorney
- John T. Morrison (R), 1896 Republican nominee for Idaho's at-large congressional district
- George C. Parkinson (R), former senator from southeast Idaho
- William Y. Perkins (Pop), representative from Blaine County
- W. G. Piper (R), judge of the second judicial district
- Frank C. Ramsey (R), former state auditor
- James J. Rogers (Pop), representative from Canyon County
- Mrs. Norman M. Ruick (Pop), activist
- J. Ed Smith (Pop), attorney
- Drew W. Standrod (R), 1896 Republican nominee for the Idaho Supreme Court
- C. A. Warner (R), attorney
- William W. Watkins (R), surgeon
- John R. Wester (Pop), attorney

== Ballots ==
Candidates are listed in descending order of the maximum number of votes that they received. The necessary threshold for victory was 36 votes, except on the 6th ballot, when one legislator did not vote, lowering the threshold to 35 votes.

1897 United States Senator election result
#	1	2	3	4	5	6	7	8	9	10	11	12	13	14	15	16	17	18	19	20	21	22	23
Candidate	Jan. 12, 1897	Jan. 13, 1897	Jan. 14, 1897	Jan. 15, 1897		Jan. 16, 1897	Jan. 18, 1897		Jan. 19, 1897			Jan. 20, 1897		Jan. 21, 1897		Jan. 22, 1897	Jan. 23, 1897	Jan. 25, 1897		Jan. 26, 1897		Jan. 27, 1897	Jan. 28, 1897
Henry Heitfeld (Pop)																						25	39
William H. Clagett (Pop)	30	33	31	3	3	1	26	29	1	1	1	1	1	1	1	27	28			30	31		
Fred Dubois (SR)	26	3	26	26	26	25	25	25	25	25	25	26	26	26	26	26	26	26	26	26	26	27	30
Abraham J. Crook (Pop)	1		1	29	28									1									
Frank Walton (Pop)				2	2				28	28	28				1			29	29				
James W. Ballantine (Pop)	1											28	26	28	26								
Texas Angel (Pop)	2		1		2	24																1	
George J. Lewis (Pop)						1	17	1	14	1	14		14	1	1	1							
Thomas F. Nelson (Pop)	3	8	1	2	3	16		13		13				12	13	15	13	13	13	13	12	15	1
John W. Jones (D)		14																					
John C. Rogers (Pop)												13					2	1					
Richard Z. Johnson (D)		9				1	1	1	1	1	1												
C. W. Cooper (Pop)	1		6	2								1	1						1				
Thomas L. Glenn (Pop)	5																						
John R. Wester (Pop)			3	3	2								1		1								
James F. Ailshie (R)																	1						
John A. Bagley (R)						1																	
Vic Bierbower (R)									1	1	1												
J. H. Blair (R)																					1		
David H. Budlong (R)			1																				
Charles A. Foresman (R)							1	1															
James L. Fuller (R)																			1				
Isaac W. Garrett (R)				1	1																		
Weldon B. Heyburn (R)	1																						
Orville E. Jackson (Pop)					1																		
John T. Morrison (R)		1																					
George C. Parkinson (R)																1							
William Y. Perkins (Pop)					1																		
W. G. Piper (R)																		1					
Frank C. Ramsey (R)												1	1										
James J. Rogers (Pop)				1	1																	1	
Mrs. Norman M. Ruick (Pop)		1		1																			
J. Ed Smith (Pop)		1																					
Drew W. Standrod (R)														1	1								
C. A. Warner (R)																				1			
William W. Watkins (R)																						1	
not voting						1																	

== Aftermath ==
Heitfeld retired in 1903, remaining in the U.S. Senate until March 3, 1903.

== See also ==
- United States Senate elections, 1896 and 1897
