= James W. Ballantine =

American politician (1839–1907)

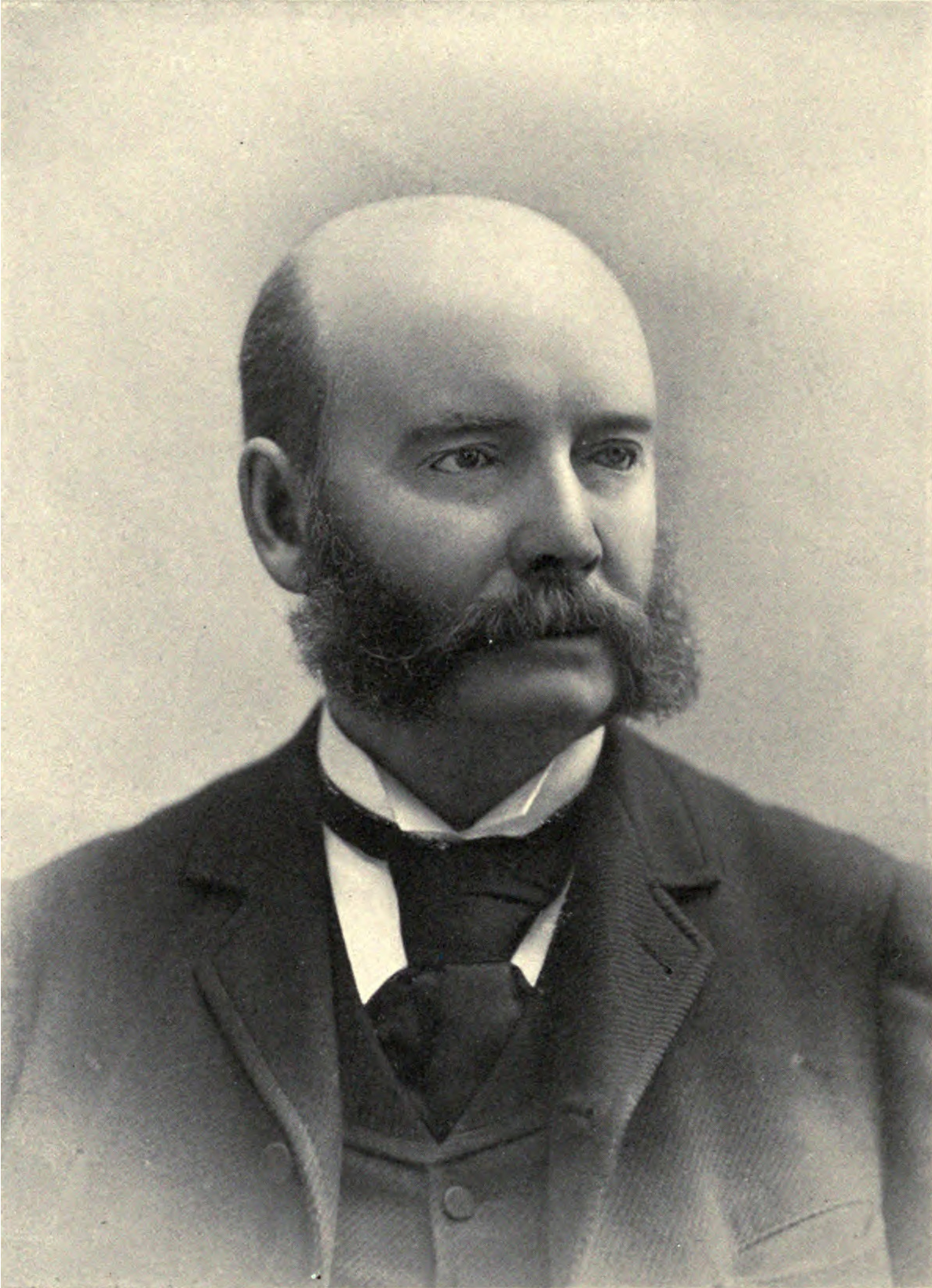

Mayor of Bellevue, Idaho
- In office 1905–1906

Member of the Idaho Senate
- In office January 4, 1897 – January 2, 1899
- Preceded by: William H. Watt (as senator from Alturas County)
- Succeeded by: Michael Carey
- Constituency: Blaine County
- In office January 7, 1901 – January 2, 1905
- Preceded by: Michael Carey
- Succeeded by: Fred W. Hastings

President Pro Tempore of the Idaho Senate
- In office 1901–1903
- Preceded by: Frank R. Gooding
- Succeeded by: John W. Brigham

Member of the Idaho House of Representatives
- In office January 2, 1893 – January 7, 1895 Serving with George J. Lewis
- Preceded by: Lyttleton Price; George E. Mills
- Succeeded by: Albert Wolters; Ervin W. Johnson
- Constituency: Alturas County

Delegate to the Idaho Constitutional Convention
- In office July 4, 1889 – August 6, 1889
- Constituency: Alturas County

Member of the Pennsylvania House of Representatives
- In office 1872–1873
- Constituency: Allegheny County

Personal details
- Born: February 15, 1839 Canonsburg, Pennsylvania, U.S.
- Died: January 5, 1907 (aged 67) Bellevue, Idaho, U.S.
- Party: Republican (to 1892); Populist (1892–c. 1903); Democratic (from c. 1903)
- Profession: oil refiner merchant
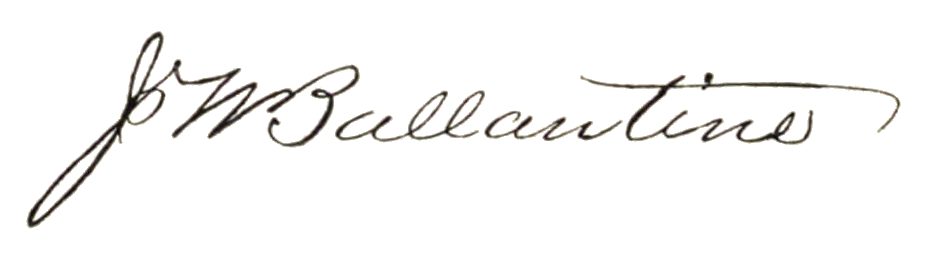
- Signature

James W. Ballantine (February 15, 1839 – January 5, 1907) was an American politician and merchant in Pennsylvania and Idaho.

== Biography ==
Ballantine was born on February 15, 1839, in Canonsburg, Pennsylvania, the son of Nathaniel and Sarah Wallace Ballantine, who had immigrated from Scotland in 1825. He assisted his merchant father in his business until he enlisted in the 9th Pennsylvania Reserve Regiment in April 1861. After the 9th regiment mustered out in May 1864, he enlisted in the 193rd Pennsylvania Infantry Regiment, rising to the rank of lieutenant colonel. He served with the Army of the Potomac for three years, received a gunshot wound to the thigh, and was captured at and held captive for two months following the Second Battle of Bull Run. After the end of the Civil War, he returned to Pennsylvania and engaged in the oil refining business near Pittsburgh until 1883. He was elected to the Pennsylvania House of Representatives as a Republican for the 1872 and 1873 terms, representing Allegheny County.

As the Pennsylvania oil rush petered out and Standard Oil consolidated power in the industry, Ballantine followed the gold rush out of the Idaho Territory's Wood River Valley in 1883. After two years of managing the mining and smelting operations of a company, he turned his attention to mine investment and cattle ranching, becoming one of the most prominent merchants in the region. In 1889, he was selected to represent Alturas County at the Idaho Constitutional Convention, serving as a Republican, and he is a signatory of the state constitution. In 1892, he switched his political allegiance to the Populist Party, and was elected to the Idaho House of Representatives to represent Alturas County. He retired from that body in 1894, having received the Populist nomination for governor. He came in second in that race, losing to incumbent William J. McConnell. In 1896, he was elected to the Idaho Senate to represent newly formed Blaine County. In January 1897, as Populists and Democrats struggled to unite behind a candidate for U.S. Senate, Ballantine was the candidate of the Populists on the twelfth through fifteenth ballots. However, Democrats did not unite behind Ballantine, and ultimately his fellow Populist state senator Henry Heitfeld was elected.

Ballantine did not stand for reelection in 1898, but was again elected as the state senator for Blaine County in 1900 and 1902. He served as president pro tempore of that body for the 1901–1902 session. Ballantine was selected as a delegate to the national Populist convention in 1900 and he received the party's nomination for governor in July of that year, but he withdrew from the election in order to fuse the Populists' ticket with the Democrats' ticket. He was the Democratic candidate for mayor of Bellevue in 1904, losing by one vote, and again in 1905, winning by one vote. He was a delegate to his new party's national convention in 1904, and he became a member of the Democratic state committee in 1906. In 1906, he was the Democratic candidate to be senator from Blaine County, but he lost to Reginald F. Buller.

He was appointed by Governor Frank W. Hunt to the board of directors of the Blackfoot Insane Asylum in 1901 for a term of two years. In 1906, he was a delegate to the National Irrigation Congress, and he was president of the Bellevue State Bank when it opened that December.

Ballantine married Lena McIntyre in 1865, and they had one daughter, Carrie, who died before they came to Idaho. He died of heart disease in Bellevue, Idaho, on January 5, 1907.

== Electoral history ==
=== 1892 ===
1892 Idaho House of Representatives election in Alturas County
Party	Candidate	Votes	%
Populist	George J. Lewis	439	24.6%
Populist	James W. Ballantine	408	22.9%
Democratic	John Condron	269	15.1%
Republican	Presley M. Bruner	266	14.9%
Republican	George E. Ferris	248	13.9%
Democratic	Walter Scott Myers	153	8.6%
Total votes		1,783	100.0%

=== 1894 ===
1894 Idaho gubernatorial election
Party	Candidate	Votes	%
Republican	William J. McConnell (incumbent)	10,208	41.5%
Populist	James W. Ballantine	7,121	29.0%
Democratic	Edward A. Stevenson	7,057	28.7%
Prohibition	Henry C. McFarland	205	0.8%
Total votes		24,591	100.0%

=== 1896 ===
1896 Idaho Senate election in Blaine County
Party	Candidate	Votes	%
Populist-Democratic	James W. Ballantine		%
Silver Republican	Lyttleton Price		%
Total votes			100.0%

=== 1900 ===
1900 Idaho Senate election in Blaine County
Party	Candidate	Votes	%
Populist-Democratic	James W. Ballantine		%
Republican	Presley M. Bruner		%
Total votes			100.0%

=== 1902 ===
1902 Idaho Senate election in Blaine County
Party	Candidate	Votes	%
Populist-Democratic	James W. Ballantine (incumbent)		%
Republican	James A. Lusk		%
Total votes			100.0%

=== 1906 ===
1906 Idaho Senate election in Blaine County
Party	Candidate	Votes	%
Republican	Reginald F. Buller		%
Democratic	James W. Ballantine		%
Total votes			100.0%
