= Orlando B. Batten =

American lawyer & politician (c.1855–1920)

Delegate to the Idaho Constitutional Convention
- In office July 4, 1889 – August 6, 1889
- Constituency: Alturas County

Member of the Montana Territorial House of Representatives
- In office January 8, 1883 – January 12, 1885
- Preceded by: Henry Chambers
- Succeeded by: Clyde Eastman; Martin L. Emigh
- Constituency: Missoula County

Personal details
- Born: c. 1855 Maryland, U.S.
- Died: January 20, 1920 (aged c. 64) Salem, New Jersey, U.S.
- Party: Democratic
- Education: St. John's College; University of Maryland School of Law
- Profession: lawyer and politician
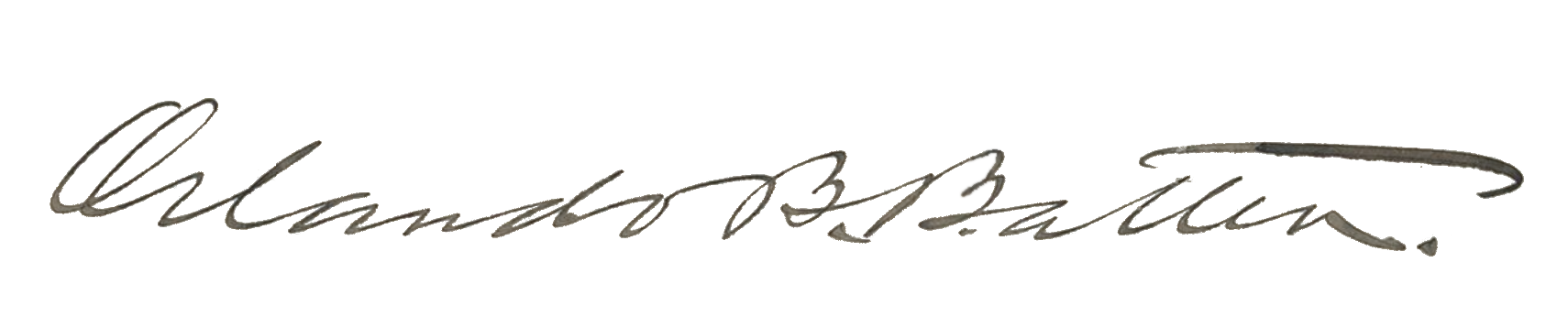
- Signature

Orlando Bennett Batten (c. 1855 – January 20, 1920) was an American lawyer and politician who was a pioneer of the Montana and Idaho territories.

== Biography ==
Batten was born in about 1855 in Maryland, graduated from St. John's College in Annapolis in 1874, and graduated from the University of Maryland School of Law in 1876. In 1879, he sailed to Oregon to teach at the Bishop Scott Academy. In 1880, he was accepted in Grenada, Mississippi, as a candidate for holy orders of the Protestant Episcopal Church, with the plan to attend a three year preparatory course at Sewanee: The University of the South.

However, he soon turned to the practice of law, moving to the Montana Territory in 1881 and being admitted to practice before the Montana Territorial Supreme Court in 1882. Later that year, he was elected as a Democrat to the Montana Territorial House of Representatives to represent Missoula County in the 1883 session. In the legislature, he advocated for education reform, including making education compulsory. Later that year, he moved to Oregon, becoming a close associate of William H. Clagett.

Batten soon followed Clagett to the Idaho Territory, locating in Ketchum in 1885 and quickly receiving an appointment as deputy district attorney for Alturas County. In 1886, he was admitted to practice before the Idaho Territorial Supreme Court and lost the Democratic nomination for county district attorney. The following year, he was reportedly considered for nomination to the Attorney General for the territory by Governor Edward A. Stevenson, after his first nominee was rejected, but instead Richard Z. Johnson was reappointed. In 1888, he again ran for county district attorney, securing the Democratic nomination over Lycurgus Vineyard, but he narrowly lost the general election. The following year, he was appointed by Governor Stevenson as one of the initial regents of the University of Idaho, he represented Alturas County as a delegate to the Idaho Constitutional Convention, and he is a signatory of the resulting document.

In 1907 and 1909, he was appointed as a commissioner of deeds in New York City. On January 20, 1920, he died in Salem, New Jersey, and he was buried in Norfolk, Virginia.

== Electoral history ==
=== 1882 ===
1882 Montana House of Representatives election in Missoula County
| Party | Candidate | Votes | % |
|---|---|---|---|
| Democratic | Orlando B. Batten | 1,570 | 100.0% |
| Total votes | | 1,570 | 100.0% |

=== 1888 ===
1888 district attorney election in Alturas County
| Party | Candidate | Votes | % |
|---|---|---|---|
| Republican | J. L. Waters | 1,393 | 51.1% |
| Democratic | Orlando B. Batten | 1,333 | 48.9% |
| Total votes | | 2,726 | 100.0% |
