= William J. McConnell =

American politician (1839–1925)

William McConnell
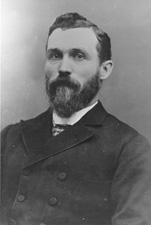

United States Senator from Idaho
- In office December 18, 1890 – March 3, 1891
- Preceded by: (none)
- Succeeded by: Fred Dubois

3rd Governor of Idaho
- In office January 2, 1893 – January 4, 1897
- Lieutenant: F. B. Willis; F. J. Mills
- Preceded by: N. B. Willey
- Succeeded by: Frank Steunenberg

Delegate to the Idaho Constitutional Convention
- In office July 4, 1889 – August 6, 1889
- Constituency: Latah County

Personal details
- Born: William John McConnell; September 18, 1839 Commerce, Michigan
- Died: March 30, 1925 (aged 85) Moscow, Idaho
- Resting place: Moscow Cemetery; Moscow, Idaho
- Party: Republican
- Spouse(s): Louisa Brown McConnell (1846–1930) (m. 186x–1925, his death)
- Children: 2 sons, 3 daughters
- Parent(s): James McConnell (1793–1880); Nancy Coulter McConnell (1802–1859)
- Profession: Agriculture, Mining

William John McConnell (September 18, 1839 – March 30, 1925) was the third governor of Idaho from 1893 until 1897. He had previously represented the new state as one of its first United States Senators; Idaho achieved statehood in July 1890.

== Early years ==
Born in Michigan and educated in its public schools, McConnell headed west as a freight wagon driver and ended up in California. There, he found work where he could get it: miner, store clerk, cowboy, and teacher. In 1862, he moved to Oregon, where he taught school, and then followed the gold rush into the Idaho Territory the following year.

Perhaps based on his earlier experience in California, McConnell spotted opportunity on the way to the gold fields around Idaho City. Rather than joining the throngs of prospectors, he and two other men claimed some good farmland near Horseshoe Bend. He and the others dug the first significant irrigation ditch along the Payette River and began raising vegetables. The following year, McConnell led a pack train loaded with produce over the mountains to Placerville and sold them at "fabulous" prices.

At the time, Idaho Territory was about a year old and law enforcement was scant to non-existent. When he and other settlers along the Payette began to lose horses and mules to thieves, the youthful McConnell took the lead in organizing a Vigilance committee for the region. While it did not end crime in the area, the work of the committee did reduce it and, according to the Illustrated History, "The farmers had no further trouble with horse thieves." McConnell later published a history of the period, which included a lengthy account of the vigilantes' work. He offered no apologies and asked for no forgiveness ... but simply described what he saw as the necessity for what was done. Although, or perhaps because, McConnell was the recognized leader of the vigilantes, in 1865 he was appointed a Deputy U.S. Marshal for Idaho Territory. At the end of his two-year term, he returned to California.

== Pacific Coast interlude ==
In about 1867, McConnell married Louisa Brown and their first child was born in California, where he owned (or worked in) a general store and raised cattle. About 1871, the family moved to Oregon, where they eventually settled in Yamhill County. There, McConnell owned a general store and ran cattle. In 1882, he was elected to the state senate, and was then selected as the senate president.

== Return to Idaho ==
Around 1879, McConnell had begun investing in the growing town of Moscow, Idaho, and in 1884 he moved his family there. The general store he opened with a partner in Moscow was for many years considered the finest in the region. McConnell represented Latah County in the Idaho Constitutional Convention.

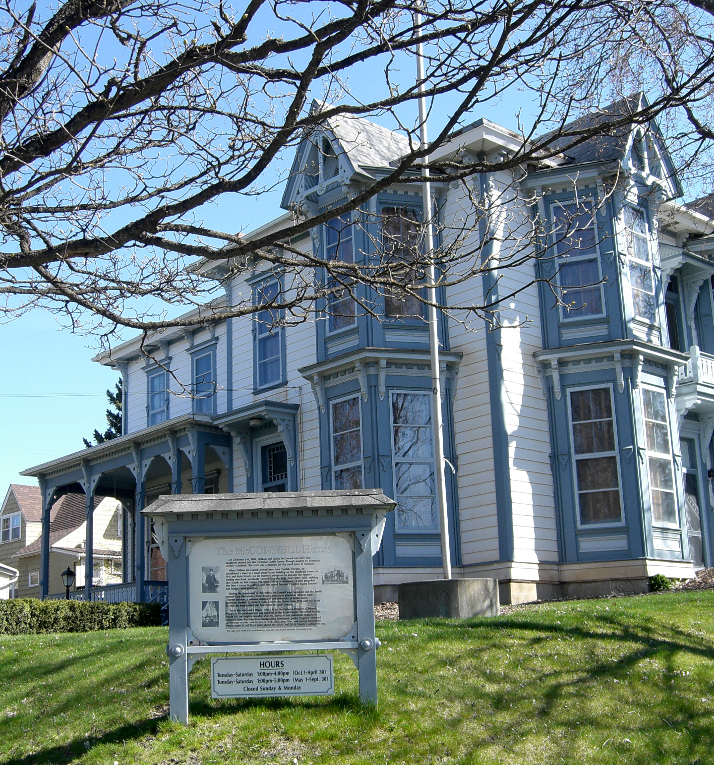
McConnell Mansion (1886) in Moscow is on the National Register; it is open for tours by the Latah County Historical Society.

After Idaho became at state on July 3, 1890, McConnell was one of its first U.S. Senators. He served only a short term, which was meant to get the state "in sync" with a normal election cycle. For a time, the new state actually had three Senators-elect: McConnell, Fred Dubois, and "Judge" William Clagett. The Senate had to vote on which of the two besides McConnell they would seat – they chose Dubois.

McConnell's term ended in March 1891, and he decided to run for governor as the candidate for the Republican Party. In a state-level reflection of political turmoil across the country, he won with only a plurality (40.6%) of the vote: candidates for the Democratic and Populist parties split 58% of the rest. A Prohibition Party candidate polled about 1.3%. When he ran for re-election, he won in a similar manner, polling 41.5% of the votes with the Democrats and Populists splitting most of the remaining votes. After his first gubernatorial election, McConnell ended his involvement with the store in Moscow and moved to Boise. There, in 1895, his daughter Mary (or sometimes Mamie) married attorney William E. Borah (1865–1940), who was elected to six terms in the U.S. Senate (1907–40). Mary lived until 1976, to the advanced age of 105 years.

Along with Willis Sweet, McConnell was at the forefront of the movement to locate the University of Idaho in Moscow. A residence hall built in 1957 was named for him.

== Gubernatorial activities ==
Taking office in 1893 as a minority candidate did not smooth McConnell's task as Idaho's third governor. (The first governor, George L. Shoup, resigned after serving just a few months before being elected for a full term as a U.S. Senator.) Having been so recently granted statehood, Idaho had to work out many details of how the state would be governed. Thus, many problems landed on his desk.

Under McConnell's administrations, Idaho did away with a "test oath" whose effect was to disenfranchise the state's considerable body of Mormon voters. Also, the state was the fourth to grant women the right to vote, in 1896. The state also initiated the infrastructure needed to administer irrigation projects eligible for Carey Act consideration. Several years would pass before a complete and effective system could be put in place, but Idaho eventually became the single greatest success story under the Act.

During his tenure, the state suffered – along with the nation – through the severe depression called the Panic of 1893, when several major railroads and over 500 banks failed. The economic crisis naturally exacerbated the conflict between labor unions and companies, especially in the silver mines in the Coeur d'Alene region of North Idaho. The crisis in Idaho deepened with the repeal of the Sherman Silver Purchase Act – the Federal government was no longer required to purchase a set monthly amount of silver. The resulting crash in prices squeezed the mining companies, leading to layoffs and moves to cut wages. The subsequent unrest, and flare-ups of violence, led McConnell to threaten the use of troops to keep the peace.

== Afterwards ==
McConnell did not run for a third term, perhaps realizing that his mainstream Republican Party was going to lose badly. McConnell was himself a "Free Silver" supporter, but refused to abandon the Party over one divisive issue. As expected, a coalition of Democrats, Populists, and Silver-Republicans swept the 1896 state elections; mainstream Republicans retained only one seat in the legislature.

Fortunately for McConnell, Republican William McKinley handily beat William Jennings Bryan, the Democratic/Populist candidate for president. As a reward for his party loyalty, he received an appointment in the Bureau of Indian Affairs, a position he held until 1901. Later, he served as an Immigration Service Inspector from 1909 until his death in 1925.

McConnell's memorial service in Moscow was held at the auditorium (of the administration building) at the University of Idaho, which included most of the states's dignitaries. He and his wife Louisa (1846–1930) are buried in the Moscow Cemetery.

Party political offices
Preceded by George L. Shoup	Republican nominee for Governor of Idaho; 1892, 1894	Succeeded by David H. Budlong
U.S. Senate
Preceded by (none)	U.S. senator (Class 3) from Idaho; December 18, 1890–March 3, 1891; Served alongside: George L. Shoup	Succeeded by Fred Dubois
Political offices
Preceded by N. B. Willey	Governor of Idaho; January 1893–January 4, 1897	Succeeded by Frank Steunenberg
