= Henry Armstrong (Idaho politician) =

American politician (1841–1904)

Member of the Idaho House of Representatives
- In office December 8, 1890 – March 14, 1891
- Constituency: Logan County

Delegate to the Idaho Constitutional Convention
- In office July 4, 1889 – August 6, 1889
- Constituency: Logan County

Personal details
- Born: September 11, 1841
- Died: August 2, 1904 (aged 62)
- Party: Republican (to c. 1891); Populist Party (from c. 1896)
- Profession: miner
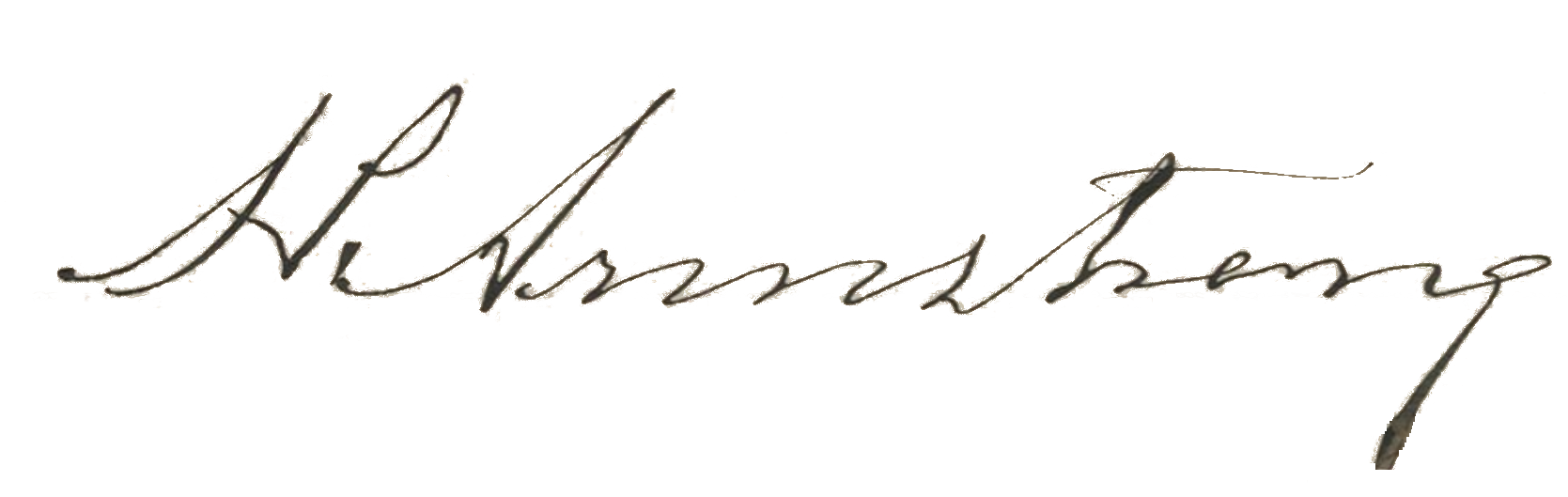
- Signature

Henry Armstrong (September 11, 1841 – August 2, 1904) was an American politician who was a pioneer of Idaho.

Armstrong served in the 2nd Wisconsin Cavalry Regiment from December 1861 to October 1865, reaching the rank of sergeant. He came to the Idaho Territory as a miner, operating a mine in Galena Gulch, in Alturas County, by 1882. He settled initially in Broadford, and later across the river in Bellevue, becoming justice of the peace for Broadford in 1885.

He was selected as a delegate to the territorial Republican convention in 1888. He was elected as a Republican to represent short-lived Logan County, first at the Idaho Constitutional Convention in 1889, then in the first session of the Idaho House of Representatives, which lasted from December 1890 to March 1891.

Armstrong was a member of the Populist Party in the late 19th-century, serving as a delegate at the party's 1896 and 1900 state conventions and losing an election for probate judge of Blaine County in 1898. He ran as an independent for mayor of Bellevue in 1902, losing by 8 votes.
