= Idaho Constitutional Convention =

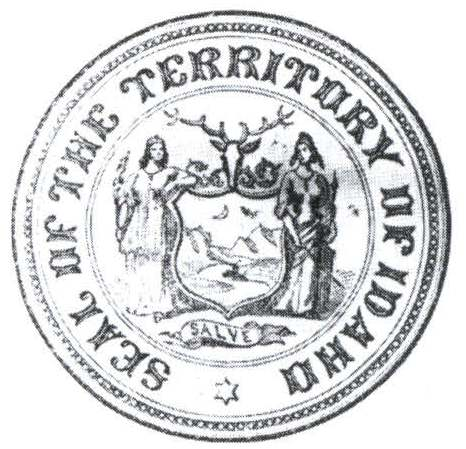
- Seal of the Idaho Territory
- Date: July 4 to August 6, 1889
- Location: Boise, Idaho North America
- Participants: see below
- Outcome: Created Idaho Constitution

The Idaho Constitution Convention drafted the Idaho Constitution in 1889 in preparation for the Idaho Territory to become a U.S. state.

== History ==
=== Background ===
On April 2, 1889, outgoing Territorial Governor Edward A. Stevenson, who had successfully prevented the territory from being absorbed by neighboring territories, issued a proclamation calling for an election to be held on June 3 of that year, to elect 72 delegates to a constitutional convention. On May 11, Stevenson's successor, George L. Shoup, issued a proclamation endorsing the convention, which was scheduled to meet on July 4 in Boise. Idaho, like its fellow statehood-seeking territory, Wyoming, was not the subject of an enabling act, as other statehood-seeking territories usually were before holding a constitutional convention. However, an enabling act for Idaho had been introduced in December 1888 by Oregon Senator John H. Mitchell, and its potential statehood was discussed over the remainder of the 50th Congress.

=== Proceedings ===
The convention met as scheduled on July 4, 1889. John T. Morgan was elected temporary president while the convention organized and settled membership disputes. The following day, William H. Clagett was elected as permanent president of the convention. On July 8, the standing committees of the convention were assigned, and from then until July 17, the committees proceeded to write the bulk of what would eventually be adopted as the state constitution. From July 18 through August 5, the convention engaged in debate over the particulars of the constitution. On the twenty-eighth day of the convention, August 6, 1889, the constitution was approved by delegates by a vote of 51–0, and 64 of the 72 delegates (of whom one was deceased) proceeded to sign the constitution.

=== Approval of constitution ===
On November 5, 1889, Idaho Territory voters approved of the new constitution by a margin of 12,398 to 1,773. North Idaho had the strongest returns for adoption, while central and southeast Idaho had the weakest returns for adoption, with southeast Idaho falling in between. On July 3, 1890, President Benjamin Harrison signed the law admitting Idaho as the 43rd U.S. state.

County	Votes for adoption	Votes against adoption	Approval %
Ada	1,331	443	75%
Alturas	290	51	85%
Bear Lake (Note: County results were not officially returned.)	44	39	53%
Bingham	716	171	81%
Boise	539	80	87%
Cassia	130	92	59%
Custer	498	33	94%
Elmore	795	26	97%
Idaho	199	137	59%
Kootenai	1,032	24	98%
Latah	2,523	117	96%
Lemhi	890	30	97%
Logan	380	71	84%
Nez Perce	112	103	52%
Oneida	278	95	75%
Owyhee	388	37	91%
Shoshone	1,811	51	97%
Washington	442	173	72%
Territory total	12,398	1,773	87%

== List of delegates ==
Delegate	Representing	Residence	Party	Signatory?
George Ainslie	Boise County	Idaho City	D	yes
W. C. B. Allen	Logan County	Shoshone	R	yes
Robert Anderson	Bingham County	Eagle Rock	D	yes
Norman I. Andrews	Lemhi County	Salmon	R	yes
Henry Armstrong	Logan County	Broadford	R	yes
James W. Ballantine	Alturas County	Muldoon	R	yes
Orlando B. Batten	Alturas County	Ketchum	D	yes
Frank W. Beane	Bingham County	Blackfoot	D	yes
James H. Beatty	Alturas County	Hailey	R	yes
A. D. Bevan	Shoshone County	Wardner	D	yes
Henry B. Blake	Latah County	Moscow	D	yes
John W. Brigham	Latah County	Moscow	R	yes
Fred Campbell	Boise County	Placerville	R	yes
Frank P. Cavanah	Elmore County	Rocky Bar	D	yes
A. S. Chaney	Latah County	Kendrick	D	yes
William H. Clagett	Shoshone County	Osburn	R	yes
Charles A. Clark	Ada County	Boise	D	yes
Isaac N. Coston	Ada County	Boise	D	yes
A. J. Crook	Custer County	Clayton	R	no
James I. Crutcher	Owyhee County	Silver City	D	yes
Stephen S. Glidden	Shoshone County	Burke	R	yes
John S. Gray	Ada County	Boise	R	yes
Albert Hagan	Kootenai County	Coeur d'Alene	D	no
William W. Hammell	Shoshone County	Wallace	R	yes
Hiram S. Hampton	Cassia County	Shoshone	R	yes
H. O. Harkness	Bingham County	McCammon	R	yes
Frank Harris	Washington County	Weiser	D	yes
Sol Hasbrouck	Washington County	Weiser	R	yes
Charles M. Hays	Owyhee County	Silver City	R	yes
Wilbur A. Hendryx	Kootenai County	Kootenai County	R	no
Weldon B. Heyburn	Shoshone County	Murray	R	yes
John Hogan	Lemhi County	Salmon	D	yes
J. M. Howe	Nez Perce County	Lewiston	R	yes
Edward S. Jewell	Washington County	Salubria	D	yes
George W. King	Shoshone County	Wallace	D	yes
Harry Kinport	Bingham County	Pocatello	D	yes
J. W. Lamoreaux	Cassia County	Albion	D	yes
John Lemp	Ada County	Boise	R	yes
John Lewis	Oneida County	Malad City	R	yes
W. C. Maxey	Ada County	Caldwell	R	yes
Alexander E. Mayhew	Shoshone County	Murray	D	yes
William J. McConnell	Latah County	Moscow	R	yes
Patrick McMahon	Alturas County	Ketchum	D	no
Henry Melder	Kootenai County	Rathdrum	R	yes
John T. Morgan	Bingham County	Blackfoot	R	yes
A. B. Moss	Ada County	Payette	R	yes
John H. Myer	Boise County	Placerville	D	yes
Thomas F. Nelson	Idaho County	Cottonwood	D	no
Aaron F. Parker	Idaho County	Grangeville	D	yes
P. J. Pefley	Ada County	Boise	D	no
A. J. Pierce	Custer County	Challis	D	yes
A. J. Pinkham	Alturas County	Ketchum	R	yes
James W. Poe	Nez Perce County	Lewiston	D	yes
Samuel J. Pritchard	Owyhee County	Silver City	R	yes
Thomas Pyeatt	Lemhi County	Salmon	R	yes
James W. Reid	Nez Perce County	Lewiston	D	yes
Warren D. Robbins	Latah County	Moscow	R	yes
O. J. Salisbury	Custer County	Bayhorse	R	no
W. H. Savidge	Bingham County	Pocatello	R	yes
James M. Shoup	Custer County	Challis	R	yes
August M. Sinnott	Elmore County	Glenns Ferry	R	yes
Drew W. Standrod	Oneida County	Malad City	D	yes
Frank Steunenberg	Ada County	Caldwell	D	yes
Homer Stull	Elmore County	Mountain Home	D	yes
Willis Sweet	Latah County	Moscow	R	yes
Samuel F. Taylor	Bingham County	Eagle Rock	D	yes
John L. Underwood	Bear Lake County	Montpelier	R	yes
Lycurgus Vineyard	Alturas County	Hailey	D	yes
James S. Whitton	Logan County	Bellevue	R	yes
Edgar Wilson	Ada County	Boise	R	yes
Charles A. Wood (Note: Died June 14, 1889, as a delegate-elect.)	Lemhi County	Salmon	R	no
William W. Woods	Shoshone County	Murray	D	yes

== Committees ==
Over the course of the convention, 37 committees were established. The Republican majority controlled most committees, including those that set the framework for the state government.

Committee	Date established	Majority party	Majority members	Minority members
Credentials	July 4, 1889	56% D	Democrats: Crutcher, Poe, Cavanah, Standrod, Hagan	Republicans: Heyburn, Savidge, Shoup, Allen
Committee to receive the U.S. Senate Committee on Indian Affairs	July 4, 1889	60% R	Republicans: Sweet, Clagett, McConnell	Democrats: Beane, Ainslie
Committee to escort the President to the Chair	July 5, 1889	67% D	Democrats: Cavanah, Batten	Republican: Morgan
Committee on Committees	July 6, 1889	60% R	Republicans: Heyburn, Allen, Hays	Democrats: Standrod, Batten
Rules	July 6, 1889	60% R	Republicans: Shoup, Beatty, Morgan	Democrats: Reid, Mayhew
Committee to wait upon the Chief Justice	July 8, 1889	67% D	Democrats: Ainslie, King	Republican: McConnell
Ways and Means	July 8, 1889	50%–50%	Republicans: Hasbrouck, Wilson, Shoup	Democrats: Crutcher, Harris, Blake
Executive Department	July 8, 1889	57% R	Republicans: Gray, Savidge, Allen, Hampton	Democrats: Ainslie, Coston, Poe
Legislative Department	July 8, 1889	56% R	Republicans: Morgan, Pinkham, Robbins, Lewis, Glidden	Democrats: Blake, Pefley, Pierce, Stull
Judiciary	July 8, 1889	53% R	Republicans: Heyburn, Sweet, Beatty, Wilson, Howe, Hampton, Morgan, Savidge	Democrats: Mayhew, Ainslie, Woods, Reid, Stull (to July 16), Harris, Batten, Hagan (from July 16)
Preamble and Bill of Rights	July 8, 1889	50%–50%	Republicans: Shoup, Morgan, Hammell	Democrats: Standrod, Clark, Steunenberg
Names, Boundaries and Organization of Counties	July 8, 1889	60% D	Democrats: Reid, King, Jewell	Republicans: Crook, Hasbrouck
Seat of Government, Public Institutions, Buildings and Grounds	July 8, 1889	57% D	Democrats: Cavanah, Crutcher, Kinport, McMahon	Republicans: Gray, McConnell, Melder
Education, Schools, School and University Lands	July 8, 1889	56% R	Republicans: Shoup, Pinkham, Harkness, Armstrong, McConnell	Democrats: Batten, Chaney, Hogan, Bevan
Elections and Right of Suffrage	July 8, 1889	57% R	Republicans: Beatty, Salisbury, Heyburn, Hays	Democrats: Ainslie, Mayhew, Beane (to July 18), Hagan (from July 18)
Revenue and Finance	July 8, 1889	56% R	Republicans: Hays, Sweet, Hasbrouck, Crook, Glidden	Democrats: Blake, Hogan, Lamoreaux, Steunenberg
Legislative Apportionment	July 8, 1889	56% R (to July 20); 61% R (from July 20)	Republicans: Shoup, Underwood, Heyburn, Ballantine (to July 10), Pyeatt, Hendryx (to July 16), Whitton, Brigham (to July 31), Hays, Maxey, Pinkham (from July 10), Melder (from July 16), Sinnott (from July 20), Sweet (from July 31)	Democrats: Myer, Kinport, Parker, Stull (to July 16), Poe, Lamoreaux, Standrod, Jewell, Cavanah (from July 16 to July 20)
Militia and Military Affairs	July 8, 1889	57% R	Republicans: Hammell, Pyeatt, Campbell, Pinkham	Democrats: Clark, Myer, Hogan
Public and Private Corporations	July 8, 1889	56% R	Republicans: Ballantine, Andrews, Savidge, Glidden, Pritchard	Democrats: Mayhew, Kinport, Chaney, Bevan
Federal Relations	July 8, 1889	60% R	Republicans: Sweet, Salisbury, Moss	Democrats: Nelson, Anderson
Municipal Corporations	July 8, 1889	56% D	Democrats: Woods, Hagan, Pierce, Pefley, Vineyard	Republicans: Beatty, Harkness, Crook, Wilson
Labor	July 8, 1889	56% R	Republicans: Armstrong, Sinnott, Howe, Heyburn, Robbins	Democrats: King, Lamoreaux, McMahon, Pefley
Schedule	July 8, 1889	56% R (to July 29); 56% D (from July 29)	Republicans: Gray, Sweet, Howe (to July 29), Savidge, Hampton	Democrats: Woods, Beane (to July 18), Blake, Vineyard, King (from July 18), Reid (from July 29)
Manufactures, Agriculture and Irrigation	July 8, 1889	56% D	Democrats: Stull (to July 16), Coston, Jewell, Beane (to July 17), Taylor, Cavanah (from July 16), Anderson (from July 17)	Republicans: Allen, McConnell, Harkness, Moss
Mines and Mining	July 8, 1889	56% D	Democrats: Crutcher, Cavanah, Bevan, King, Standrod	Republicans: Glidden, Ballantine, Salisbury, Hays
Live Stock	July 8, 1889	60% R	Republicans: Harkness, Underwood, Pyeatt	Democrats: Myer, Pierce
Printing and Binding	July 8, 1889	57% R	Republicans: Allen, Hays, Lemp, Sinnott	Democrats: Clark, Parker, Steunenberg
Revision and Enrollment	July 8, 1889	56% R	Republicans: Beatty, Hammell (to July 27), Morgan, Shoup, Howe, Sweet (from July 27)	Democrats: Hagan, Vineyard, Harris, Standrod
Salaries of Public Officers	July 8, 1889	60% D	Democrats: Poe, Coston, Reid	Republicans: Wilson, Hasbrouck
Public Indebtedness and Subsidies	July 8, 1889	60% D	Democrats: Hagan, Batten, Taylor	Republicans: McConnell, Harkness
Committee to escort the ladies of the Woman's Christian Temperance Union	July 9, 1889	100% D	Democrats: Pefley, Mayhew, Ainslie	—
Special Committee on Finance	July 18, 1889	100% R	Republicans: McConnell, Harkness, Lemp	—
Committee to receive the delegation of Members of Congress	July 20, 1889	50%–50%	Republicans: Hays, Clagett	Democrats: Ainslie, Reid
Engrossing	July 26, 1889	67% R	Republicans: Hasbrouck, Sweet	Democrat: Mayhew
Special Committee on Revision of the Minutes and Proceedings of the Convention	July 27, 1889	67% R	Republicans: Wilson, Moss	Democrat: Clark
Select Committee to draft Article VIII, Section 6	July 30, 1889	60% D	Democrats: Ainslie, Reid, Mayhew	Republicans: Hays, Clagett
Address to the People	August 3, 1889	50%–50%	Republicans: Clagett, Pinkham, Hays, McConnell, Armstrong	Democrats: Ainslie, Reid, Taylor, Clark, Cavanah

== See also ==
- Text of the Constitution of the State of Idaho, as approved by the convention in 1889
- Text of the Constitution of the State of Idaho, as amended as of 2017
