= Placerville =

Placerville is the name of several places in the United States:

- Placerville, California
- Placerville, Colorado
- Placerville, Idaho
