= Fred Campbell (Idaho politician) =

American politician

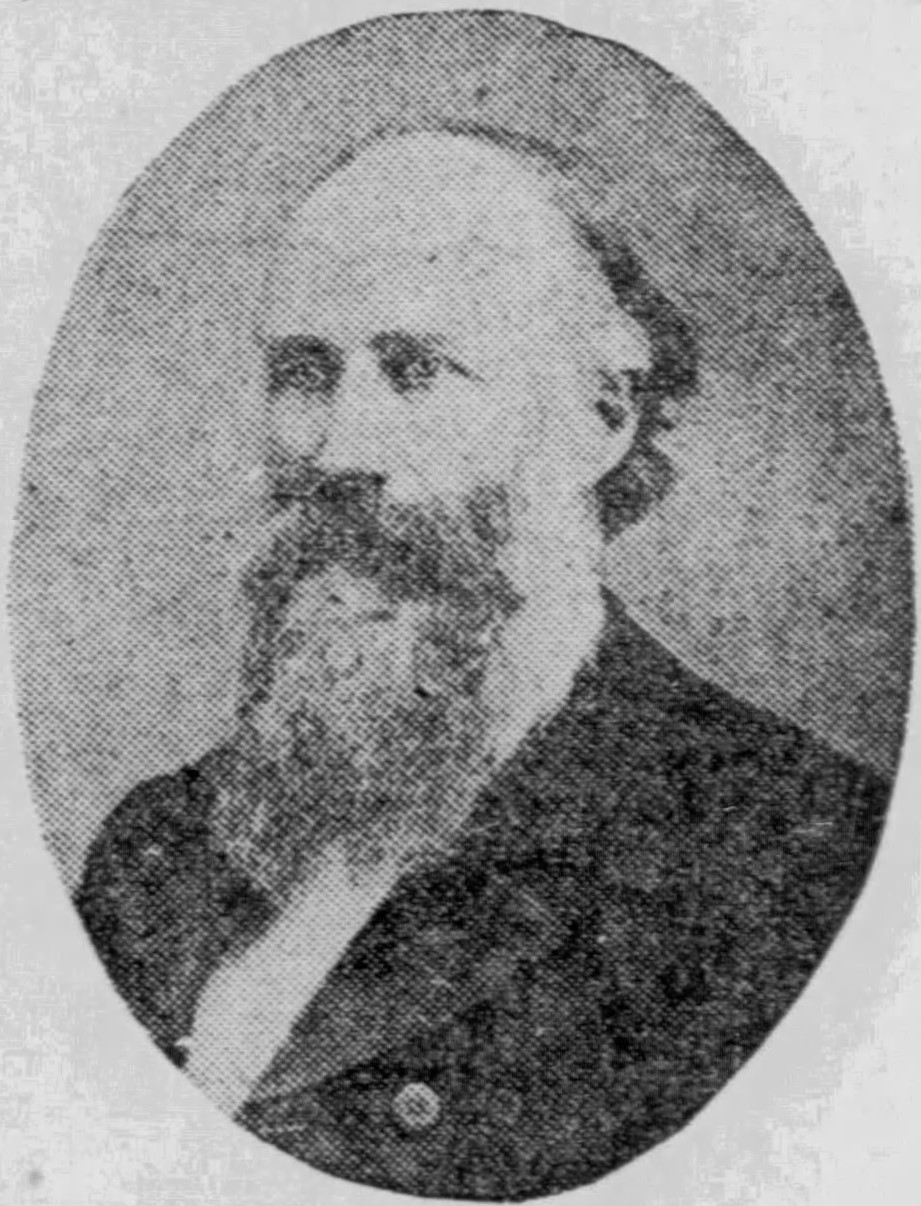

Delegate to the Idaho Constitutional Convention
- In office July 4, 1889 – August 6, 1889
- Constituency: Boise County

Member of the Idaho Territorial Council
- In office 1888–1889
- Constituency: Ada and Boise Counties

Member of the Idaho Territorial House of Representatives
- In office 1872–1875
- In office 1880–1883
- Constituency: Boise County

Personal details
- Born: October 18, 1830 Ravenna, Ohio, U.S.
- Died: January 13, 1913 (aged 82) Boise, Idaho, U.S.
- Party: Republican
- Profession: miner and politician
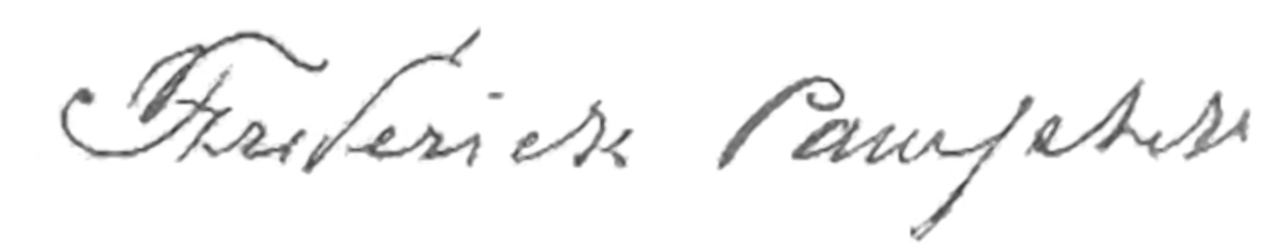
- Signature

Frederick Campbell (October 18, 1830 – January 13, 1913) was an American politician who was a pioneer of the Idaho Territory.

== Biography ==
Campbell was born on October 18, 1830, in Ravenna, Ohio, and made his way West to the Boise Basin of Idaho in 1862. He took up mining in Placerville, where he would live until 1901. He also took part in skirmishes with the local Native American population. He was elected four times as a Republican to represent Boise County in the Idaho Territorial House of Representatives, in 1872, 1874, 1880, and 1882. He lost an election for Boise County Assessor in 1878, and served as assistant clerk for the Idaho Territorial Council in the 1884–1885 session.

Campbell was elected to the territorial council in 1888 to represent Ada and Boise Counties. The following year, he was elected as a delegate to the Idaho Constitutional Convention by Boise County. He then retired from politics, and moved in 1901 to Boise City, where he died on January 13, 1913.
