= Isaac N. Coston =

American politician

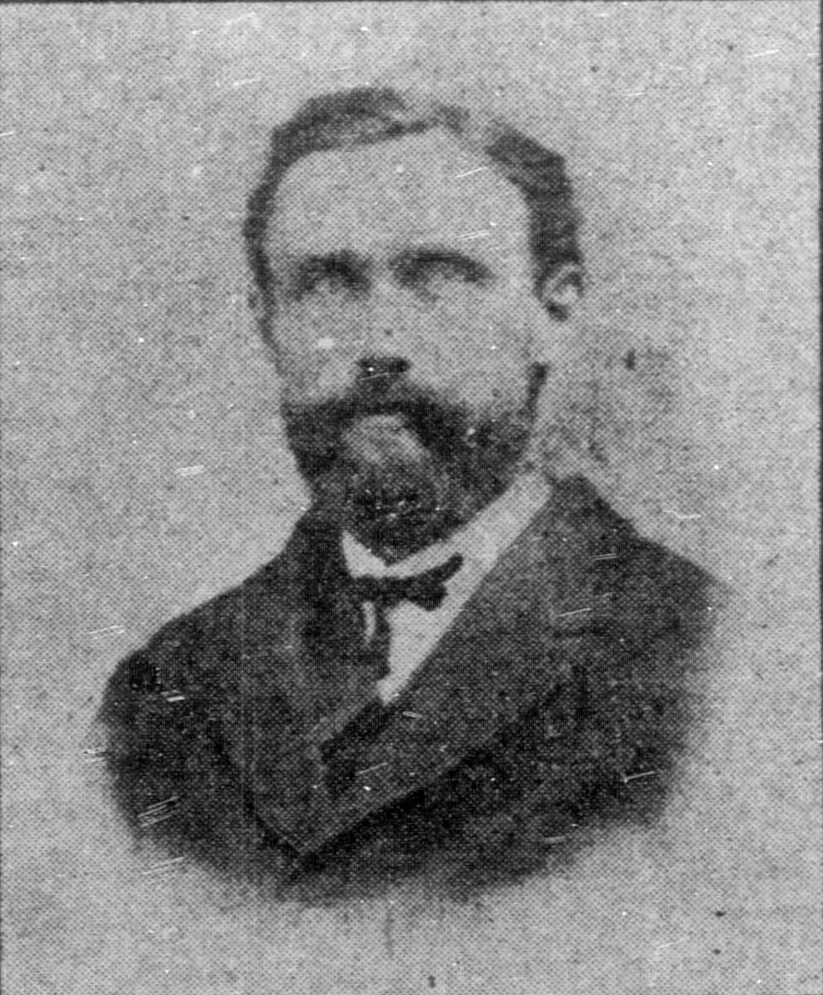

Delegate to the Idaho Constitutional Convention
- In office July 4, 1889 – August 6, 1889
- Constituency: Ada County

Member of the Idaho Territorial House of Representatives
- In office 1882–1883
- Constituency: Ada County

Member of the Idaho Territorial Council
- In office 1870–1873
- Constituency: Ada County

Personal details
- Born: September 22, 1832 Ithaca, New York, U.S.
- Died: January 10, 1910 (aged 77) Boise, Idaho, U.S.
- Party: Democratic
- Spouse(s): Weltha Maynard (m. 1865; died 1867) Mary S. Drake (m. 1872)
- Children: 5
- Profession: farmer, stock raiser, and politician
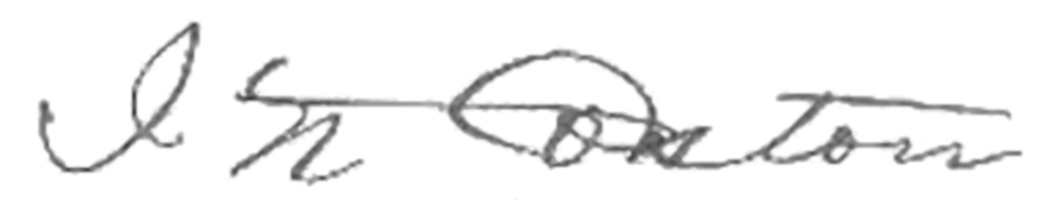
- Signature

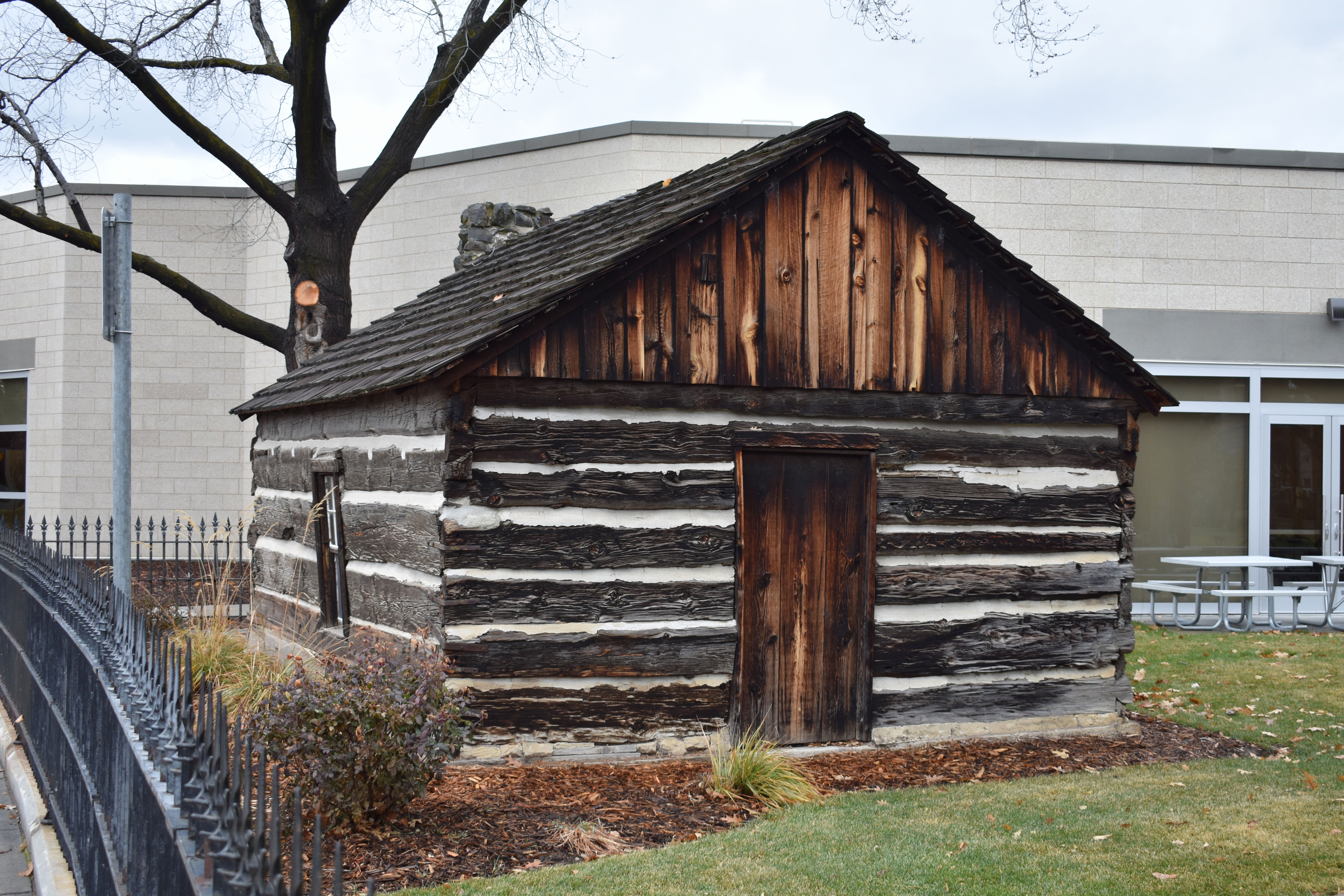
Coston Cabin, in Julia Davis Park, pictured in 2018.

Isaac Newton Coston (September 22, 1832 – January 10, 1910), often known as I. N. Coston, was an American politician who was a pioneer of the Idaho Territory.

== Biography ==
Coston was born on September 22, 1832, in Ithaca, New York. He attended Alfred University for a time before reading law with the firm of Dana, Beers & Howard in Ithaca. While he was admitted to the bar, he did not practice. He traveled extensively, and arrived in Walla Walla, Washington Territory, in 1862. He mined the Idaho Territory's Boise Basin in 1863 before returning East. He married Weltha Maynard in 1865 before returning to the Idaho Territory, moving to a ranch in Ada County, where he began his longterm profession of farming and stock raising. Weltha had one daughter with Coston before she died in 1867. He remarried in 1872, to Mary S. Drake, and they would have four daughters.

He was elected by Ada County to the Idaho Territorial Council in 1870, and re-elected in 1872, when his fellow councilors elected him president of that body. He was later elected to the Idaho Territorial House of Representatives in 1882. He lost a race for territorial council in 1888 before being elected to represent Ada County as a delegate to the Idaho Constitutional Convention. He also spent fourteen years on the board of the Idaho Insane Asylum at Blackfoot.

Coston suffered a debilitating stroke in 1903 and never fully recovered. He died on January 11, 1910, in Boise, Idaho.

Coston Cabin, which Coston built along with his brothers-in-law in the 1860s, remains standing in Julia Davis Park. Coston's papers were gifted to the Idaho Historical Society in 1960.
