= Martin Maginnis =

Union Army officer and politician

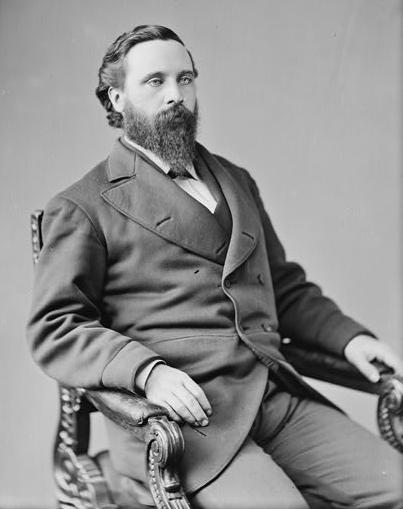

Member of the U.S. House of Representatives from Montana Territory's at-large district
- In office March 4, 1873 – March 3, 1885 (Delegate)
- Preceded by: William H. Clagett
- Succeeded by: Joseph K. Toole

Personal details
- Born: October 27, 1841 Pultneyville, New York, US
- Died: March 27, 1919 (aged 77) Los Angeles, California, US
- Party: Democratic
- Spouse: Louise E. Mann Maginnis
- Profession: Politician, soldier, publisher, editor, miner

Martin Maginnis (October 27, 1841 – March 27, 1919) was a nineteenth-century politician, soldier, publisher, editor and miner from Minnesota and the Montana Territory.

== Origins and early life ==
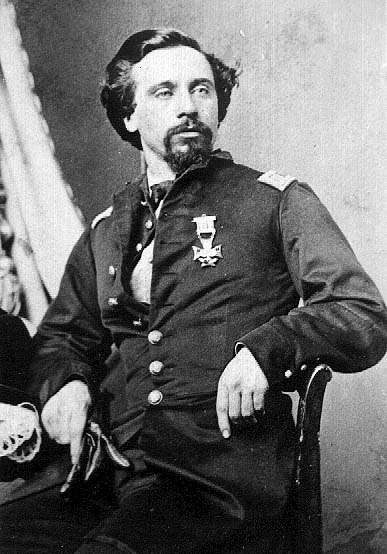
Captain Martin Maginnis

Maginnis was born in 1841 on his family's farm near Pultneyville, Wayne County, New York, to Patrick and Winnifred Devine Maginnis. His parents came from Ireland, his father from County Clare and his mother from Galway, and they met and married in Liverpool, England. After mixed success in business, Patrick and Winifred Maginnis immigrated to the United States in 1838 and settled in Wayne County, New York. Patrick worked as a contractor on the New York Central Railway. In 1851, the Maginnis family moved west to LaSalle, Illinois where Patrick worked on the Illinois Central railroad. The family next moved to Goodhue Township near Red Wing, Minnesota in 1853. Young Maginnis pursued an education in the public schools and in Minnesota he attended Hamline University, but left early to take charge of a Democratic newspaper. Maginnis had come to know William Wallace Phelps, a lawyer and part owner of the Red Wing Sentinel newspaper, and William J. Colvill, the first editor of the Sentinel. Colvill took young Maginnis under his wing, liberally sharing his library with him and enjoying together the abundant hunting and fishing in the area. By early 1861 Maginnis owned the Red Wing Sentinel, while Phelps edited.

== Civil War ==
At the outbreak of the Civil War, he enlisted as a private in the 1st Minnesota Volunteer Infantry Regiment in 1861. Maginnis was promoted to first lieutenant in 1862, to captain in 1863 and to major of the 11th Minnesota Volunteer Infantry Regiment in 1864. He was ordered to join the Army of the Cumberland where he served under the command of General George H. Thomas until being mustered out along with his regiment in 1865.

== Montana Territory ==
After the War, he moved to Helena, Montana with his brothers in 1866 where he engaged in mining and later in publishing and editing the Helena Daily Gazette. Maginnis was elected a Democrat to the United States House of Representatives in 1872, serving from 1873 to 1885 as the territory's non-voting representative. Afterwards, he was unsuccessful in being elected back to the House of Representatives in 1890, was Commissioner of Mineral Land of Montana from 1890 to 1893 and presented his credentials as a Senator-designate in 1900 to fill a vacancy, but was not seated. Maginnis moved to Los Angeles, California for health reasons in 1915 where he died of gangrene of the foot on March 27, 1919. He was interred in Resurrection Cemetery in Helena, Montana.

== Notes ==
U.S. House of Representatives
Preceded by William H. Clagett	Delegate to the U.S. House of Representatives from Montana Territory's at-large congressional district March 4, 1873 – March 3, 1885	Succeeded by Joseph K. Toole
