= Lycurgus Vineyard =

American lawyer and judge

Delegate to the Idaho Constitutional Convention
- In office July 4, 1889 – August 6, 1889
- Constituency: Alturas County

Personal details
- Born: May 17, 1846 Clay County, Missouri, U.S.
- Died: March 14, 1919 (aged 72) Lewiston, Idaho, U.S.
- Political party: Democratic
- Spouse: Sadie Bledsoe (m. 1888; died 1893)
- Children: 2
- Parents: Elisha Vineyard (father); Eliza Harrington (mother)
- Education: William Jewell College
- Profession: lawyer and judge
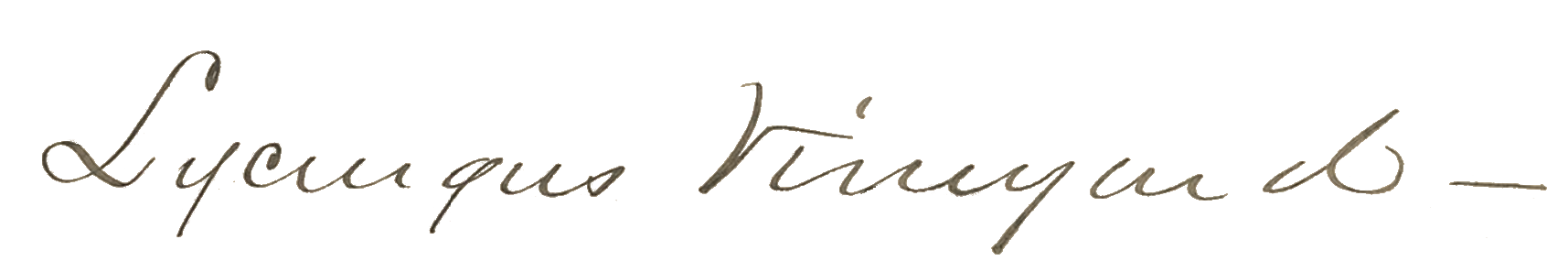
- Signature

Lycurgus Vineyard (May 17, 1846 – March 14, 1919) was an American lawyer and judge who was a pioneer of Oregon and Idaho.

Vineyard was born in Clay County, Missouri, the son of Elisha and Eliza Harrington Vineyard. He lost his mother at an early age and his father travelled to the Oregon coast, leaving him to be raised by an uncle. He attended William Jewell College before fighting for the Confederate States in the Civil War, serving as a private in the 3rd Missouri Infantry Regiment from January 1862 to April 1863. Beginning in 1865, he read law for a year and then travelled to Oregon. He was admitted to the bar in 1868 and took up the practice of law in Dallas, Oregon. He served as justice of the peace in Corvallis, Oregon from 1875 to 1876.

By 1882, he had relocated to Hailey, Idaho Territory, losing Democratic nominations for Alturas County district attorney that year and in 1886. On January 23, 1884, he was admitted to practice law in the Idaho Supreme Court, becoming one of the first hundred attorneys with that privilege. He emerged as a local leader of the territory's Democratic Party, addressing the party's territorial convention in 1884 and securing nomination to represent Alturas County on the Idaho Territorial Council in 1888. While he lost that election, he was selected by the county party's central committee as a delegate for the county to the Idaho Constitutional Convention. While he attempted to resign this position, he served as a delegate and was a signatory of the Idaho Constitution.

Vineyard emerged as one of the most prominent lawyers in the newly established state of Idaho. He relocated to Boise, and in 1892 chaired the Ada County Democratic convention. After moving to Grangeville in 1899, he was selected as a delegate to at least the 1900, 1904, 1906, 1908, 1912, and 1914 state Democratic conventions. He was elected as the justice of the peace for North Grangeville as a Democrat in 1902, and was reelected at least in 1904 and 1912. He became a prominent speaker for the Democratic party around the state.

Vineyard married Sadie Bledsoe in 1888, and they had two children, Richard and Sadie, before she died in 1893. Vineyard died at the age of 73 on March 14, 1919, in Lewiston, Idaho, from paralysis following a series of strokes. (Note: Despite his obituaries stating that he had served in the state legislature, there is no evidence that Vineyard actually served in the Idaho legislature.)
