= Charles Marshall Hays =

Idaho politician

Charles M. Hays
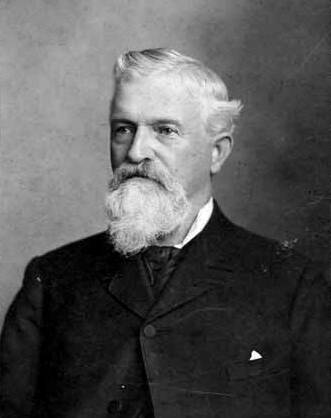

Member of the Idaho Senate
- In office 1899–1901
- Constituency: Ada County

Delegate to the Idaho Constitutional Convention
- In office July 4, 1889 – August 6, 1889
- Constituency: Owyhee County

Personal details
- Born: April 22, 1845 Saline County, Missouri, U.S.
- Died: March 14, 1917 (aged 71) Boise, Idaho, U.S.
- Party: Republican
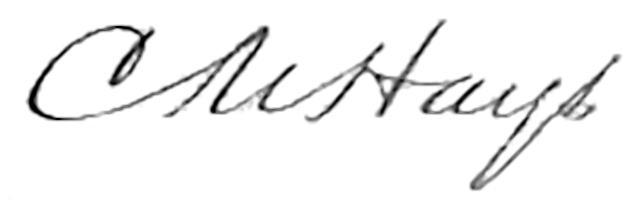
- Signature

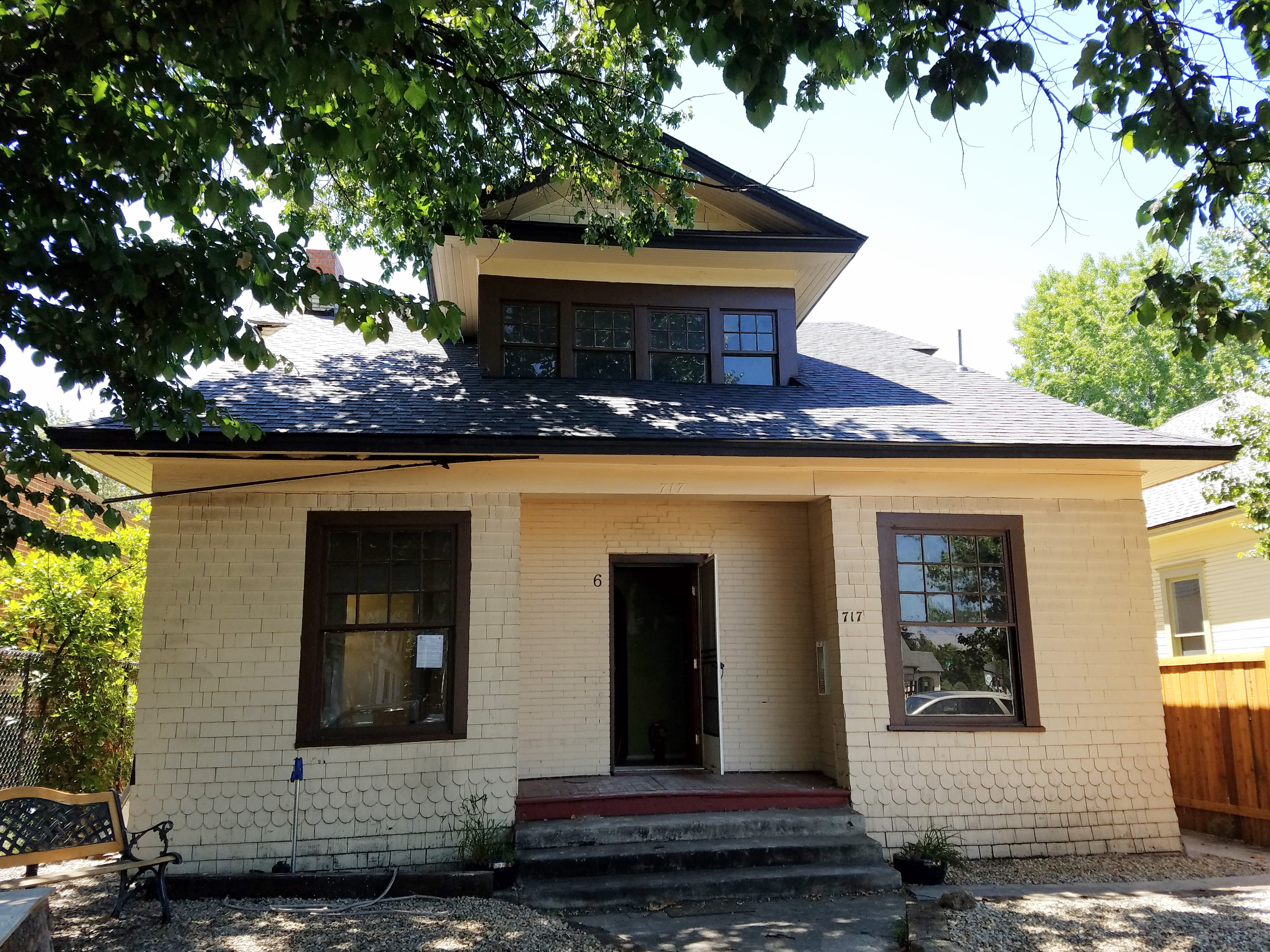
Charles M. Hays House in Boise's Fort Street Historic District

Charles Marshall Hays (April 22, 1845 – March 14, 1917) was a local official, railroad agent, sheriff, and politician in Idaho.

He was born in Saline County, Missouri. He made his way West with his father, Gilmore Hays, himself an Idaho territorial legislator. Charles M. Hays served as a local official in Owyhee County, first as sheriff from 1875 to 1879, and later as prosecuting attorney from 1881 to 1889 and 1907 to 1909. He also served as district attorney for Idaho's third judicial district from 1891 to 1895.

Hays bought the Idaho Avalanche newspaper in Silver City, Idaho. He was a delegate from Owyhee County to the Idaho Constitutional Convention in 1889. He served in the state senate representing Ada County, Idaho.

He married Rebecca L. Dye in 1868 and they had eight children. They had a home in Boise and 640 acres of land elsewhere.
