= James I. Crutcher =

American politician

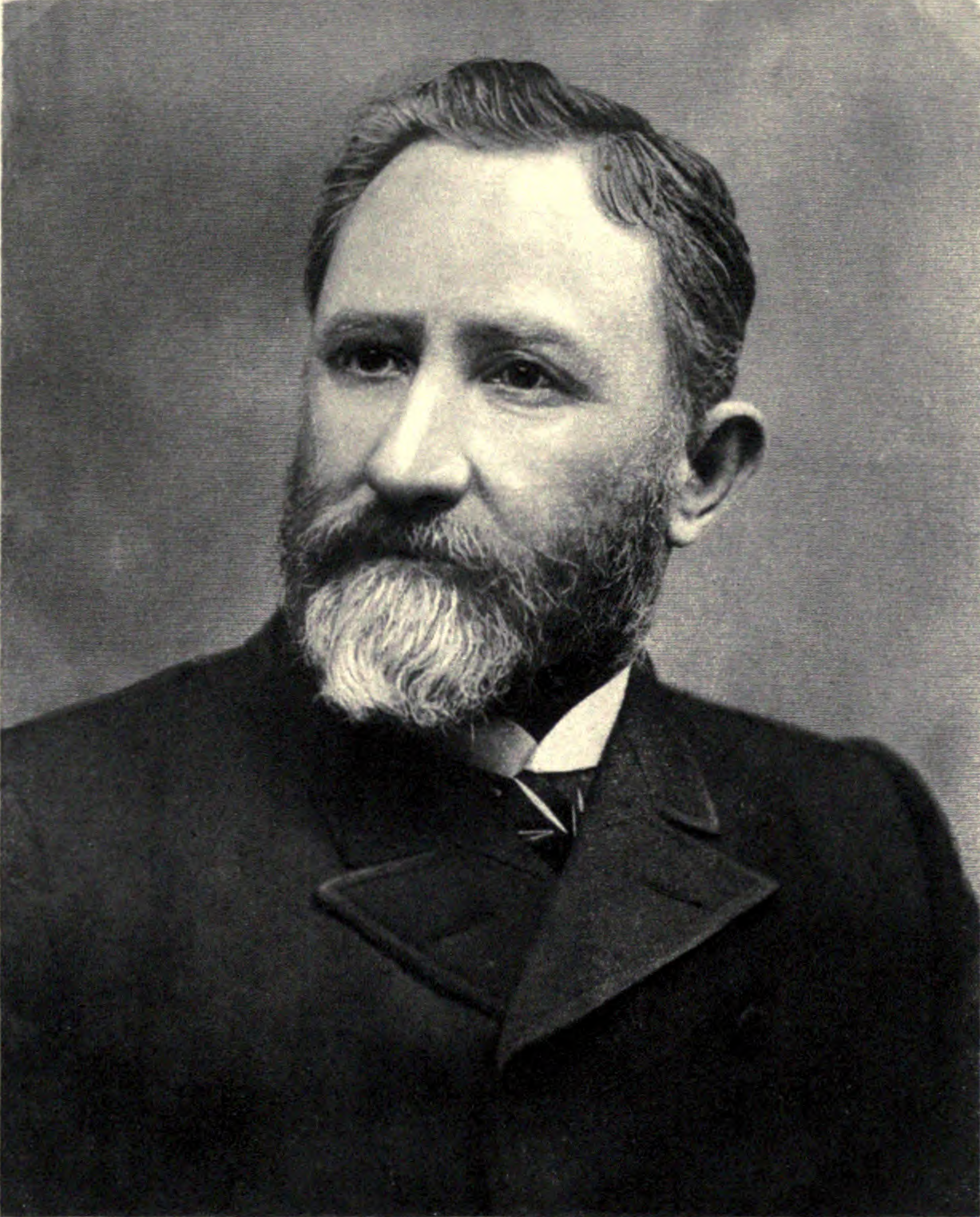

United States Marshal for the District of Idaho
- In office August 8, 1894 – September 10, 1898
- Preceded by: Joseph Pinkham
- Succeeded by: Frank C. Ramsey

Delegate to the Idaho Constitutional Convention
- In office July 4, 1889 – August 6, 1889
- Constituency: Owyhee County

Member of the Idaho Territorial Council
- In office 1886–1887
- Constituency: Owyhee and Washington Counties

Sheriff of Boise County, Idaho Territory
- In office 1865–1869

Personal details
- Born: December 31, 1835 Shelby County, Kentucky, U.S.
- Died: March 2, 1915 (aged 79) Berkeley, California, U.S.
- Party: Democratic
- Spouse: Adelma C. Belknap (m. 1865)
- Children: 4
- Profession: miner and politician
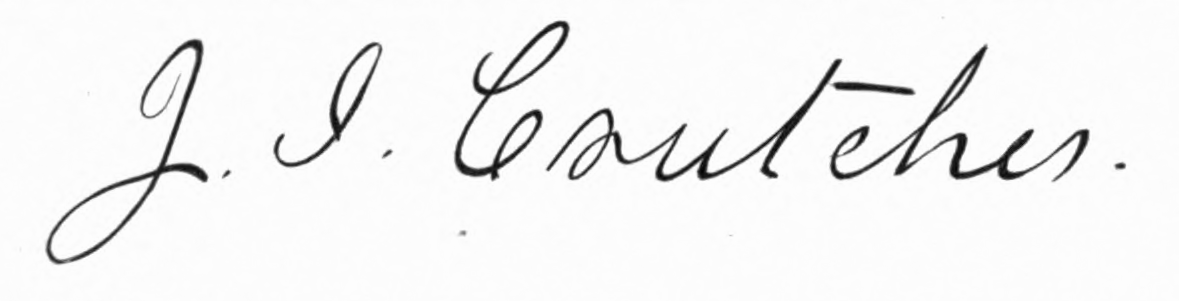
- Signature

James Isaac Crutcher (December 31, 1835 – March 2, 1915) was an American politician and marshal who was a pioneer of the Idaho Territory.

== Biography ==
Crutcher was born on December 31, 1835, in Shelby County, Kentucky, the son of Thomas M. and Mary Ann (née Edwards) Crutcher. Crutcher was educated in Frankfort, Kentucky, before moving West to mine, first to Colorado in 1860, then to Elk City, Idaho Territory in 1862. The following year, he moved to Boise County, and was elected sheriff there in 1865. That same year, Crutcher married Adelma C. Belknap in Idaho City. They would have four children, but all four had died by 1899. After his term, Crutcher resumed mining in Silver City.

In 1886, Crutcher was elected as a Democrat to the Idaho Territorial Council, representing Owyhee and Washington Counties. In 1889, he was elected by Owyhee County as a delegate to the Idaho Constitutional Convention.

On July 30, 1894, President Grover Cleveland nominated Crutcher as United States Marshal for the District of Idaho, and he was confirmed by the Senate on August 8, 1894. He served until his successor, former state controller Frank C. Ramsey, received a recess appointment to the position on September 10, 1898.

Crutcher had a poor financial situation in his last years, which he spent living with his brother in Livingston, and then Berkeley, California. He died in Berkeley on March 2, 1915.
