= James W. Reid (politician) =

American politician

Delegate to the Idaho Constitutional Convention
- In office July 4, 1889 – August 6, 1889
- Constituency: Nez Perce County

Member of the U.S. House of Representatives from North Carolina's 5th district
- In office January 28, 1885 – December 31, 1886
- Preceded by: Alfred M. Scales
- Succeeded by: John M. Brower

Personal details
- Born: James Wesley Reid; June 11, 1849 Wentworth, North Carolina
- Died: January 1, 1902 (aged 52) Lewiston, Idaho
- Party: Democratic
- Spouse: Mary Frances Ellington (m. 1872)
- Children: 2 daughters: Anne Dalton Reid and Lucile Reid.
- Education: Emory and Henry College
- Occupation: lawyer and public official

James Wesley Reid (June 11, 1849 – January 1, 1902) was a U.S. Representative from North Carolina.

Born in Wentworth, North Carolina, to the Rev. Dr. Numa Fletcher Reid and his first wife Ann E. Wright, James W. Reid pursued an academic course. He was graduated from Emory and Henry College, Emory, Virginia, in 1869 and subsequently taught in the same college. He studied law. He was admitted to the bar in 1873 and commenced practice in Wentworth, North Carolina. He served as Treasurer of Rockingham County 1874–1884. He was active in Methodist and Masonic circles. His strength was in his "silver tongued oratory."

Reid was elected as a Democrat to the Forty-eighth Congress to fill the vacancy caused by the resignation of Alfred M. Scales when the latter was elected Governor in 1884. He was reelected to the Forty-ninth Congress and served from January 28, 1885, to December 31, 1886, when he resigned. He had been defeated in an 1886 bitter reelection contest to John Morehead Brower and suffered a humiliating personal financial collapse. His wife and children remaining in Wentworth, Reid moved alone to Lewiston, Idaho, in 1887 and engaged in the practice of law. He served as a member of the Idaho Constitutional Convention in 1889 and was vice president of that body. He served as president of the board of trustees of Lewiston State Normal College from 1893 until his death. He served as delegate to the Democratic National Convention in 1896 and 1900. He died in Lewiston, Idaho, January 1, 1902. He was interred in the Masonic Cemetery.

His Wentworth, North Carolina birthplace, the Wright Tavern/Reid Hotel, was restored in 1970s by the Rockingham County Historical Society.

== Sources ==
- United States Congress. "James W. Reid (id: R000148)". Biographical Directory of the United States Congress.

U.S. House of Representatives
| Preceded by Alfred M. Scales | Member of the U.S. House of Representatives from North Carolina's 6th congressional district 1885–1886 | Succeeded by John M. Brower |
