= George Ainslie (Idaho politician) =

American politician

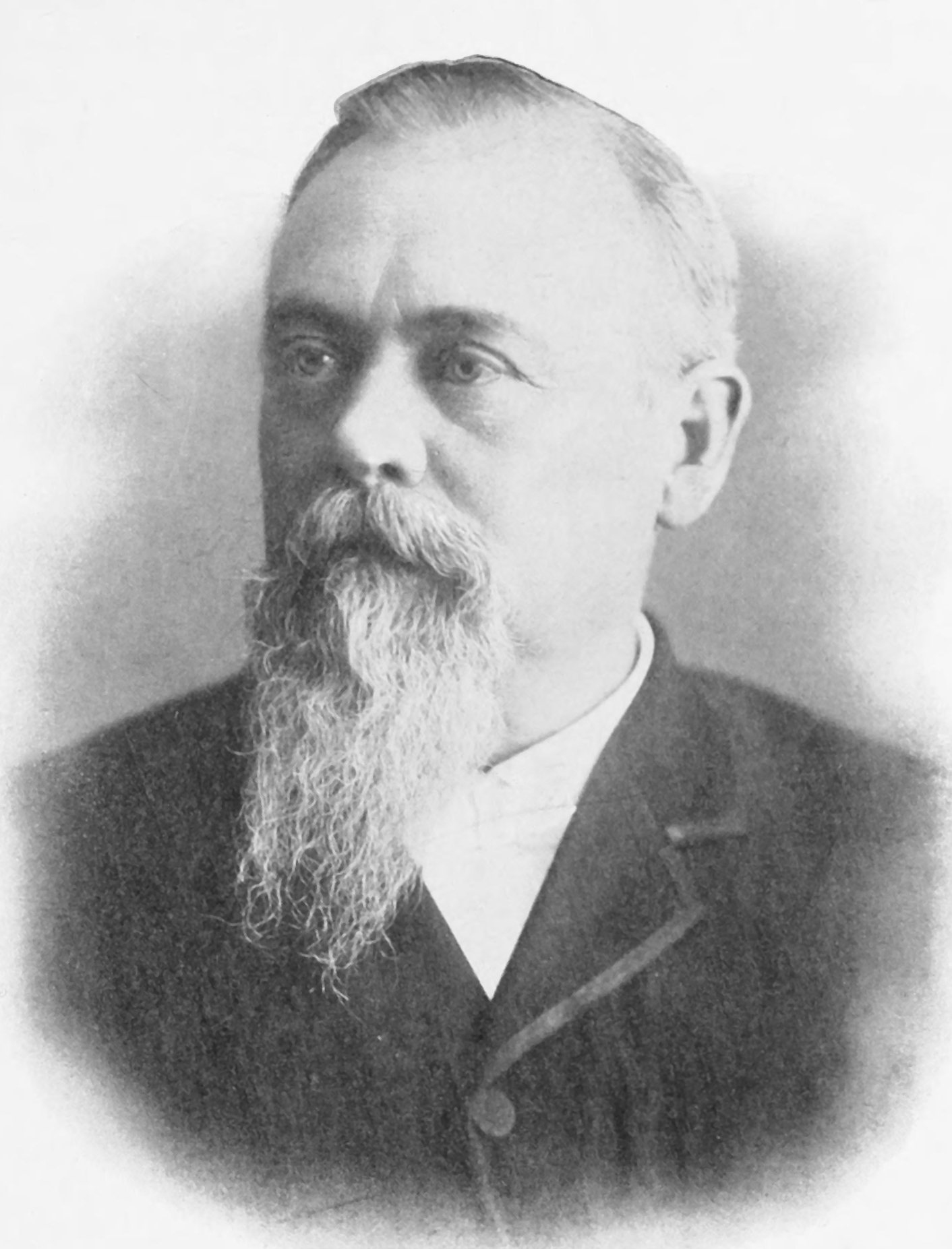

Delegate to the Idaho Constitutional Convention
- In office July 4, 1889 – August 6, 1889
- Constituency: Boise County

Delegate to the U.S. House of Representatives from Idaho Territory
- In office March 4, 1879 – March 3, 1883
- Preceded by: Stephen S. Fenn
- Succeeded by: Theodore F. Singiser

District Attorney for the Second District of Idaho Territory
- In office 1875–1879

Member of the Idaho Territorial Council
- In office 1865–1867
- Constituency: Boise County

Personal details
- Born: October 30, 1838 Boonville, Missouri, U.S.
- Died: May 19, 1913 (aged 74) Oakland, California, U.S.
- Party: Democratic
- Spouse: Sara "Sallie" Owens (m. 1866)
- Children: 2
- Parents: John Ainslie (father); Mary S. Borron (mother)
- Relatives: John F. Nugent (son-in-law)
- Profession: Attorney
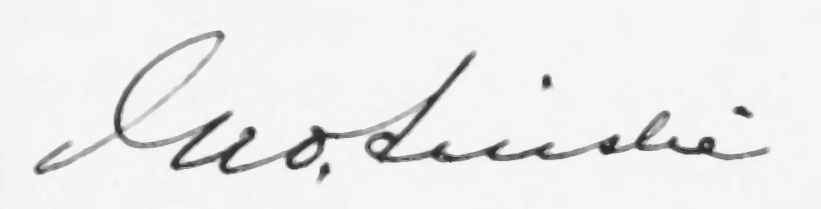
- Signature

George Ainslie (October 30, 1838 – May 19, 1913) was a lawyer, mining investor, and Congressional delegate from Idaho Territory.

== Early life and career ==
George Ainslie was born in Boonville, Cooper County, Missouri. Ainslie's grandfather and father had served in the Scottish regiments of the British Army. Also, his uncle, Colonel William Ainslie, served with the 93rd Regiment of Foot (the "Sutherland Highlanders"). The exploits of "The Sutherlands" during the Crimean War gave rise to the phrase, "The Thin Red Line", later applied to British Army infantry in general.

Ainslie's parents, John and Mary, immigrated and moved to Missouri around two years before he was born. His father became a wealthy landowner, and also operated a salt works. The family went back to Scotland for a time while George was an infant, but returned in 1844. His father drowned in the Missouri River in June of that year.

Ainslie attended courses at what is now St. Louis University in 1855, and declined an appointment at West Point the following year. He read law under experienced lawyers and a judge in St. Louis, and was admitted to the Missouri bar in 1860. After a few months practicing law in Missouri, he moved to the Pike's Peak area in Colorado Territory and opened a law office there.

== Relocation to Idaho ==
Two years later, gold discoveries in Idaho attracted Ainslie's attention. He moved to Elk City, Idaho, during the summer of 1862 and mined in that area until the winter season closed the back country. He spent the winter teaching school in Clackamas County, Oregon, before returning to Idaho in the spring, practicing law in the Boise Basin. He owned an interest in the extremely successful General Custer Mine near Custer.

In Lewiston, Idaho he was approached with a request for his professional services. Here, accounts vary on the timeline of events. Ainslie's biography in the Illustrated History of the State of Idaho states that three men approached him to defend them in a "citizens' court" against a robbery charge. More likely, however, a representative of the men approached him, because the accused robbers were then in jail. In fact, from the timing, it is possible that the trial may have already taken place, with a guilty verdict. This particular robbery had followed a series of robberies and robbery-murders in the region, and public indignation had led to a swift decision.

So Ainslie's services were needed, whether for a trial, or for an immediate appeal, but when he went to consult with his new clients the next morning, he found them dead, hanging from the rafters of a shed behind the temporary jail. One account says that Ainslie realized "the importance of demurrer and the irrelevancy of an appeal" and "retired in good order."

Ainslie married Sara "Sallie" Owens in 1866 in Ada County. The Ainslies were strong Episcopalians, and they had two daughters. From 1869 to 1873, Ainslie edited the Idaho World newspaper in Idaho City.

== Political career ==
In 1865, two years after his move to Idaho City, voters elected Ainslie to the Territorial Council (roughly equivalent to a state senate). Despite his youth, members then elected him as Council President. (Although his biography for the U. S. Congress says he was a member of the "Territorial Legislature," Idaho records confirm his Council position.) After his terms in the Council, Ainslie returned to private law practice, but remained very active in Democratic Party activities. (In keeping with the times, the Idaho World was then billed as "the only Democratic newspaper in the Territory.")

In 1875, he began the first of two two-year terms as District Attorney for the Second District of Idaho Territory. Then, in 1878, he was elected as Idaho Territorial Delegate to the U. S. Congress. (Delegates can vote in committee, but not on the legislative floor.) The Republican editor of the Idaho Tri-Weekly Statesman, in Boise City, opined that "though differing with Mr. Ainslie in politics, we freely accord to him the merit which he deserves."

Ainslie served two terms as Delegate before losing a re-election bid in 1882. He remained a power in state-level Democratic Party politics for many years, and in 1889, he was elected to represent Boise County in the Idaho Constitutional Convention.

== Later life and career ==
After its heyday, Idaho City steadily declined in population. Ainslie moved his family to Boise in 1890, after purchasing an estate across the street from the U. S. Assay Office. He then invested heavily in various enterprises in Boise. That included the Boise Artesian Hot & Cold Water Company and the Boise Rapid Transit Company, which brought electric streetcars to Boise.

Ainslie never lost his interest in mining. For nine years after about 1888, he owned stock in a company that had extensive placer mining claims stretching along Mores Creek from two miles above Idaho City to about four miles below the town. In the early 1890s, those claims became involved in protracted litigation. However, Ainslie and his co-owners eventually won their cases and, in 1897, sold out to a firm that built the first large gold dredge along Mores Creek.

The Ainslies' two daughters, Lucy and Adelma, continued the family tradition of service. Lucy married a prominent San Francisco physician. Adelma married John F. Nugent, later a U. S. Senator from Idaho. A grandson, George Ainslie Nugent, served in the armed forces during World War I. Around 1906, poor health led Ainslie to seek more extensive medical treatment in California. By about 1908, he had moved to Oakland, California. He died there five years later.

== Other sources ==
- United States Congress. "George Ainslie (id: A000066)". Biographical Directory of the United States Congress.

U.S. House of Representatives
Preceded by Stephen S. Fenn	Delegate to the U.S. House of Representatives from Idaho; 1879-1883	Succeeded by Theodore F. Singiser
