= John T. Morgan (judge) =

American judge (c. 1830–1910)

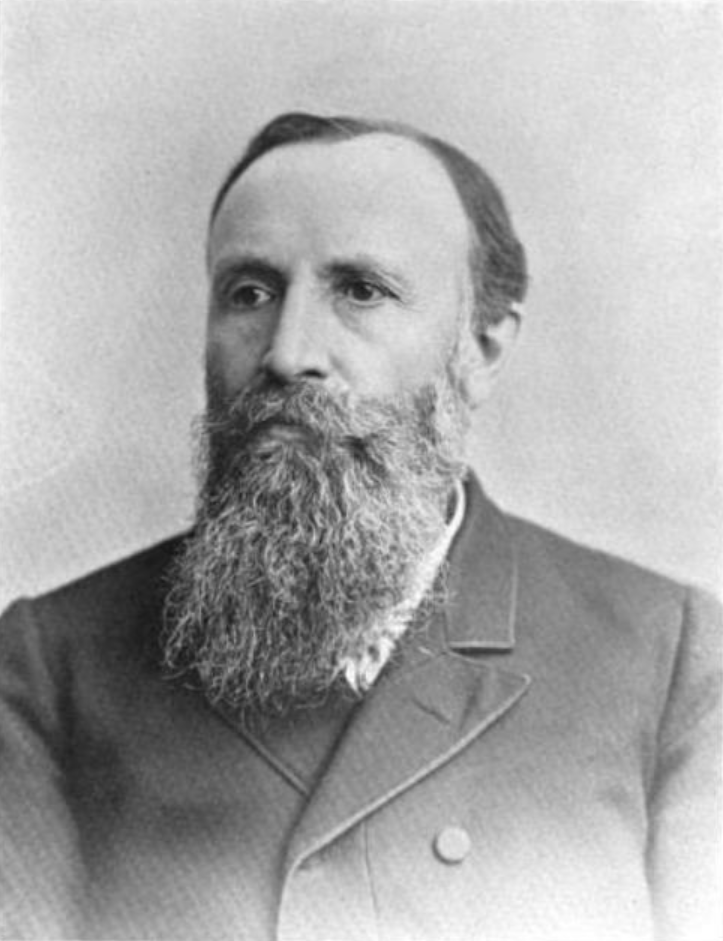

Chief Justice of the Idaho Supreme Court
- In office 1895–1896
- Preceded by: Joseph W. Huston
- Succeeded by: Ralph P. Quarles

Justice of the Idaho Supreme Court
- In office October 1890 – 1896
- Preceded by: seat created
- Succeeded by: Ralph P. Quarles

Delegate to the Idaho Constitutional Convention
- In office July 4, 1889 – August 6, 1889
- Constituency: Boise County

Chief Justice of the Idaho Territorial Supreme Court
- In office June 10, 1879 – August 1885
- Appointed by: Rutherford B. Hayes; Chester A. Arthur
- Preceded by: William George Thompson
- Succeeded by: James B. Hays

Personal details
- Born: November 25, 1831 Hamburg, New York, U.S.
- Died: September 14, 1910 (aged 78) Boise, Idaho, U.S.
- Party: Republican
- Spouse: Maria Horroun (m. 1858)
- Children: 4
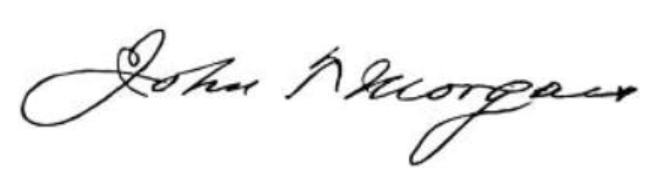
- Signature

John Titus Morgan (November 25, 1831 – September 14, 1910) was an American jurist and politician who served as Chief Justice of the Idaho Territorial Supreme Court from 1879 to 1885 and as Justice of the Idaho Supreme Court from 1890 to 1896.

== Early life, education, and military service ==
Born on November 25, 1831, in Hamburg, Erie County, New York, Morgan was the third son of James Clark Morgan, a farmer who served as justice of the peace for many years. Morgan accompanied his parents to Illinois in 1843, then a largely undeveloped state. He was raised on a farm, attended the public schools of Monmouth, Illinois, and afterward engaged in teaching school in order to continue his own education. In 1852 he entered Lombard University in Galesburg, Illinois, graduating in 1855. He read law in the office of General Eleazer A. Paine, afterward a prominent brigadier general in the Union Army, and remained in that office for three years. He then entered the law department of Albany University, New York, and later continued his studies in the State Law School then located in Poughkeepsie, New York, where he was graduated in 1856, with the degree of Bachelor of Law.

In 1856 he entered the practice of law in Monmouth, Illinois, and "soon secured a large and distinctively representative clientele". On August 11, 1862, he enlisted to fight in the American Civil War with Company F, 83rd Illinois Infantry Regiment. Governor Richard Yates commissioned the raising of the company, and Morgan was elected its captain, in which capacity he served until the close of the war, when he received an honorable discharge on June 26, 1865. While in the service he was for two years provost marshal, stationed at Clarksville, Tennessee, where he had charge of all the abandoned and contraband goods, houses and lands of all persons who had joined the rebel army in that vicinity.

== Political and judicial service ==
Returning to Illinois, Morgan resumed the practice of law in Monmouth. In 1867 he was appointed registrar in bankruptcy, filling the office until 1879. During this period, he became active in politics. In 1870 he was elected to the Illinois House of Representatives, in which he served for two years. In 1874 he was elected to the Illinois State Senate, serving until 1878. Morgan was a Republican.

Morgan was nominated by President Rutherford B. Hayes as Chief Justice of the Idaho Territorial Supreme Court on May 19, 1879, and was confirmed by the senate on June 10, 1879. Morgan's four-year term expired on June 10, 1883, but as is typical for Article I judges, he continued serving, and he was renominated by President Chester A. Arthur on July 3, 1884, and was confirmed by the senate two days later. In July 1885, President Grover Cleveland gave a recess appointment to James B. Hays to replace Morgan as chief justice, and Hays arrived in the Idaho Territory in August 1885 to assume his duties.

Morgan resumed the practice of law in Boise, Idaho, and developed a large clientele throughout the eastern part of the state. He supported Idaho's admission to the Union, and when it became necessary to frame a state constitution he was elected as a member of the Idaho Constitutional Convention, and chaired the committee on the legislative department. In October 1890, he was elected as one of the justices of the Supreme Court of Idaho, serving until March 4, 1897, when he again resumed his law practice. In 1902, Morgan published a booklet advising prospectors of where mining claims could be found in one region of Idaho.

== Personal life and death ==
In November, 1858, Morgan married Maria Horroun of Pennsylvania, with whom he had four children.

Morgan died in his home in Boise, following a paralytic stroke, and was memorialized in the reports of the Idaho Supreme Court the following year.

Political offices
Preceded by court established	Justice of the Idaho Supreme Court; 1890–1896	Succeeded by Ralph P. Quarles
