= John W. Brigham =

American politician

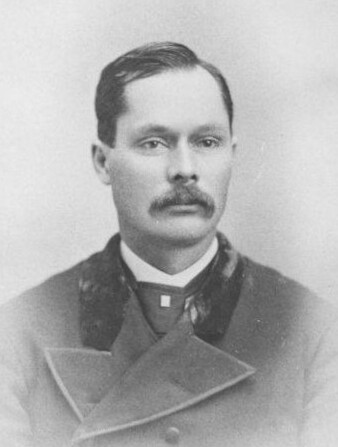

Member of the Idaho Senate
- In office 1890–1893
- In office 1899–1901
- In office 1903–1904
- Constituency: Latah County

Delegate to the Idaho Constitutional Convention
- In office July 4, 1889 – August 6, 1889
- Constituency: Latah County

Member of the Idaho Territorial Council
- In office 1888–1889
- Constituency: Latah and Nez Perce Counties

Personal details
- Born: March 22, 1857 Placer County, California, U.S.
- Died: February 24, 1940 (aged 82) Genesee, Idaho, U.S.
- Party: Republican
- Spouse: Nellie Wilson (m. 1892)
- Children: 7
- Profession: farmer and politician
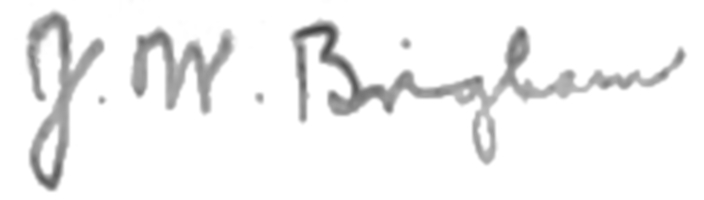
- Signature

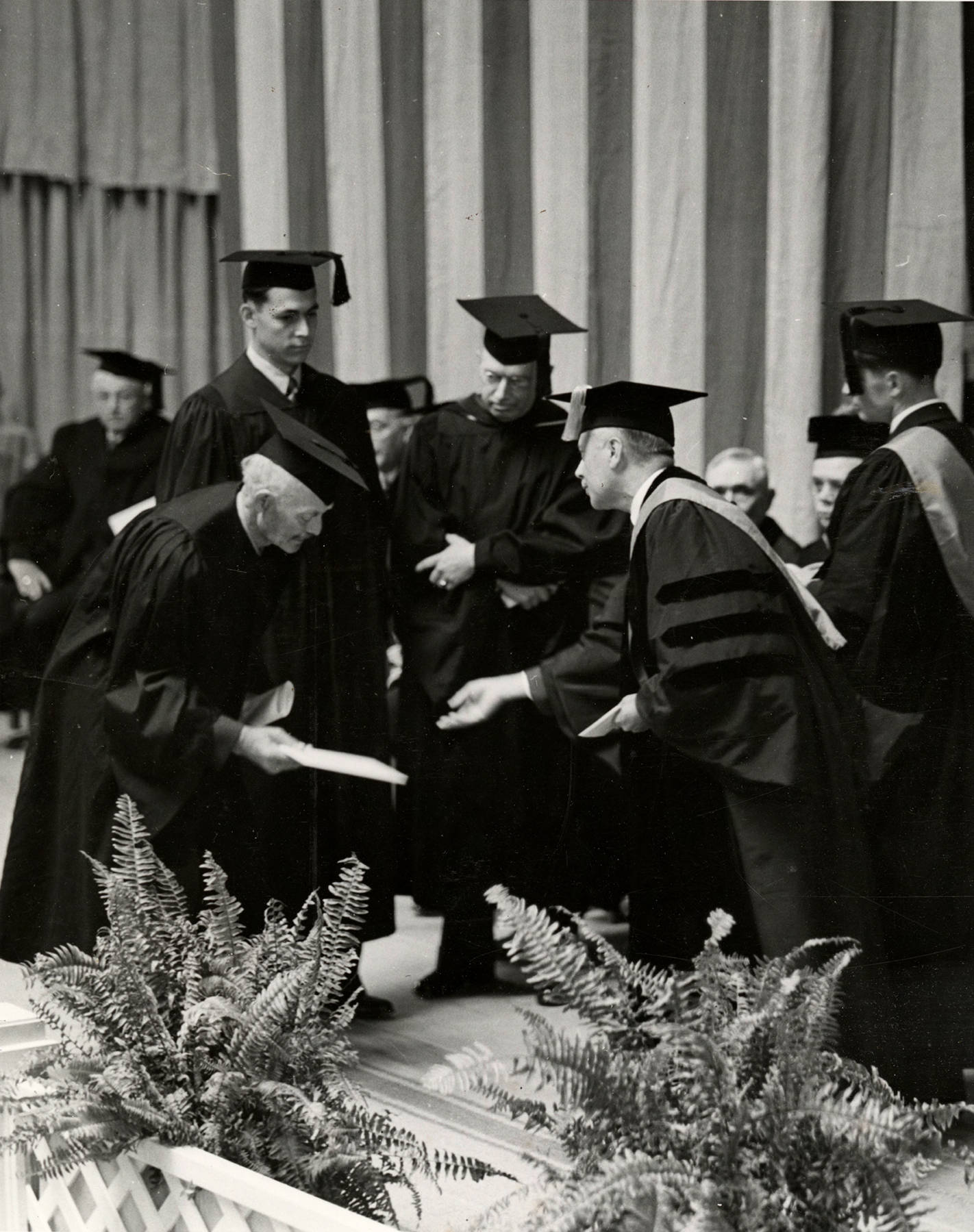
Brigham receiving his honorary degree at the University of Idaho's 50th anniversary celebration.

John Warren Brigham (March 22, 1857 – February 24, 1940) was an American homesteader and politician who was active in Idaho around its statehood and was a legislative founder of the University of Idaho.

== Biography ==
Brigham was born on March 22, 1857, in Placer County, California, the son of Curtis and Esther (née Metcalf) Brigham. In 1878 he moved from the San Joaquin Valley in California, where his father was a farmer and apiarist, to what would become Latah County, Idaho. He secured a homestead claim 7.5 miles northeast of what would become Genesee, Idaho, and ranched there for the remainder of his life. He married Nellie Wilson, a native of Nebraska, in 1893, and they would have seven children.

Brigham was a member of the final Idaho Territorial Council in 1889 and 1890, the first and only councilor elected from newly formed Latah County, along with Nez Perce County, which it had been split from. During his term, he shepherded the bill, drafted by attorney Willis Sweet, that established the University of Idaho in Moscow, through both houses of the legislature. He did so in the territorial council by preying on fears that the Panhandle would secede to form part of the proposed State of Lincoln, and insisted that the university, rather than a penitentiary, should be used as an enticement. He did so in the house of representatives by concealing his tie-breaking vote on the division of Alturas County, and insisting that the act establishing the university be passed. Brigham was honored at the university's 50th anniversary celebration in 1939, receiving an honorary bachelor of arts.

He went on to represent Latah County at the Idaho Constitutional Convention in 1889, and in the state senate from 1890 to 1893, 1899 to 1901, and 1903 to 1904. Brigham died on February 24, 1940, at his home near Genesee. He was one of the three last surviving signatories of the Idaho Constitution.
