= Willis Sweet =

American politician

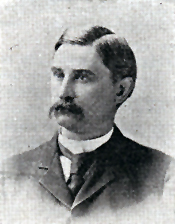

Member of the U.S. House of Representatives from Idaho's at-large district
- In office October 1, 1890 – March 3, 1895
- Preceded by: Fred Dubois (as territorial delegate)
- Succeeded by: Edgar Wilson

Associate Justice of the Idaho Territorial Supreme Court
- In office November 19, 1889 – October 1890
- Appointed by: Benjamin Harrison
- Preceded by: John Lee Logan
- Succeeded by: position abolished

United States Attorney for the Territory of Idaho
- In office April 24, 1889 – November 19, 1889
- Appointed by: Benjamin Harrison
- Preceded by: James H. Hawley
- Succeeded by: Fremont Wood

Delegate to the Idaho Constitutional Convention
- In office July 4, 1889 – August 6, 1889
- Constituency: Latah County

Personal details
- Born: January 1, 1856 Alburgh, Vermont, U.S.
- Died: July 9, 1925 (aged 69) San Juan, Puerto Rico
- Resting place: Puerto Rico
- Party: Republican
- Profession: Attorney
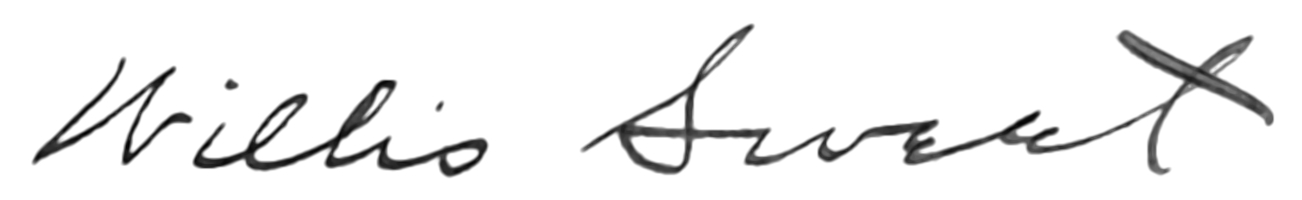
- Signature

Willis Sweet (January 1, 1856 – July 9, 1925) was the first United States Representative elected from Idaho following statehood in 1890. Sweet served as a Republican in the House from 1890 to 1895, representing the state at-large. He vigorously demanded "Free Silver" or the unrestricted coinage of silver into legal tender, in order to pour money into the large silver mining industry in the Mountain West, but he was defeated by supporters of the gold standard.

== Early years ==
Born in Alburgh, Vermont on New Year's Day 1856, Sweet attended public schools and the University of Nebraska in Lincoln, and was a member of the Phi Delta Theta fraternity. He learned the printer's trade in Lincoln and relocated west to Moscow in the Idaho Territory in 1881. Sweet was the first editor of the Moscow Mirror in 1882, studied law and became an attorney, judge, and supreme court justice in the territory.

== Career ==
In the late 1880s, he drafted the legislation that brought the University of Idaho to Moscow, submitting it to territorial councilor John W. Brigham, who saw it enacted. Sweet was the first president of the university's board of regents.

On April 24, 1889, President Benjamin Harrison gave Sweet a recess appointment as United States Attorney for the Territory of Idaho. Sweet served as a delegate to the Idaho Constitutional Convention for Latah County in July and August 1889. On November 19, 1889, Harrison again gave Sweet a recess appointment, elevating him to associate justice of the Idaho Territorial Supreme Court. His nomination was received by the senate on December 16, 1889, and he was confirmed on January 27, 1890. Following Idaho's statehood, per the Idaho Constitution, he remained in office until the state's supreme court justices were elected in October 1890.

While in Congress from 1890 to 1895, Sweet was a leading advocate of the free and unlimited coinage of silver, which would pour large sums of money into Idaho. He closely followed Charles Parnell, the Irish agitator in the British Parliament, who managed to force consideration of his proposals by blocking the legislative process there. Sweet tried to block everything until he got his Free Silver, but he was blocked by Speaker Thomas Reed. When William McKinley was nominated for president in 1896 on a gold standard platform, Sweet supported silver advocate William Jennings Bryan, who was running on the Democratic, Populist, and Silver Republican party labels.

He was a candidate for the U.S. Senate in 1896, but was defeated in the Idaho Legislature by Populist Henry Heitfeld. He was an attorney in northern Idaho in Coeur d'Alene until his appointment as the attorney general of Puerto Rico in 1903. Sweet served until 1905 and then worked as a newspaper editor in San Juan from 1913 until his death in 1925.

== Honors ==
A residence hall at the University of Idaho is named for Sweet. Opened in 1936, the building is now Carol Ryrie Brink Hall, a faculty office building. The Willis Sweet residence hall was relocated to the new Theophilus Tower in 1969, and later to the former McConnell Hall, on the northeast corner of Sixth and Rayburn streets.

U.S. House of Representatives
Preceded by Fred Dubois (territorial delegate)	Member of the U.S. House of Representatives from Idaho's at-large congressional district 1890 – 1895	Succeeded by Edgar Wilson
