= Fred Dubois =

American politician (1851–1930)

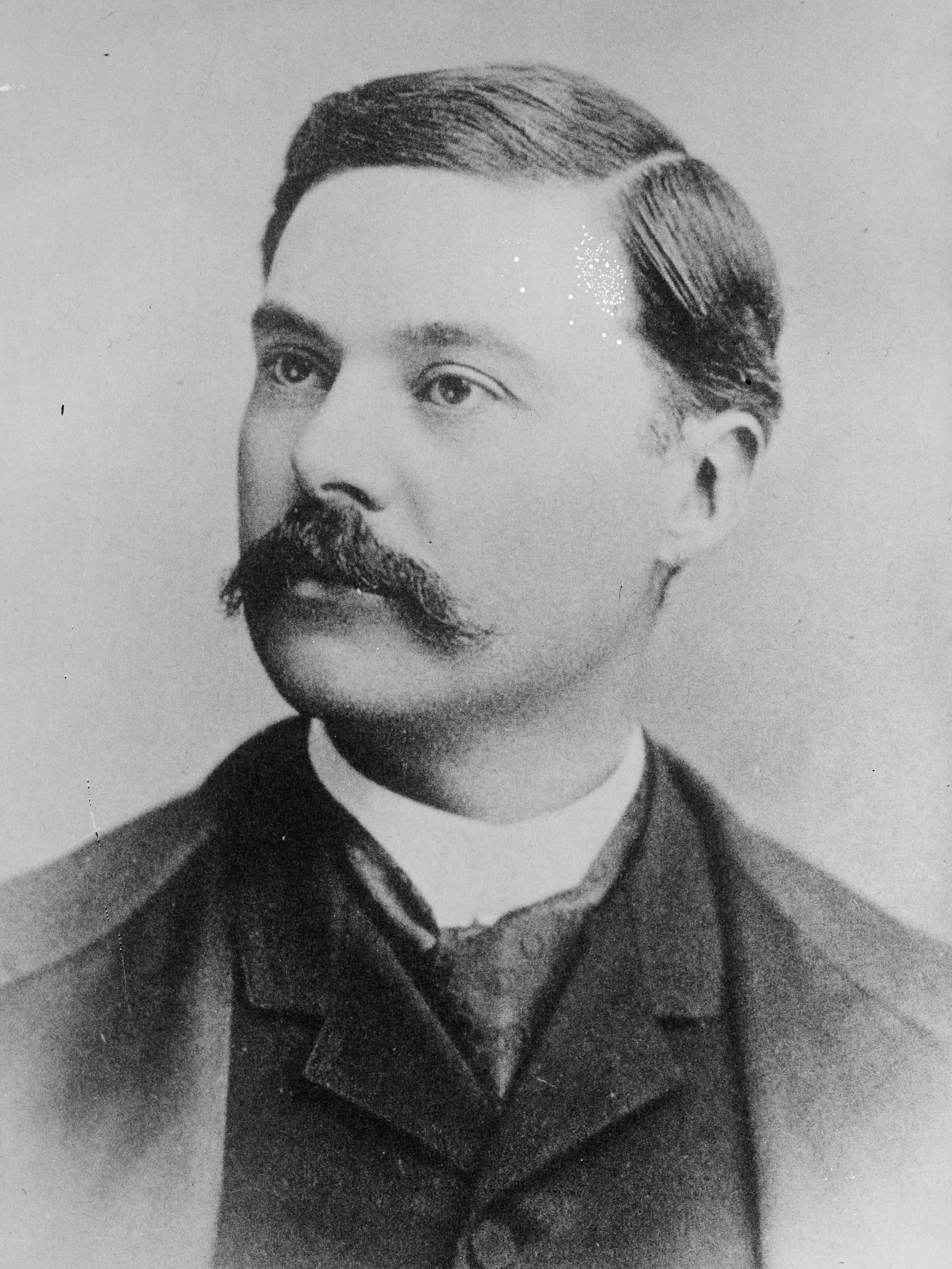

United States Senator from Idaho
- In office March 4, 1901 – March 3, 1907
- Preceded by: George Shoup
- Succeeded by: William Borah
- In office March 4, 1891 – March 3, 1897
- Preceded by: William McConnell
- Succeeded by: Henry Heitfeld

Delegate to the U.S. House of Representatives from Idaho Territory
- In office March 4, 1887 – July 3, 1890
- Preceded by: John Hailey
- Succeeded by: Willis Sweet (as U.S. Representative)

Personal details
- Born: Fred Thomas Dubois; May 29, 1851 Palestine, Illinois, U.S.
- Died: February 14, 1930 (aged 78) Washington, D.C., U.S.
- Resting place: Grove City Cemetery; Blackfoot, Idaho
- Party: Republican (until 1896); Silver Republican (1896–1901); Democratic (after 1901)
- Spouse(s): Edna Maxfield Whited Dubois (1875–1931) (m. 1899–1930, his death)
- Children: 2 daughters
- Parent(s): Jesse Kilgore Dubois (1811–1876); Adelia Morris Dubois (1820–1886)
- Education: Yale College
- Profession: Agriculture

Fred Thomas Dubois (May 29, 1851 – February 14, 1930) was an American politician from Idaho who served two terms in the United States Senate. He was best known for his opposition to the gold standard and his efforts to disenfranchise Mormon voters.

== Early life and career ==
Dubois was of part French-Canadian descent. His paternal grandfather, Toussaint Dubois, was an immigrant who distinguished himself at the Battle of Tippecanoe. Dubois' father, Jesse Kilgore Dubois, was an official at the U.S. Land Office in Palestine, Illinois, a former judge and state legislator, an early supporter of the Republican Party, and a close friend of fellow Illinois Republican Abraham Lincoln. In 1856 the elder Dubois was elected Illinois state auditor and moved the family to the state capital, Springfield.

Fred Dubois studied at Yale College from 1870 to 1872, where he was elected to Scroll and Key. He then participated in business until 1875, when he was appointed to the board of railroad and warehouse commissioners of Illinois. He held this position for one year, resigning shortly before the death of his father. In 1880, he moved to Idaho Territory with his brother, Dr. Jesse Dubois, Jr. (1850–1908), a physician.

In 1882, Dubois was appointed to be the U.S. Marshal for the Idaho Territory. He launched a successful campaign to disenfranchise Mormon voters in the territory on the grounds they broke the law by practicing polygamy.

== Territorial delegate ==
Based on this political success, in 1886 Dubois ran as a Republican for the Congressional delegate position from the territory. He defeated the Democratic incumbent, John Hailey, and remained in the position until Idaho's statehood in 1890.

Dubois strongly supported Idaho's application for statehood and opposed efforts to split the territory among neighboring regions. He reputedly lobbied President Benjamin Harrison in support of Idaho statehood by alluding to the common Battle of Tippecanoe connection between Dubois' grandfather and Harrison's grandfather, President William Henry Harrison.

On July 3, 1890, Dubois requested that Harrison sign the act of statehood on the Independence Day the next day. However, Harrison responded that since the stars are added to the flag every July 4 for every state adopted the previous year, if he did so, Idaho would not get its star on the flag before next year, so Dubois asked him to sign the act immediately, which he did.

== Senator ==
Idaho became a state in July 1890 and that November, Dubois helped engineer a plan for the Idaho Legislature to effectively elect three people to the U.S. Senate: Governor George Shoup to the Class 2 seat up for election in 1894, state constitutional convention member William J. McConnell to serve for the remainder of the 51st Congress, ending in March 1891, and Dubois himself to succeed McConnell and serve a full six-year term in the Class 3 seat beginning in March 1891.

During his first term in the Senate, Dubois concentrated on domestic politics, advocating for positions that he thought would benefit Idaho. He was a strong supporter of tariffs, particularly on wool and lead which Idaho produced much of. He also helped to negotiate a treaty with the Nez Perce Native Americans in 1894. In 1895, commenting on the exemption of the Bannocks from hunting limits, he said, "the extermination [driven over the boundary] of the whole lazy, shiftless non-supporting tribe of Bannocks would not be any great loss."

Dubois' most prominent position, however, was in support of bimetallism. In 1896, he was among those who left the Republican Party to join the Silver Republican faction. He considered having the Idaho Republicans fuse with the Democrats and Populists, but his allies were ousted from the Idaho Republican Party. This disorganization gave control of the Idaho Legislature to the Democrats and Populists. In 1896 Dubois was defeated for reelection in the Idaho Legislature by Populist Henry Heitfeld. After leaving the Senate in 1897, Dubois returned to his ranch in Blackfoot, where he grew alfalfa.

== Return to the Senate ==
As the Silver Republican faction declined, it was thought by many that Dubois' political career was over. But in 1900, after refusing to rejoin the Republican Party, he was elected again to the United States Senate by the Democratic Idaho Legislature by defeating Shoup, his onetime political ally. Shortly after returning to the Senate in 1901, Dubois switched parties and joined the Democratic Party, one of few politicians in that era to do so. He remains the only person in Idaho history to serve in the United States Congress as both a Republican and a Democrat.

During his second term in the Senate, Dubois continued to advocate abandoning the gold standard, but focused most of his attention on opposition to imperialism and Mormonism. Dubois led a group of senators which tried to force Reed Smoot of Utah, the first Mormon ever elected to the Senate, to resign.

Dubois strongly opposed efforts to make the Philippines, which were annexed from Spain after the Spanish–American War, an American territory. Dubois first supported independence for the Philippines, but after a 1905 visit, he declared that Filipinos could not rule themselves and advocated selling the islands to Japan. His reasons for opposing Filipino independence were strongly influenced by racist beliefs. He was afraid of the new territories' economic competition with the rest of America, but not because he believed that the Filipinos presented an economic threat. Dubois disparaged Filipinos and many other ethnic and racial groups, declaring that "It is difficult to get the Filipino to labor at all," and asserting that "The Hawaiians will not labor . . . They are very similar to our American negro." The Philippines posed an economic threat if Japanese laborers migrated there, but he hoped that trade barriers could prevent Philippines sugar and tobacco from reaching American markets. Dubois also supported strong limits on Chinese immigration.

Dubois broke with most Democrats of the day and supported President Theodore Roosevelt's agenda of environmental conservationism. He supported William Randolph Hearst for the Democratic presidential nomination in 1904.

== Defeat and later years ==
Caused in no small part by Dubois' obsession with anti-Mormonism, Democrats in Idaho suffered significant electoral losses during his second term in the Senate. In January 1907, a Republican Idaho Legislature chose prominent Boise attorney William Borah to replace Dubois in the Senate; Borah was reelected five times and served over 32 years.

Dubois lived the rest of his life in Washington, D.C. and made attempts at writing and business, which largely failed. He supported Champ Clark for the Democratic presidential nomination in 1912, but after Clark's defeat, he worked for the Woodrow Wilson campaign in 1912 and 1916. His last major political action was in 1918, when he supported the election of various politicians from both parties in Idaho to support Wilson's progressive agenda, including Borah. Dubois served on the Board of Ordinance from 1918 to 1920 and on a commission on U.S. boundary disputes with Canada from 1924 until his death on February 14, 1930. He was buried at Grove City Cemetery in Blackfoot.

== Legacy ==
In Idaho, the county seat of rural Clark County is Dubois, and there is also Dubois Avenue in Twin Falls. In adjacent Wyoming, the town of Dubois in Fremont County is also named after the former senator. Senator Fred Dubois' 1891 mansion still stands at 320 Southeast Main Street in Blackfoot, Idaho.

== See also ==
- List of United States senators who switched parties

U.S. House of Representatives
Preceded by John Hailey	Delegate to the U.S. House of Representatives from Idaho Territory; 1887–1890	Succeeded by Willis Sweet (U.S. Representative)
U.S. Senate
Preceded by William McConnell	U.S. senator (Class 3) from Idaho; 1891-1897; Served alongside: George Shoup	Succeeded by Henry Heitfeld
Preceded by George Shoup	U.S. senator (Class 2) from Idaho; 1901-1907; Served alongside: Henry Heitfeld, Weldon B. Heyburn	Succeeded by William Borah
