= Logan County, Idaho =

Logan County was a county in Idaho Territory and later the state of Idaho from 1889 to 1895.

Logan County was the subject of multiple controversies during its six-year existence. Alturas County, Logan County's parent county, was Idaho Territory's most politically powerful county in 1889, with 1/6th of all legislators residing within the county to include the lower House Chairman, Mr. H.Z. Burkhart of Hailey. Burkhart naturally opposed an effort to create Logan and Elmore counties from the southern and western portion of Alturas County. Other members of the legislature ultimately were successful in passing the counties' organic legislation on February 7, 1889. Burkhart and J.P. Clough, Legislative Council President from Lemhi County, separately challenged the legality of the act creating Logan County, contending that a group of legislators from both houses reconvened after adjournment in an effort to pass the legislation. Their opponents contended that the gentlemen vacated their positions prior to adjournment, resulting in the selection of new leaders for both the House and Legislative Council. The Supreme Court of Idaho Territory ruled against the gentlemen and the U.S. Supreme Court affirmed the ruling on appeal.

The creation of Logan County clearly marked a significant transition of political power going into the Statehood era. In the 1890 census, Logan County had an enumerated population of 4,169 across 16 precincts and Elmore County had 1,870 residents across 11 precincts, leaving Alturas with 2,620 residents across 15 precincts. Had the 1889 controversy been settled in favor of Alturas, it would have had 8,659 residents across 42 precincts and would have ranked as the 3rd most populous county behind Bingham and Latah counties.

Shoshone, in present day Lincoln County was established as the temporary county seat by the 1889 statute. Later, Bellevue was selected as the county seat with only a majority of votes at the October 1, 1890 general election. County residents in Shoshone unsuccessfully challenged the validity of the election to the Idaho Supreme Court, claiming a 2/3 majority was required by the Idaho Constitution.

The legislature again furthered the controversy on March 7, 1891 when it abolished Alturas and Logan counties, created Lincoln and Alta counties, and established Hailey and Shoshone as county seats. The Idaho Supreme Court ruled the act unconstitutional on June 3, 1891. This effectively restored Alturas and Logan counties with county seats at Bellevue and Hailey.

Finally, on March 5, 1895, the legislature succeeded at what it attempted to do in 1891 by combining Logan and Alturas Counties into a new county called Blaine with its county seat at Hailey. Two weeks later on March 18, Lincoln County was created from the southern portion of Blaine County, containing the exact boundary and county seat established in 1891. The Idaho Supreme Court again weighed in on the matter in 1896. This time, it held the creation of Blaine County to be constitutional, finalizing the abolishment of Logan County effective from the creation date of Blaine County.

== See also ==
- List of former United States counties
- List of counties in Idaho

== Sources ==
- Alturas County Seat, 1864
- Digital Atlas of Idaho
