= William H. Clagett =

American politician (1838–1901)

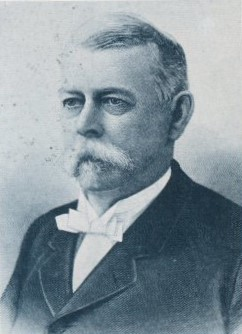

Delegate to and President of the Idaho Constitutional Convention
- In office July 4, 1889 – August 6, 1889
- Constituency: Shoshone County

Delegate to the U.S. House of Representatives from Montana Territory
- In office March 4, 1871 – March 3, 1873
- Preceded by: James M. Cavanaugh
- Succeeded by: Martin Maginnis

Member of the Nevada Assembly
- In office 1874–1875

Member of the Nevada Territorial House of Representatives
- In office 1862–1863

Personal details
- Born: September 21, 1838 Upper Marlboro, Maryland, U.S.
- Died: August 3, 1901 (aged 62) Spokane, Washington, U.S.
- Party: Republican
- Spouse: Mary E. Hart (m. 1861)
- Children: 9
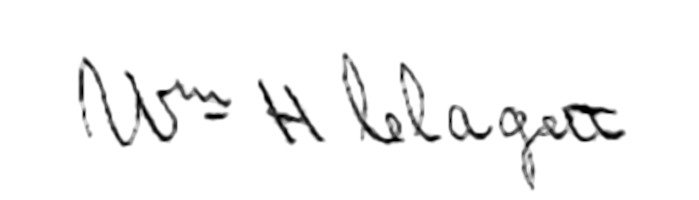
- Signature

William Horace Clagett (September 21, 1838 – August 3, 1901) was a nineteenth-century politician and lawyer from various places in the United States. He was the uncle of Samuel B. Pettengill.

Born in Upper Marlboro, Maryland, Clagett moved to Keokuk, Iowa with his father in 1850 where he attended the public schools as a child. He studied law in Keokuk and at a law school in Albany, New York and was admitted to the bar in 1858, commencing practice in Keokuk. He married Mary E. Hart, a niece of Oliver P. Morton, in Iowa in 1861, and they would have nine children. He moved to Carson City, Nevada in 1861 and to Humboldt City, Nevada in 1862 where he commenced practicing law. Clagett was a member of the Nevada Territorial House of Representatives in 1862 and 1863, was a member of the Nevada Assembly in 1864 and 1865 and practiced law in Virginia City, Nevada, Helena, Montana and Deer Lodge, Montana. He was elected a Republican from the Montana Territory to the United States House of Representatives in 1870, serving from 1871 to 1873, being unsuccessful for reelection in 1872.

On December 18, 1871, at the urging of Ferdinand Vandeveer Hayden and after learning of the findings of the Hayden Geological Survey of 1871, Clagett introduced the Act of Dedication bill into the House that ultimately led to the creation of Yellowstone National Park. Clagett Butte in Yellowstone is named for his honor.

Afterwards leaving Congress, Clagett resumed practicing law in Deer Lodge, Montana, Denver, Colorado, Deadwood, Dakota, Portland, Oregon and Coeur d'Alene, Idaho. He was president of the Idaho Constitutional Convention in 1889 and was an unsuccessful candidate for the United States Senate from Idaho in 1891 and 1895. He moved to Spokane, Washington and resumed practicing law until his death there on August 3, 1901. Clagett was interred in Greenwood Cemetery in Spokane.

== Notes ==
Political offices
Preceded by James M. Cavanaugh	Delegate to the U.S. House of Representatives from Montana's at-large congressional district March 4, 1871 – March 3, 1873	Succeeded by Martin Maginnis
