= Silver Republican Party =

- Other name: Lincoln Republican Party (1900)
- Leader: Fred Dubois; Henry M. Teller
- Founded: 1896; 130 years ago
- Dissolved: 1901; 125 years ago
- Split from: Republican Party
- Merged into: Republican Party; Democratic Party (minority)
- Ideology: Agrarianism; Bimetallism; Populism; Silver mining interests
- Political position: Center-left

The Silver Republican Party, later known as the Lincoln Republican Party, was a United States political party from 1896 to 1901. It was so named because it split from the Republican Party by supporting free silver (effectively, expansionary monetary policy) and bimetallism. The main Republican Party opposed free silver and supported the gold standard. The strength of the Silver Republicans was concentrated in the Western United States, where silver mining was an important industry. A leading spokesman in the House of Representatives was Willis Sweet of Idaho. Silver Republicans were elected to the Congress from several Western states. In both the 1896 and 1900 presidential elections, Silver Republicans supported Democratic presidential nominee William Jennings Bryan over Republican nominee William McKinley.

In 1901, the Silver Republican Party disbanded and most of its members rejoined the Republican Party, particularly after Theodore Roosevelt became president in September 1901 following William McKinley's assassination. However, some Silver Republicans, such as Senator Fred Dubois of Idaho and former Secretary of the Interior Henry M. Teller of Colorado, joined the Democratic Party instead in order to aid the Bryan wing of the party against the conservative Bourbon Democrats.

== Noted Silver Republicans ==
- Jonathan Bourne Jr. – Senator from Oregon
- Frank J. Cannon – Senator from Utah
- Fred Dubois – Senator from Idaho
- Lee Mantle – Senator from Montana
- Richard F. Pettigrew – Senator from South Dakota
- John F. Shafroth – Representative from Colorado, later Governor and Senator
- Willis Sweet – Representative from Idaho
- William Morris Stewart – Senator from Nevada
- Henry M. Teller – Senator and Secretary of the Interior from Colorado
- Edgar Wilson – Representative from Idaho
- Charles A. Towne – Senator from Minnesota

== See also ==
- National Democratic Party, the party of gold supporters who left the Democratic Party in 1896
- Silver Party
