= Placerville, Idaho =

- City
- Location of Placerville in Boise County, Idaho.
- Coordinates: 43°56′34″N 115°56′46″W
- Country: United States
- State: Idaho
- County: Boise

Area
  - Total: 1.00 sq mi (2.59 km^{2})
  - Land: 1.00 sq mi (2.59 km^{2})
  - Water: 0 sq mi (0.00 km^{2})
- Elevation: 4,308 ft (1,313 m)

Population (2020)
  - Total: 48
  - Density: 48/sq mi (19/km^{2})
- Time zone: UTC-7 (Mountain (MST))
  - Summer (DST): UTC-6 (MDT)
- ZIP code: 83666
- Area codes: 208, 986
- FIPS code: 16-63550
- GNIS feature ID: 2411434
- Website: placervilleidaho.org

- Placerville Historic District
- U.S. National Register of Historic Places
- U.S. Historic district
- Location within Idaho Location within the United States
- Location: Roughly bounded by the townsite limits
- Coordinates: 43°56′35″N 115°56′49″W
- Area: 61 acres (25 ha)
- Built: 1862
- Architect: Multiple
- Architectural style: Colonial Revival, Queen Anne
- NRHP reference No.: 84001029
- Added to NRHP: September 7, 1984

Placerville is a populated place in Boise County, Idaho, United States. The population was 48 at the 2020 census. It is part of the Boise City–Nampa, Idaho Metropolitan Statistical Area.

== History ==
Placerville received its name because of placer mining in the vicinity. The ghost town is located 17 miles east of Horseshoe Bend. The townsite was selected December 1, 1862; and by December 16 there were six cabins in the camp. By the early summer of 1863, the town had 300 buildings and a population of 5,000. At the meeting of the first legislature held in Lewiston in 1863, the citizens obtained a charter for their city. Father Mesplie, a Catholic priest, held the first church service January 4, 1864, and in that same year a stage line was established between the Basin and Wallua to carry Wells Fargo express. It ran every other day from Placerville and went through in four days. By July 1864, 4500 claims had been recorded in the district.

Unlike the earlier northern Idaho mining areas of Florence (northeast of Riggins) and Pierce, the Boise Basin mines provided good returns over a period of many years, the peak years being 1863–66, during and immediately after the Civil War. For that reason the Boise Basin rush was significant an early Idaho settlement, bringing a substantial number of people who stayed to establish towns and providing a population base for retailing and agricultural settlement in the Boise Valley. Boise Basin had a higher percentage of families than did most mining areas, and the major towns, like Placerville and Idaho City, acquired substantial buildings, lodges, churches, schools, and post offices. Placerville was unusual in that it even had a street grid and a town square, known locally as the "plaza." Additionally it had an Episcopal church-which is still in use currently, thirteen saloons, seven restaurants, five butcher shops, five blacksmith shops, as well as hotels, druggists, express agents, bakeries, livery barns, carpenters, sawmills, and –attesting to the presence of women—dressmakers and a millinery shop.

Mining in Placerville began with placer workings for gold, but miners soon turned to quartz mining as well. By 1864, a stamp mill was working in the area. Hydraulic giants were also used. By 1870, however, much of the excess population of the region had been drained off to other mining rushes and returns on claims had fallen somewhat. The population in Placerville shrank from 2500 in 1864 to 318 in 1870. By that time a good percentage of the population was Chinese, as the Chinese were allowed to work the less rewarding claims that the white miners would not touch. The Chinese also established services like laundries and restaurants.

Only few early buildings remain in Placerville: as was the case in most mining towns, Placerville suffered more than once from fires that burned a large part of the town. The fire that is most remembered is the 1899 fire, which practically destroyed the town. The streetscape remaining today dates mostly from the rebuilding immediately after that fire and another fire that burned several buildings ten months later.

During the war years Placerville just maintained like the rest of the nation. Wartime restrictions included a suspension of the mining industry. There was no growth — only a feeling of "things have to get better."

In the early 1970s the upper lots were auctioned off creating what was and are now known as the "upper subdivision." There were both permanent and vacation homes built on these lots. Then as now there was only one business in Placerville, the city store.

Placerville continues to survive with the few full-time residents and some part-time residents. The Village Market store has closed but Donna's Place II is open. The tourism industry which includes among others, history seekers, hunters and ATV and snowmobile recreationalists also continue to add life to the small city. The incorporated city is governed by a mayor and city council which meets regularly at City Hall. The city is served by the Placerville Fire Department which has its fire station located adjacent to the city plaza and the East Boise County ambulance service. There are two city museums which are maintained by public donation and volunteers and are open weekends from Memorial Day to Labor Day and by special request.

In 1984, the settled areas of the city were listed on the National Register of Historic Places as a historic district, the "Placerville Historic District."

== Geography ==
According to the United States Census Bureau, the city has a total area of 1.01 square miles (2.62 km^{2}), all of it land.

== Notable people ==
- Hunter McReynolds, inventor of the McReynolds Process, which is the stable method of manufacturing (2,4,6-trinitrobenzyl)hydrazine

== Demographics ==
Historical population
Census	Pop.	Note	%±
1880	426		—
1900	230		—
1910	187		−18.7%
1930	116		—
1940	146		25.9%
1950	17		−88.4%
1960	12		−29.4%
1970	14		16.7%
1980	20		42.9%
1990	14		−30.0%
2000	60		328.6%
2010	53		−11.7%
2020	48		−9.4%
U.S. Decennial Census

=== 2010 census ===
As of the census of 2010, there were 53 people, 25 households, and 16 families residing in the city. The population density was 52.5 inhabitants per square mile (20.3/km^{2}). There were 74 housing units at an average density of 73.3 per square mile (28.3/km^{2}). The racial makeup of the city was 96.2% White and 3.8% from two or more races. Hispanic or Latino of any race were 3.8% of the population.

There were 25 households, of which 20.0% had children under the age of 18 living with them, 52.0% were married couples living together, 8.0% had a female householder with no husband present, 4.0% had a male householder with no wife present, and 36.0% were non-families. 32.0% of all households were made up of individuals, and 16% had someone living alone who was 65 years of age or older. The average household size was 2.12 and the average family size was 2.63.

The median age in the city was 55.3 years. 20.8% of residents were under the age of 18; 3.8% were between the ages of 18 and 24; 17% were from 25 to 44; 41.5% were from 45 to 64; and 17% were 65 years of age or older. The gender makeup of the city was 58.5% male and 41.5% female.

=== 2000 census ===
As of the census of 2000, there were 60 people, 30 households, and 23 families residing in the city. The population density was 59.9 inhabitants per square mile (23.1/km^{2}). There were 77 housing units at an average density of 76.9 per square mile (29.7/km^{2}). The racial makeup of the city was 100.00% White.

There were 30 households, out of which 10.0% had children under the age of 18 living with them, 60.0% were married couples living together, 13.3% had a female householder with no husband present, and 23.3% were non-families. 23.3% of all households were made up of individuals, and 10.0% had someone living alone who was 65 years of age or older. The average household size was 2.00 and the average family size was 2.22.

In the city, the population was spread out, with 11.7% under the age of 18, 11.7% from 25 to 44, 50.0% from 45 to 64, and 26.7% who were 65 years of age or older. The median age was 55 years. For every 100 females, there were 114.3 males. For every 100 females age 18 and over, there were 112.0 males.

The median income for a household in the city was $30,625, and the median income for a family was $35,625. Males had a median income of $53,750 versus $30,208 for females. The per capita income for the city was $20,298. There were no families and 11.3% of the population living below the poverty line, including no under eighteens and 20.0% of those over 64.

=== Population history ===
- 1864 - 2,500
- 1863 - 3,254
