= Alturas County, Idaho =

Former county of Idaho, United States (1864–1895)

Coordinates: 43.6889°N 115.2910°W

Alturas County was a county in Idaho Territory and later the state of Idaho from 1864 to 1895. It covered an area larger than the states of Maryland, New Jersey, and Delaware combined. Most present-day southern Idaho counties were created at least in part from the original Alturas County area. The name Alturas comes from a Spanish word for "mountain summits" or "mountainous heights."

Alturas County was created by the Idaho Territorial Legislature in February 1864. Later that year the mining camp of Rocky Bar was designated the county seat. The county seat was moved to Hailey in 1882.

In 1889, the Idaho Territorial Legislature created Elmore County and Logan County from parts of Alturas County. On March 5, 1895, to circumvent a recent state supreme court decision striking down an earlier county reorganization, the Idaho Legislature combined Alturas and Logan Counties into a new county called Blaine. Two weeks later on March 18, the southern portion of the newly created Blaine County was split off to form Lincoln County with its county seat at Shoshone. Hailey remained the county seat of what was now Blaine County, and Alturas County disappeared from the Idaho map.

== See also ==
- List of former United States counties
- List of counties in Idaho

== Sources ==
- Alturas County Seat, 1864
- Digital Atlas of Idaho
