= Idaho's congressional delegations =

Map of Idaho's two congressional districts for the United States House of Representatives since 2023

Since Idaho became a U.S. state in 1890, it has sent congressional delegations to the United States Senate and United States House of Representatives, beginning with the 51st United States Congress. Prior to 1890, Idaho sent non-voting delegates to the House of Representatives from 1864 to 1889. Each state elects two senators to serve for six years in general elections, with their re-election staggered. Prior to the ratification of the Seventeenth Amendment in 1913, senators were elected by the Idaho Legislature. Each state elects a varying number of, but at least one, member of the House, depending on population, to two-year terms. Idaho has sent two members to the House in each congressional delegation since the 1910 United States census.

A total of 63 unique individuals have represented Idaho in Congress; Idaho has had 26 senators and 44 representatives, and 7 have served in both the House and the Senate. Two women from Idaho, Gracie Pfost and Helen Chenoweth, have served in the House, while none have served in the Senate.

Mike Crapo is currently the dean, or longest-serving member of Congress, of the Idaho delegation, having served in Congress since his election to the House of Representatives in 1992. Since 1998, he has been serving in the Senate. Crapo is the second-longest serving senator in Idaho history, after William Borah.

== Current delegation ==
Current U.S. senators from Idaho
| Idaho CPVI (2025): R+18 | Class II senator | Class III senator |
|---|---|---|
| Idaho CPVI (2025): R+18 | Jim Risch (Junior senator) (Boise) | Mike Crapo (Senior senator) (Idaho Falls) |
| Party | Republican | Republican |
| Incumbent since | January 3, 2009 | January 3, 1999 |

Idaho's current congressional delegation in the 119th Congress consists of its two senators and two representatives, all of whom are Republicans. Idaho has not elected a Democratic member of Congress since Walt Minnick was elected in 2008; he was defeated by Republican Raúl Labrador two years later in 2010.

As of April 2025, the Cook Partisan Voting Index, a measure of how strongly partisan congressional districts and states are, ranked both Idaho congressional districts and the state as a whole as solidly Republican.

The dean, or longest-serving member of Congress, of the Idaho delegation is currently Mike Crapo, who has been serving in Congress since his election to the House of Representatives in 1992. After serving in the House for three terms, he was elected to the Senate in 1998. Crapo is the second-longest serving senator in Idaho history, after William Borah, and is the first member of the Church of Latter-Day Saints to represent Idaho in the Senate. Mike Simpson, who represents Idaho's 2nd congressional district, is tied with Burton L. French as the longest-serving representative from Idaho, both having been elected for thirteen terms.

Current U.S. representatives from Idaho
| District | Member (Residence) | Party | Incumbent since | CPVI (2025) | District map |
|---|---|---|---|---|---|
| 1st | Russ Fulcher (Meridian) | Republican | January 3, 2019 | R+22 | Map of Idaho's 1st congressional district |
| 2nd | Mike Simpson (Idaho Falls) | Republican | January 3, 1999 | R+13 | Map of Idaho's 2nd congressional district |

== United States Senate ==
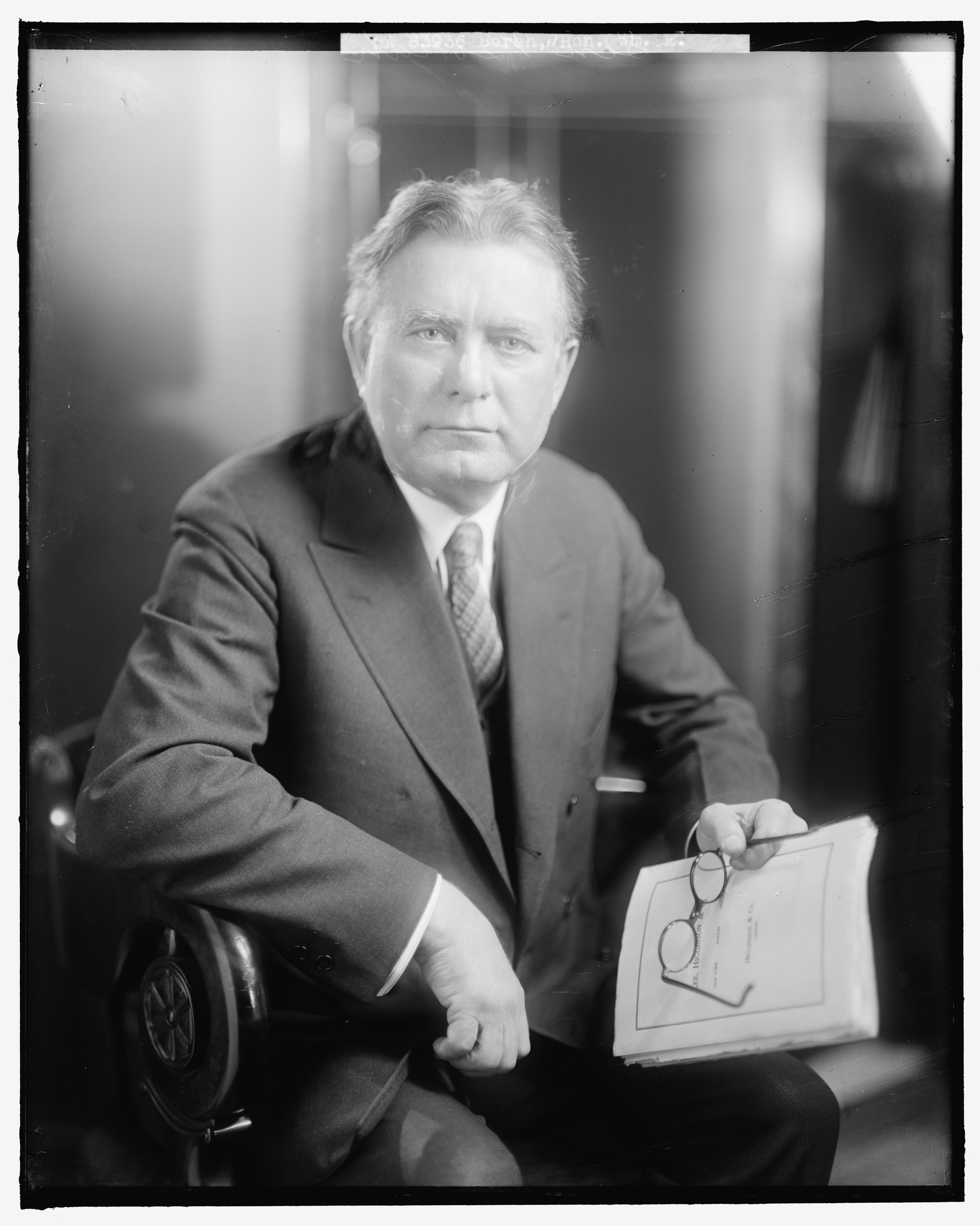
William Borah, Idaho senator who advocated for the passage of the Sixteenth and Seventeenth Amendments, establishing the graduated income tax and popular election of Senators, respectively, but opposed the Nineteenth Amendment, which prohibited disenfranchisement on account of sex

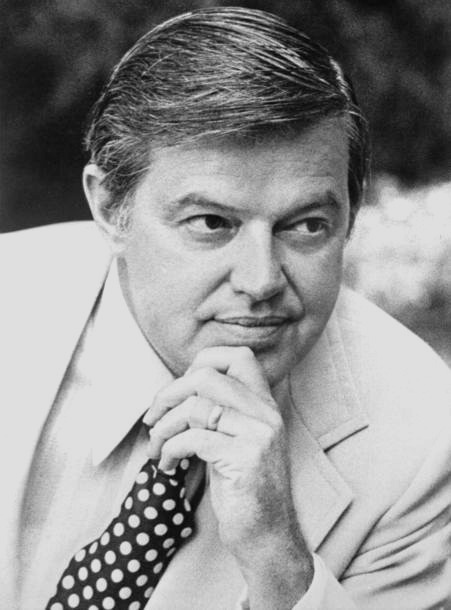
Frank Church, the last Democratic Idaho senator, known for chairing the Church Committee

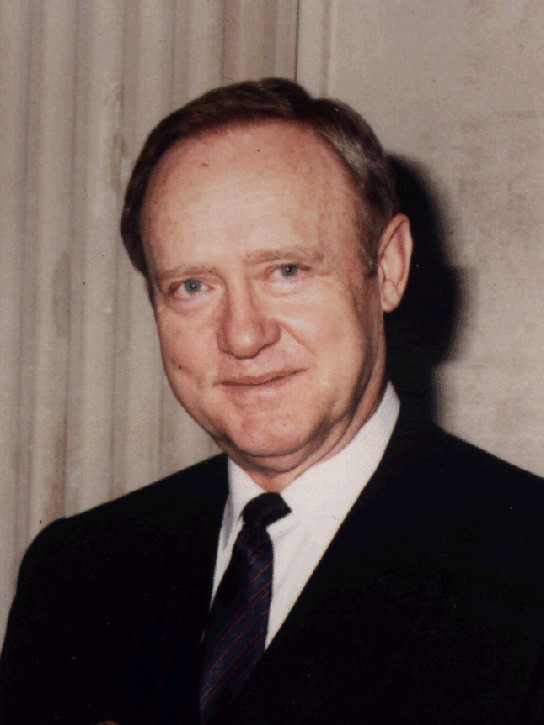
Jim McClure, senator from Idaho who chaired the Senate Republican Conference from 1981 to 1985

26 people have served as a U.S. senator from Idaho, all of them men. The longest-serving senator from Idaho, William Borah, was an influential Republican legislator who eventually became the dean of the Senate during his 33 years of service. He was known for his political views independent of the Republican Party and influence on the United States Senate Committee on Foreign Relations, eventually becoming its chairman. He was instrumental in the passage of the Sixteenth and the Seventeenth Amendments, establishing the graduated income tax and popular election of Senators, respectively, but opposed the Nineteenth Amendment, which prohibited disenfranchisement the right to vote on account of sex. The last Democratic senator from Idaho was Frank Church, who similarly served for 24 years on the Foreign Relations Committee, including two years as chairman. He also served as chairman of the Church Committee, whose reports helped pass the Foreign Intelligence Surveillance Act of 1978. Senator Jim McClure also rose to leadership positions, including as the chairman of the Senate Republican Conference from 1981 to 1985, and as the chairman of the United States Senate Committee on Energy and Natural Resources.

Senators are elected every six years depending on their class, with each senator serving a six-year term, and elections for senators occurring every two years, rotating through each class such that in each election, around one-third of the seats in the Senate are up for election. Idaho's senators are elected in classes II and III.

Democratic (D) Populist (Pop) Republican (R)

Senators from Idaho
| Class II senator | Congress | Class III senator |
|---|---|---|
| George L. Shoup (R) | 51st (1889–1891) | William McConnell (R) |
| George L. Shoup (R) | 52nd (1891–1893) | Fred Dubois (R) |
| George L. Shoup (R) | 53rd (1893–1895) | Fred Dubois (R) |
| George L. Shoup (R) | 54th (1895–1897) | Fred Dubois (R) |
| George L. Shoup (R) | 55th (1897–1899) | Henry Heitfeld (Pop) |
| George L. Shoup (R) | 56th (1899–1901) | Henry Heitfeld (Pop) |
| Fred Dubois (D) | 57th (1901–1903) | Henry Heitfeld (Pop) |
| Fred Dubois (D) | 58th (1903–1905) | Weldon B. Heyburn (R) (Note: Senator Heyburn died in office.) |
| Fred Dubois (D) | 59th (1905–1907) | Weldon B. Heyburn (R) |
| William Borah (R) (Note: Senator Borah died in office.) | 60th (1907–1909) | Weldon B. Heyburn (R) |
| William Borah (R) | 61st (1909–1911) | Weldon B. Heyburn (R) |
| William Borah (R) | 62nd (1911–1913) | Weldon B. Heyburn (R) |
| William Borah (R) | 62nd (1911–1913) | Kirtland I. Perky (D) (Note: Senator Perky was appointed to the position in November 1912 by Governor James H. Hawley to fill the vacancy caused by Senator Heyburn's death. When Senator James H. Brady was elected to fill Hawley's empty seat in January 1913, Senator Perky was replaced.) |
| William Borah (R) | 62nd (1911–1913) | James H. Brady (R) (Note: Senator Brady died in office.) |
| William Borah (R) | 63rd (1913–1915) | James H. Brady (R) |
| William Borah (R) | 64th (1915–1917) | James H. Brady (R) |
| William Borah (R) | 65th (1917–1919) | James H. Brady (R) |
| William Borah (R) | 65th (1917–1919) | John F. Nugent (D) (Note: Senator Nugent resigned from the Senate to become the chairman of the Federal Trade Commission, appointed by President Woodrow Wilson.) |
| William Borah (R) | 66th (1919–1921) | John F. Nugent (D) |
| William Borah (R) | 66th (1919–1921) | Frank R. Gooding (R) (Note: Senator Gooding died in office.) |
| William Borah (R) | 67th (1921–1923) | Frank R. Gooding (R) |
| William Borah (R) | 68th (1923–1925) | Frank R. Gooding (R) |
| William Borah (R) | 69th (1925–1927) | Frank R. Gooding (R) |
| William Borah (R) | 70th (1927–1929) | Frank R. Gooding (R) |
| William Borah (R) | 70th (1927–1929) | John Thomas (R) |
| William Borah (R) | 71st (1929–1931) | John Thomas (R) |
| William Borah (R) | 72nd (1931–1933) | John Thomas (R) |
| William Borah (R) | 73rd (1933–1935) | James P. Pope (D) |
| William Borah (R) | 74th (1935–1937) | James P. Pope (D) |
| William Borah (R) | 75th (1937–1939) | James P. Pope (D) |
| William Borah (R) | 76th (1939–1941) | D. Worth Clark (D) |
| John Thomas (R) (Note: Senator Thomas died while in office.) | 76th (1939–1941) | D. Worth Clark (D) |
| John Thomas (R) | 77th (1941–1943) | D. Worth Clark (D) |
| John Thomas (R) | 78th (1943–1945) | D. Worth Clark (D) |
| John Thomas (R) | 79th (1945–1947) | Glen H. Taylor (D) |
| Charles C. Gossett (D) (Note: Senator Gossett resigned from his position as Governor of Idaho and was appointed by Governor Arnold Williams, who was his lieutenant governor, to fill the seat of Senator John Thomas.) | 79th (1945–1947) | Glen H. Taylor (D) |
| Henry Dworshak (R) | 79th (1945–1947) | Glen H. Taylor (D) |
| Henry Dworshak (R) | 80th (1947–1949) | Glen H. Taylor (D) |
| Bert H. Miller (D) (Note: Senator Miller died in office.) | 81st (1949–1951) | Glen H. Taylor (D) |
| Henry Dworshak (R) (Note: Senator Dworshak died while in office.) | 81st (1949–1951) | Glen H. Taylor (D) |
| Henry Dworshak (R) | 82nd (1951–1953) | Herman Welker (R) |
| Henry Dworshak (R) | 83rd (1953–1955) | Herman Welker (R) |
| Henry Dworshak (R) | 84th (1955–1957) | Herman Welker (R) |
| Henry Dworshak (R) | 85th (1957–1959) | Frank Church (D) |
| Henry Dworshak (R) | 86th (1959–1961) | Frank Church (D) |
| Henry Dworshak (R) | 87th (1961–1963) | Frank Church (D) |
| Len Jordan (R) | 87th (1961–1963) | Frank Church (D) |
| Len Jordan (R) | 88th (1963–1965) | Frank Church (D) |
| Len Jordan (R) | 89th (1965–1967) | Frank Church (D) |
| Len Jordan (R) | 90th (1967–1969) | Frank Church (D) |
| Len Jordan (R) | 91st (1969–1971) | Frank Church (D) |
| Len Jordan (R) | 92nd (1971–1973) | Frank Church (D) |
| Jim McClure (R) | 93rd (1973–1975) | Frank Church (D) |
| Jim McClure (R) | 94th (1975–1977) | Frank Church (D) |
| Jim McClure (R) | 95th (1977–1979) | Frank Church (D) |
| Jim McClure (R) | 96th (1979–1981) | Frank Church (D) |
| Jim McClure (R) | 97th (1981–1983) | Steve Symms (R) |
| Jim McClure (R) | 98th (1983–1985) | Steve Symms (R) |
| Jim McClure (R) | 99th (1985–1987) | Steve Symms (R) |
| Jim McClure (R) | 100th (1987–1989) | Steve Symms (R) |
| Jim McClure (R) | 101st (1989–1991) | Steve Symms (R) |
| Larry Craig (R) | 102nd (1991–1993) | Steve Symms (R) |
| Larry Craig (R) | 103rd (1993–1995) | Dirk Kempthorne (R) |
| Larry Craig (R) | 104th (1995–1997) | Dirk Kempthorne (R) |
| Larry Craig (R) | 105th (1997–1999) | Dirk Kempthorne (R) |
| Larry Craig (R) | 106th (1999–2001) | Mike Crapo (R) |
| Larry Craig (R) | 107th (2001–2003) | Mike Crapo (R) |
| Larry Craig (R) | 108th (2003–2005) | Mike Crapo (R) |
| Larry Craig (R) | 109th (2005–2007) | Mike Crapo (R) |
| Larry Craig (R) | 110th (2007–2009) | Mike Crapo (R) |
| Jim Risch (R) | 111th (2009–2011) | Mike Crapo (R) |
| Jim Risch (R) | 112th (2011–2013) | Mike Crapo (R) |
| Jim Risch (R) | 113th (2013–2015) | Mike Crapo (R) |
| Jim Risch (R) | 114th (2015–2017) | Mike Crapo (R) |
| Jim Risch (R) | 115th (2017–2019) | Mike Crapo (R) |
| Jim Risch (R) | 116th (2019–2021) | Mike Crapo (R) |
| Jim Risch (R) | 117th (2021–2023) | Mike Crapo (R) |
| Jim Risch (R) | 118th (2023–2025) | Mike Crapo (R) |
| Jim Risch (R) | 119th (2025–2027) | Mike Crapo (R) |

== United States House of Representatives ==
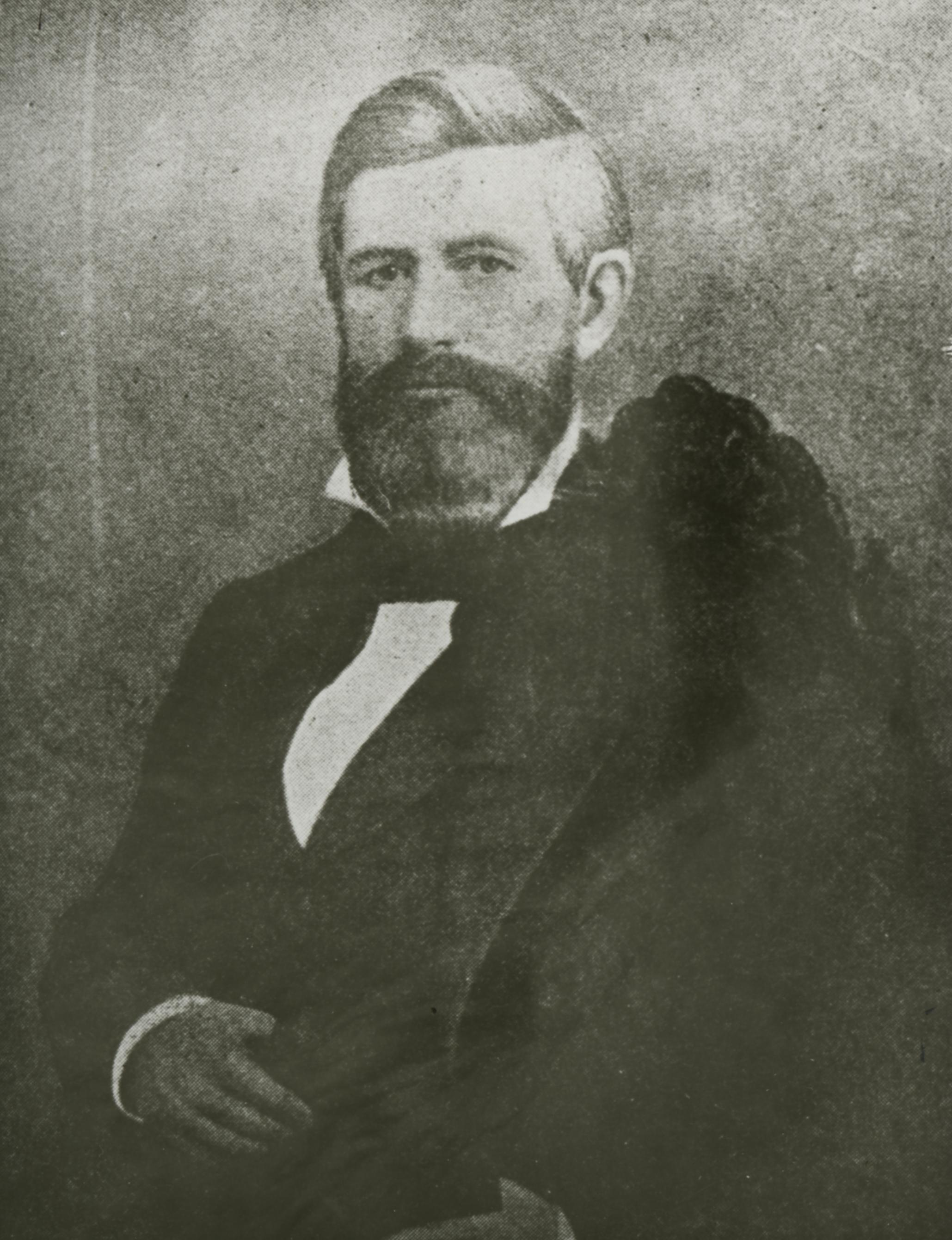
William H. Wallace, the first person to represent Idaho in Congress, as a non-voting delegate, who had also served as Idaho's first territorial governor

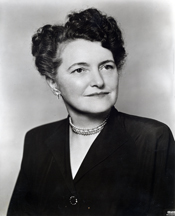
Gracie Pfost, the first female member of the House from Idaho

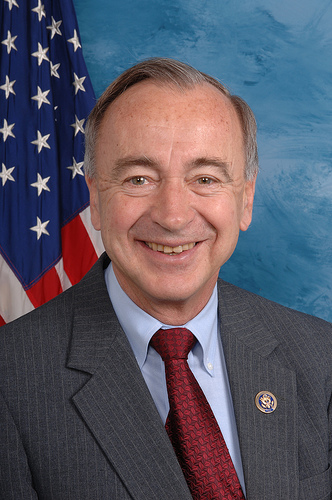
Walt Minnick, the last Democrat to have represented Idaho in Congress

Since the establishment of Idaho Territory, 44 people have served Idaho in the House of Representatives. Of those, only two have been women: Gracie Pfost, who served in the House from 1953 to 1962, and Helen Chenoweth, who served in the House from 1995 to 2000. No African-Americans have ever served Idaho in the House.

From 1864 to 1890, Idaho elected a non-voting delegate to the House. After statehood in 1890, the state sent one member to the House until 1913, when Idaho gained a seat in the House after the 1910 census. The representatives were elected at-large until Idaho's congressional districts were drawn in 1919. Idaho has sent two members to the House in each congressional delegation since then. One member of the House of Representatives is sent from each district via a popular vote. Districts are redrawn every ten years, after data from the US Census is collected.

=== 1864–1890: 1 non-voting delegate ===
Starting on February 1, 1864, Idaho Territory sent a non-voting delegate to the House.

Democratic (D) Independent (I) Republican (R)

Delegates to the House of Representatives from Idaho from 1864 to 1890
| Congress | Delegate from territory's at-large district |
|---|---|
| 38th (1863–1865) | William H. Wallace (R) |
| 39th (1865–1867) | Edward D. Holbrook (D) |
| 40th (1867–1869) | Edward D. Holbrook (D) |
| 41st (1869–1871) | Jacob K. Shafer (D) |
| 42nd (1871–1873) | Samuel A. Merritt (D) |
| 43rd (1873–1875) | John Hailey (D) |
| 44th (1875–1877) | Thomas W. Bennett (I) (Note: Representative Bennett's election to Congress was successfully contested by Stephen S. Fenn, who succeeded him on June 23, 1876.) |
| 44th (1875–1877) | Stephen S. Fenn (D) |
| 45th (1877–1879) | Stephen S. Fenn (D) |
| 46th (1879–1881) | George Ainslie (D) |
| 47th (1881–1883) | George Ainslie (D) |
| 48th (1883–1885) | Theodore Frelinghuysen Singiser (R) |
| 49th (1885–1887) | John Hailey (D) |
| 50th (1887–1889) | Fred Dubois (R) |
| 51st (1889–1891) | Fred Dubois (R) |

=== 1890–1913: 1 seat ===
Following statehood on July 3, 1890, Idaho had one seat in the House.

Democratic (D) Populist Party (United States) (Pop) Republican (R) Silver Republican (SvR)

Members of the House of Representatives from Idaho from 1890 to 1913
| Congress | At-large district |
|---|---|
| 51st (1889–1891) | Willis Sweet (R) |
| 52nd (1891–1893) | Willis Sweet (R) |
| 53rd (1893–1895) | Willis Sweet (R) |
| 54th (1895–1897) | Edgar Wilson (R) |
| 55th (1897–1899) | James Gunn (Pop) |
| 56th (1899–1901) | Edgar Wilson (SvR) |
| 57th (1901–1903) | Thomas L. Glenn (Pop) |
| 58th (1903–1905) | Burton L. French (R) |
| 59th (1905–1907) | Burton L. French (R) |
| 60th (1907–1909) | Burton L. French (R) |
| 61st (1909–1911) | Thomas R. Hamer (R) |
| 62nd (1911–1913) | Burton L. French (R) |

=== 1913–present: 2 seats ===
Following the 1910 census, Idaho was apportioned a second seat. It elected both seats statewide at-large on a general ticket, until 1919, when it redistricted into two districts.

Democratic (D) Republican (R)

Members of the House of Representatives from Idaho from 1913 to 1919
| Congress | Elected on a general ticket from Idaho's at-large district | |
| Congress | 1st seat | 2nd seat |
|---|---|---|
| 63rd (1913–1915) | Burton L. French (R) | Addison T. Smith (R) |
| 64th (1915–1917) | Robert M. McCracken (R) | Addison T. Smith (R) |
| 65th (1917–1919) | Burton L. French (R) | Addison T. Smith (R) |

Members of the House of Representatives from Idaho from 1919 to present
| Congress | Districts | |
| Congress | 1st | 2nd |
|---|---|---|
| 66th (1919–1921) | Burton L. French (R) | Addison T. Smith (R) |
| 67th (1921–1923) | Burton L. French (R) | Addison T. Smith (R) |
| 68th (1923–1925) | Burton L. French (R) | Addison T. Smith (R) |
| 69th (1925–1927) | Burton L. French (R) | Addison T. Smith (R) |
| 70th (1927–1929) | Burton L. French (R) | Addison T. Smith (R) |
| 71st (1929–1931) | Burton L. French (R) | Addison T. Smith (R) |
| 72nd (1931–1933) | Burton L. French (R) | Addison T. Smith (R) |
| 73rd (1933–1935) | Compton I. White (D) | Thomas C. Coffin (D) (Note: Representative Coffin died while in office.) |
| 74th (1935–1937) | Compton I. White (D) | D. Worth Clark (D) |
| 75th (1937–1939) | Compton I. White (D) | D. Worth Clark (D) |
| 76th (1939–1941) | Compton I. White (D) | Henry Dworshak (R) (Note: Representative Dworshak resigned on November 5, 1946, to serve Idaho in the Senate.) |
| 77th (1941–1943) | Compton I. White (D) | Henry Dworshak (R) |
| 78th (1943–1945) | Compton I. White (D) | Henry Dworshak (R) |
| 79th (1945–1947) | Compton I. White (D) | Henry Dworshak (R) |
| 80th (1947–1949) | Abe Goff (R) | John C. Sanborn (R) |
| 81st (1949–1951) | Compton I. White (D) | John C. Sanborn (R) |
| 82nd (1951–1953) | John Travers Wood (R) | Hamer H. Budge (R) |
| 83rd (1953–1955) | Gracie Pfost (D) | Hamer H. Budge (R) |
| 84th (1955–1957) | Gracie Pfost (D) | Hamer H. Budge (R) |
| 85th (1957–1959) | Gracie Pfost (D) | Hamer H. Budge (R) |
| 86th (1959–1961) | Gracie Pfost (D) | Hamer H. Budge (R) |
| 87th (1961–1963) | Gracie Pfost (D) | Ralph Harding (D) |
| 88th (1963–1965) | Compton I. White Jr. (D) | Ralph Harding (D) |
| 89th (1965–1967) | Compton I. White Jr. (D) | George V. Hansen (R) |
| 90th (1967–1969) | Jim McClure (R) | George V. Hansen (R) |
| 91st (1969–1971) | Jim McClure (R) | Orval Hansen (R) |
| 92nd (1971–1973) | Jim McClure (R) | Orval Hansen (R) |
| 93rd (1973–1975) | Steve Symms (R) | Orval Hansen (R) |
| 94th (1975–1977) | Steve Symms (R) | George V. Hansen (R) |
| 95th (1977–1979) | Steve Symms (R) | George V. Hansen (R) |
| 96th (1979–1981) | Steve Symms (R) | George V. Hansen (R) |
| 97th (1981–1983) | Larry Craig (R) | George V. Hansen (R) |
| 98th (1983–1985) | Larry Craig (R) | George V. Hansen (R) |
| 99th (1985–1987) | Larry Craig (R) | Richard Stallings (D) |
| 100th (1987–1989) | Larry Craig (R) | Richard Stallings (D) |
| 101st (1989–1991) | Larry Craig (R) | Richard Stallings (D) |
| 102nd (1991–1993) | Larry LaRocco (D) | Richard Stallings (D) |
| 103rd (1993–1995) | Larry LaRocco (D) | Mike Crapo (R) |
| 104th (1995–1997) | Helen Chenoweth (R) | Mike Crapo (R) |
| 105th (1997–1999) | Helen Chenoweth (R) | Mike Crapo (R) |
| 106th (1999–2001) | Helen Chenoweth (R) | Mike Simpson (R) |
| 107th (2001–2003) | Butch Otter (R) | Mike Simpson (R) |
| 108th (2003–2005) | Butch Otter (R) | Mike Simpson (R) |
| 109th (2005–2007) | Butch Otter (R) | Mike Simpson (R) |
| 110th (2007–2009) | Bill Sali (R) | Mike Simpson (R) |
| 111th (2009–2011) | Walt Minnick (D) | Mike Simpson (R) |
| 112th (2011–2013) | Raúl Labrador (R) | Mike Simpson (R) |
| 113th (2013–2015) | Raúl Labrador (R) | Mike Simpson (R) |
| 114th (2015–2017) | Raúl Labrador (R) | Mike Simpson (R) |
| 115th (2017–2019) | Raúl Labrador (R) | Mike Simpson (R) |
| 116th (2019–2021) | Russ Fulcher (R) | Mike Simpson (R) |
| 117th (2021–2023) | Russ Fulcher (R) | Mike Simpson (R) |
| 118th (2023–2025) | Russ Fulcher (R) | Mike Simpson (R) |
| 119th (2025–2027) | Russ Fulcher (R) | Mike Simpson (R) |
| 120th (2027–2029) | Russ Fulcher (R) | Mike Simpson (R) |

== See also ==
- List of United States congressional districts
- Idaho's congressional districts
- Political party strength in Idaho
