= List of United States representatives from Idaho =

The following is an alphabetical list of United States representatives from the state of Idaho. For chronological tables of members of both houses of the United States Congress from the state (through the present day), see Idaho's congressional delegations. It includes members who have represented both the state and the territory, both past and present.

== Current members ==
As of the election of 2024.

- 1st district: Russ Fulcher (R) (since 2019)
- 2nd district: Mike Simpson (R) (since 1999)

== List of members and delegates ==
| Member/Delegate | Years | Party | District | Electoral history |
|---|---|---|---|---|
| George Ainslie | March 4, 1879 – March 3, 1883 | Democratic | Territory | Elected in 1878. Lost re-election to Singiser. |
| Thomas W. Bennett | March 4, 1875 – June 23, 1876 | Independent | Territory | Elected in 1874. Lost election contest to Fenn. |
| Hamer H. Budge | January 3, 1951 – January 3, 1961 | Republican | 2nd | Elected in 1950. Lost re-election to Harding. |
| Helen Chenoweth-Hage | January 3, 1995 – January 3, 2001 | Republican | 1st | Elected in 1994. Retired. |
| D. Worth Clark | January 3, 1935 – January 3, 1939 | Democratic | 2nd | Elected in 1934. Retired to run for U.S. senator. |
| Thomas C. Coffin | March 4, 1933 – June 6, 1934 | Democratic | 2nd | Elected in 1932. Died. |
| Larry Craig | January 3, 1981 – January 3, 1991 | Republican | 1st | Elected in 1980. Retired to run for U.S. senator. |
| Mike Crapo | January 3, 1993 – January 3, 1999 | Republican | 2nd | Elected in 1992. Retired to run for U.S. senator. |
| Fred Dubois | March 4, 1887 – July 3, 1890 | Republican | Territory | Elected in 1886. Position eliminated upon statehood. |
| Henry Dworshak | January 3, 1939 – November 5, 1946 | Republican | 2nd | Elected in 1938. Resigned when elected U.S. senator. |
| Stephen S. Fenn | June 23, 1876 – March 3, 1879 | Democratic | Territory | Won contested election. Retired. |
| Burton L. French | March 4, 1903 – March 3, 1909 | Republican | At-large | Elected in 1902. Lost renomination to Hamer. |
| Burton L. French | March 4, 1911 – March 3, 1915 | Republican | At-large | Elected again in 1910. Retired to run for U.S. senator. |
| Burton L. French | March 4, 1917 – March 3, 1919 | Republican | At-large | Elected in 1916. Redistricted to the 1st district. |
| Burton L. French | March 4, 1919 – March 3, 1933 | Republican | 1st | Redistricted from the at-large district and re-elected in 1918. Lost re-election to White. |
| Russ Fulcher | January 3, 2019 – present | Republican | 1st | Elected in 2018. Incumbent |
| Thomas L. Glenn | March 4, 1901 – March 3, 1903 | Populist | At-large | Elected in 1900. Retired. |
| Abe Goff | January 3, 1947 – January 3, 1949 | Republican | 1st | Elected in 1946. Lost re-election to White. |
| James Gunn | March 4, 1897 – March 3, 1899 | Populist | At-large | Elected in 1896. Lost re-election to Wilson. |
| John Hailey | March 4, 1873 – March 3, 1875 | Democratic | Territory | Elected in 1872. Retired. |
| John Hailey | March 4, 1885 – March 3, 1887 | Democratic | Territory | Elected in 1884. Lost re-election to Dubois. |
| Thomas Ray Hamer | March 4, 1909 – March 3, 1911 | Republican | At-large | Elected in 1908. Lost renomination to French. |
| George V. Hansen | January 3, 1965 – January 3, 1969 | Republican | 2nd | Elected in 1964. Retired to run for U.S. Senator. |
| George V. Hansen | January 3, 1975 – January 3, 1985 | Republican | 2nd | Elected in 1974. Lost re-election to Stallings. |
| Orval Hansen | January 3, 1969 – January 3, 1975 | Republican | 2nd | Elected in 1968. Lost renomination to G. Hansen. |
| Ralph Harding | January 3, 1961 – January 3, 1965 | Democratic | 2nd | Elected in 1960. Lost re-election to G. Hansen. |
| Edward D. Holbrook | March 4, 1865 – March 3, 1869 | Democratic | Territory | Elected in 1864. Retired. |
| Raúl Labrador | January 3, 2011 – January 3, 2019 | Republican | 1st | Elected in 2010. Retired to run for Governor of Idaho. |
| Larry LaRocco | January 3, 1991 – January 3, 1995 | Democratic | 1st | Elected in 1990. Lost re-election to Chenoweth-Hage. |
| Jim McClure | January 3, 1967 – January 3, 1973 | Republican | 1st | Elected in 1966. Retired to run for U.S. senator. |
| Robert M. McCracken | March 4, 1915 – March 3, 1917 | Republican | At-large | Elected in 1914. Lost renomination to French. |
| Samuel A. Merritt | March 4, 1871 – March 3, 1873 | Democratic | Territory | Elected in 1870. Lost renomination to Hailey. |
| Walt Minnick | January 3, 2009 – January 3, 2011 | Democratic | 1st | Elected in 2008. Lost re-election to Labrador. |
| Butch Otter | January 3, 2001 – January 3, 2007 | Republican | 1st | Elected in 2000. Retired to run for Governor of Idaho. |
| Gracie Pfost | January 3, 1953 – January 3, 1963 | Democratic | 1st | Elected in 1952. Retired to run for U.S. senator. |
| Bill Sali | January 3, 2007 – January 3, 2009 | Republican | 1st | Elected in 2006. Lost re-election to Minnick. |
| John C. Sanborn | January 3, 1947 – January 3, 1951 | Republican | 2nd | Elected in 1946. Retired to run for U.S. senator. |
| Jacob K. Shafer | March 4, 1869 – March 3, 1871 | Democratic | Territory | Elected in 1868. Lost renomination to Merritt. |
| Mike Simpson | January 3, 1999 – present | Republican | 2nd | Elected in 1998. Incumbent |
| Theodore F. Singiser | March 4, 1883 – March 3, 1885 | Republican | Territory | Elected in 1882. Lost re-election to Hailey. |
| Addison T. Smith | March 4, 1913 – March 3, 1919 | Republican | At-large | Elected in 1912. Redistricted to the 2nd district. |
| Addison T. Smith | March 4, 1919 – March 3, 1933 | Republican | 2nd | Redistricted from the at-large district and re-elected in 1918. Lost re-election to Coffin. |
| Richard Stallings | January 3, 1985 – January 3, 1993 | Democratic | 2nd | Elected in 1984. Retired to run for U.S. senator. |
| Willis Sweet | October 1, 1890 – March 3, 1895 | Republican | At-large | Elected in 1890 and took seat upon statehood. Retired. |
| Steve Symms | January 3, 1973 – January 3, 1981 | Republican | 1st | Elected in 1972. Retired to run for U.S. senator. |
| William H. Wallace | February 1, 1864 – March 3, 1865 | Republican | Territory | Elected in 1863 in anticipation of territorial status. Retired. |
| Compton I. White | March 4, 1933 – January 3, 1947 | Democratic | 1st | Elected in 1932. Lost re-election to Goff. |
| Compton I. White | January 3, 1949 – January 3, 1951 | Democratic | 1st | Elected in 1948. Retired to run for U.S. senator. |
| Compton I. White Jr. | January 3, 1963 – January 3, 1967 | Democratic | 1st | Elected in 1962. Lost re-election to McClure. |
| Edgar Wilson | March 4, 1895 – March 3, 1897 | Republican | At-large | Elected in 1894. Retired to run for Idaho Supreme Court. |
| Edgar Wilson | March 4, 1899 – March 3, 1901 | Silver Republican | At-large | Elected in 1898. Retired. |
| John T. Wood | January 3, 1951 – January 3, 1953 | Republican | 1st | Elected in 1950. Lost re-election to Pfost. |

== Key ==
Key to party colors and abbreviations for members of the U.S. Congress and other politicians or officials
| Alaskan Independence (AKIP) Know Nothing (KN) American Labor (AL) Anti-Jacksonian (Anti-J); National Republican (NR) Anti-Administration (AA) Anti-Masonic (Anti-M) Conservative (Con) Covenant (Cov) | Democratic (D) Democratic–Farmer–Labor (DFL) Democratic–NPL (D-NPL) Dixiecrat (Dix), States' Rights (SR) Democratic-Republican (DR) Farmer–Labor (FL) Federalist (F); Pro-Administration (PA) | Free Soil (FS) Fusion (Fus) Greenback (GB) Independence (IPM) Jacksonian (J) Liberal (Lib) Libertarian (L) National Union (NU) | Nonpartisan League (NPL) Nullifier (N) Opposition Northern (O); Opposition Southern (O) Populist (Pop) Progressive (Prog) Prohibition (Proh) Readjuster (Rea) | Republican (R) Silver (Sv) Silver Republican (SvR) Socialist (Soc) Union (U) Unconditional Union (UU) Vermont Progressive (VP) Whig (W) | Independent (I) Nonpartisan (NP) |

== See also ==
- Idaho's congressional delegations
- Idaho's congressional districts
- List of United States senators from Idaho
