= Third-party and independent members of the United States Congress =

Third-party and independent members of the United States Congress are generally rare. Although the Republican and Democratic parties have dominated U.S. politics in a two-party system since 1856, some independents and members of other political parties have also been elected to the House of Representatives or United States Senate, or changed their party affiliation during their term.

== Senate ==
Image	Senator	State	Term	Notes
	Angus King	Maine	2013–present	Elected as an independent; caucuses with the Democrats
	Bernie Sanders	Vermont	2007–present	Elected as an independent; caucuses with the Democrats; Democratic Party member from 2015–2016 and 2019–2020 while running for President
	Joe Manchin	West Virginia	2010–2025	Elected as a Democrat, switched to independent in 2024
	Kyrsten Sinema	Arizona	2019–2025	Elected as a Democrat, switched to independent in 2022
	Joe Lieberman	Connecticut	1989–2013	Re-elected on the Connecticut for Lieberman ticket after losing the 2006 Democratic nomination
	Dean Barkley	Minnesota	2002–2003	Appointed for Independence Party of Minnesota
	Jim Jeffords	Vermont	1989–2007	Switched from Republican to independent in 2001
	Bob Smith	New Hampshire	1990–2003	Switched from Republican to independent in 1999 but switched back to Republican in 2000
	James L. Buckley	New York	1971–1977	Elected as a Conservative, lost re-election as a Republican in 1976
	Harry F. Byrd Jr.	Virginia	1965–1983	Switched from Democratic to independent in 1970
	Wayne Morse	Oregon	1945–1969	Switched from Republican to independent in 1953, then to Democratic in 1955
	John E. Miller	Arkansas	1937–1941	Elected as an independent, served as Democratic
	Ernest Lundeen	Minnesota	1937–1940	Elected as Farmer-Labor
	George W. Norris	Nebraska	1913–1943	Switched from Republican to independent in 1936
	Elmer Austin Benson	Minnesota	1935–1936	Elected as Farmer-Labor
	Robert M. La Follette Jr.	Wisconsin	1925–1947	Switched from Republican to Progressive in 1934, then back to Republican in 1946
	Magnus Johnson	Minnesota	1923–1925	Elected as Farmer-Labor
	Henrik Shipstead	Minnesota	1923–1947	Elected as Farmer-Labor, switched to Republican in 1940
	Miles Poindexter	Washington	1911–1923	Switched from Republican to Progressive in 1912, switched back to Republican in 1915
	Joseph M. Dixon	Montana	1907–1913	Switched from Republican to Progressive in 1912
	Henry Heitfeld	Idaho	1897–1903	Elected as a Populist
	William Alexander Harris	Kansas	1897–1903	Elected as a Populist
	Henry Moore Teller	Colorado	1876–1909	Switched from Republican to Silver Republican in 1896, then to Democratic in 1903
	Fred Dubois	Idaho	1891–1897	Switched from Republican to Silver Republican in 1896
	Frank J. Cannon	Utah	1896–1899	Switched from Republican to Silver Republican in 1896
	Richard F. Pettigrew	South Dakota	1889–1901	Switched from Republican to Silver Republican in 1896
	Lee Mantle	Montana	1895–1899	Switched from Republican to Silver Republican in 1896
	John P. Jones	Nevada	1873–1903	Switched from Republican to Silver in 1895, then back to Republican in 1901
	William Morris Stewart	Nevada	1887–1905	Switched from Republican to Silver in 1893, then back to Republican in 1901
	William V. Allen	Nebraska	1893–1901	Elected as a Populist
	James H. Kyle	South Dakota	1891–1901	Elected as a Populist
	Marion Butler	North Carolina	1895–1901	Elected as a Populist
	William A. Peffer	Kansas	1891–1897	Elected as a Populist
	Harrison H. Riddleberger	Virginia	1883–1889	Elected as a Readjuster
	William Mahone	Virginia	1881–1887	Elected as a Readjuster
	David Davis	Illinois	1877–1883	Elected as an independent
	Newton Booth	California	1875–1881	Elected as an Anti-Monopolist, served as an Independent Republican
	Orris S. Ferry	Connecticut	1867–1875	Elected as a Liberal Republican in 1872
	Morgan C. Hamilton	Texas	1870–1877	Switched from Republican to Liberal Republican in 1872, switched back to Republican in 1875
	Charles Sumner	Massachusetts	1851–1874	Elected as Free Soil Democratic in 1851, became a Republican in 1855, then became a Liberal Republican in 1872
	David T. Patterson	Tennessee	1866–1869	Elected as a Unionist in 1866, became a Republican by 1867
	Joseph S. Fowler	Tennessee	1866–1871	Elected as an Unconditional Unionist in 1866, became a Republican by 1867
	John Creswell	Maryland	1865–1867	Elected as an Unconditional Unionist in 1864
	Benjamin Gratz Brown	Missouri	1863–1867	Elected as a Union Emancipationist in 1863, became a Radical Unionist (Republican) by 1865
	Peter G. Van Winkle	West Virginia	1863–1869	Elected as a Unionist in 1863, became a Republican by 1867
	Reverdy Johnson	Maryland	1863–1868	Elected as a Unionist in 1863, switched to Democratic by 1865
	Lemuel J. Bowden	Virginia	1863–1864	Elected as a Unionist in 1863
	Thomas Holliday Hicks	Maryland	1862–1865	Elected as an Unconditional Unionist in 1862
	Robert Wilson	Missouri	1862–1863	Appointed as a Unionist in 1862
	John B. Henderson	Missouri	1862–1869	Elected as a Unionist in 1862, became a Republican by 1865
	Garrett Davis	Kentucky	1861–1872	Elected as a Union Democrat in 1861, switched to Democratic by 1867
	John S. Carlile	Virginia	1861–1865	Elected as a Unionist in 1861
	Waitman T. Willey	Virginia	1861–1863	Elected as a Unionist in 1861

== House of Representatives ==
Image	Representative	District	Term	Notes
	Kevin Kiley	California 3rd	2023–present	First elected as a Republican, switched to independent in 2026
	Paul Mitchell	Michigan 10th	2017–2021	First elected as a Republican, switched to independent in 2020
	Justin Amash	Michigan 3rd	2011–2021	First elected as a Republican, switched to independent in 2019 and then to Libertarian in 2020
	Virgil Goode	Virginia 5th	1997–2009	Switched from Democratic to independent in 2000, then to Republican in 2002
	Jo Ann Emerson	Missouri 8th	1996–2013	First elected as a Republican, re-elected as an independent due to state law, then rejoined Republicans in early 1997
	Bernie Sanders	Vermont at-large	1991–2007	Elected as an independent
	William Carney	New York 1st	1979–1987	Elected as a Conservative and later sat with Republicans, switched to Republican in 1985
	Frazier Reams	Ohio 9th	1951–1955	Elected as an independent
	Franklin Delano Roosevelt Jr.	New York 20th	1949–1955	Elected as a Liberal, re-elected as Democratic
	Leo Isacson	New York 24th	1948–1949	Elected from the American Labor Party ticket
	Harold Hagen	Minnesota 9th	1943–1955	Elected as a member of the Minnesota Farmer–Labor Party in 1942
	John Bernard	Minnesota 8th	1937–1939	Elected as a member of the Minnesota Farmer–Labor Party in 1936
	Dewey Johnson	Minnesota 5th	1937–1939	Elected as a member of the Minnesota Farmer–Labor Party in 1936
	Franck R. Havenner	California 4th	1937–1941, 1945–1953	Elected as a Progressive, re-elected as Democratic
	Henry Teigan	Minnesota 3rd	1937–1939	Elected as a member of the Minnesota Farmer–Labor Party in 1936
	Thomas Ryum Amlie	Wisconsin 1st	1935–1939	Elected as a Progressive
	Gerald J. Boileau	Wisconsin 7th	1935–1939	Elected as a Progressive
	Rich T. Buckler	Minnesota 9th	1935–1943	Elected as a member of the Minnesota Farmer–Labor Party in 1934
	Bernard J. Gehrmann	Wisconsin 10th	1935–1943	Elected as a Progressive
	Harry Sauthoff	Wisconsin 2nd	1935–1945	Elected as a Progressive
	George J. Schneider	Wisconsin 8th	1935–1939	Elected as a Progressive
	Merlin Hull	Wisconsin 9th	1935–1944	Elected as a Progressive
	Vito Marcantonio	New York 20th	1935–1937, 1939–1945	Elected from the American Labor Party ticket in 1938
	Gardner R. Withrow	Wisconsin 3rd	1935–1939	Elected as a Progressive
	Henry M. Arens	Minnesota at-large	1933–1935	Elected as a member of the Minnesota Farmer–Labor Party in 1932
	Magnus Johnson	Minnesota at-large	1933–1935	Elected as a member of the Minnesota Farmer–Labor Party in 1932
	Ernest Lundeen	Minnesota 5th, Minnesota at-large, Minnesota 3rd	1933–1937	Elected as a member of the Minnesota Farmer–Labor Party in 1932
	Francis Shoemaker	Minnesota at-large	1933–1935	Elected as a member of the Minnesota Farmer–Labor Party in 1932
	Paul John Kvale	Minnesota 7th, Minnesota at-large	1929–1939	Elected as a member of the Minnesota Farmer–Labor Party in 1928
	Knud Wefald	Minnesota 9th	1923–1927	Elected as a member of the Minnesota Farmer–Labor Party in 1922
	Ole J. Kvale	Minnesota 7th	1923–1929	Elected as a member of the Minnesota Farmer–Labor Party in 1922
	William Leighton Carss	Minnesota 8th	1919–1929	Elected as a member of the Minnesota Farmer–Labor Party in 1918
	Fiorello La Guardia	New York 14th, New York 20th	1917–1919, 1923–1933	Re-elected as a Socialist in 1924, ran as a Republican in all other elections
	John A. Elston	California 6th	1915–1921	Elected as a Progressive in 1915
	Meyer London	New York 12th	1915–1923	Elected as a Socialist
	Whitmell P. Martin	Louisiana 3rd	1915–1929	Elected as a Progressive in 1914 and 1916, ran as a Democrat after that
	Thomas D. Schall	Minnesota 10th	1915–1925	Elected as a Progressive in 1914 and 1916, ran as a Republican after that
	Charles Hiram Randall	California 9th	1915–1921	Elected as a Prohibitionist
	Walter M. Chandler	New York 19th	1913–1919 1921–1923	Elected as a Progressive in 1912 and 1914, ran as a Republican after that
	James W. Bryan	Washington at-large	1913–1915	Elected as a Progressive in 1912
	Jacob Falconer	Washington at-large	1913–1915	Elected as a Progressive in 1912
	William H. Hinebaugh	Illinois 12th	1913–1915	Elected as a Progressive in 1912
	Willis James Hulings	Pennsylvania 28th	1913–1915	Elected as a Progressive in 1912
	William Josiah MacDonald	Michigan 12th	1913–1915	Elected as a Progressive in 1912
	Milton William Shreve	Pennsylvania 25th	1913–1915, 1919–1933	Re-elected as an Independent Republican in 1920
	Henry Wilson Temple	Pennsylvania 24th	1913–1915	Elected as a Progressive in 1912
	Charles M. Thomson	Illinois 10th	1913–1915	Elected as a Progressive in 1912
	William Stephens	California 10th	1911–1917	Elected as Republican in 1910, re-elected as a Progressive
	Roy O. Woodruff	Michigan 10th	1913–1915 1921–1953	Elected as a Progressive in 1912, re-elected as a Republican in 1920
	Bill Kent	California 1st	1911–1917	Elected as a Republican in 1910, re-elected as an Independent
	Ira C. Copley	Illinois 11th	1911–1923	Re-elected as a Progressive in 1924, ran as a Republican in all other elections
	Victor L. Berger	Wisconsin 5th	1911–1913 1923–1929	Elected as a Socialist
	Peter A. Porter	New York 34th	1907–1909	Elected as an Independent Republican
	Caldwell Edwards	Montana at-large	1901–1903	Elected as a Populist
	Thomas L. Glenn	Idaho at-large	1901–1903	Elected as a Populist
	John Wilbur Atwater	North Carolina 4th	1899–1901	Elected as a Populist
	William Neville	Nebraska 6th	1899–1903	Elected as a Populist
	Edgar Wilson	Idaho at-large	1895–1897 1899–1901	Elected as a Republican in 1894, re-elected as a Silver Republican
	Charles A. Barlow	California 6th	1897–1899	Elected as a Populist
	Jeremiah D. Botkin	Kansas at-large	1897–1899	Elected as a Populist
	Curtis H. Castle	California 7th	1897–1899	Elected as a Populist
	John Edgar Fowler	North Carolina 3rd	1897–1899	Elected as a Populist
	William Laury Greene	Nebraska 6th	1897–1899	Elected as a Populist
	James Gunn	Idaho at-large	1897–1899	Elected as a Populist
	William Carey Jones	Washington at-large	1897–1899	Elected as a Silver Republican
	John Edward Kelley	South Dakota at-large	1897–1899	Elected as a Populist
	Freeman Knowles	South Dakota at-large	1897–1899	Elected as a Populist
	Charles Martin	North Carolina 6th	1896–1899	Elected as a Populist
	Samuel Maxwell	Nebraska 3rd	1897–1899	Elected as a Populist
	Nelson B. McCormick	Kansas 6th	1897–1899	Elected as a Populist
	Mason S. Peters	Kansas 2nd	1897–1899	Elected as a Populist
	Edwin R. Ridgely	Kansas 3rd	1897–1901	Elected as a Populist
	William Ledyard Stark	Nebraska 4th	1897–1903	Elected as a Populist
	Roderick Dhu Sutherland	Nebraska 5th	1897–1901	Elected as a Populist
	William D. Vincent	Kansas 5th	1897–1899	Elected as a Populist
	Albert Taylor Goodwyn	Alabama 5th	1896–1897	Elected as a Populist
	John F. Shafroth	Colorado 1st	1895–1904	Switched from Republican to Silver Republican in 1897
	Milford W. Howard	Alabama 7th	1895–1899	Elected as a Populist in 1894
	Harry Skinner	North Carolina 1st	1895–1899	Elected as a Populist
	William Franklin Strowd	North Carolina 4th	1895–1899	Elected as a Populist
	John Calhoun Bell	Colorado 2nd	1893–1903	Elected as a Populist
	Marion Cannon	California 6th	1893–1895	Elected as a Populist
	Lafe Pence	Colorado 1st	1893–1895	Elected as a Populist
	Alonzo C. Shuford	North Carolina 7th	1893–1899	Elected as a Populist
	Thomas Jefferson Hudson	Kansas 3rd	1893–1895	Elected as a Populist
	Haldor Boen	Minnesota 7th	1893–1895	Elected as a Populist
	Bill Harris	Kansas at-large	1893–1895	Elected as a Populist
	Bill Baker	Kansas 6th	1891–1897	Elected as a Populist
	Benjamin H. Clover	Kansas 3rd	1891–1893	Elected as a Populist
	John Davis	Kansas 5th	1891–1895	Elected as a Populist
	Kittel Halvorson	Minnesota 5th	1891–1893	Elected as a Populist
	Omer Madison Kem	Nebraska 3rd	1891–1897	Elected as a Populist
	William A. McKeighan	Nebraska 2nd	1891–1895	Elected as a Populist
	John G. Otis	Kansas 4th	1891–1893	Elected as a Populist
	Jerry Simpson	Kansas 7th	1891–1895	Elected as a Populist
	Thomas E. Watson	Georgia 10th	1891–1893	Elected as a Populist
	Lewis P. Featherstone	Arkansas 1st	1889–1891	Elected as a member of the Labor Party
	Samuel I. Hopkins	Virginia 6th	1887–1889	Elected as a member of the Labor Party
	John Nichols	North Carolina 4th	1887–1889	Elected as an independent
	Henry Smith	Wisconsin 4th	1887–1889	Elected as a member of the Labor Party
	Benjamin F. Shively	Indiana 13th	1884–1885	Elected as an Anti-Monopolist
	Henry Bowen	Virginia 9th	1883–1885	Elected as a Readjuster in 1882; later a Republican
	James Ronald Chalmers	Mississippi 6th	1883–1885	Elected as an independent
	Benjamin S. Hooper	Virginia 4th	1883–1885	Elected as a Readjuster
	Harry Libbey	Virginia 2nd	1883–1887	Elected as a Readjuster in 1882; re-elected as a Republican
	Ted Lyman	Massachusetts 9th	1883–1885	Elected as an Independent Republican
	Robert Murphy Mayo	Virginia 1st	1883–1884	Elected as a Readjuster
	Thomas P. Ochiltree	Texas 7th	1883–1885	Elected as an independent
	Luman Hamlin Weller	Iowa 4th	1883–1885	Elected as a member of the United States Greenback Party in 1882
	John Sergeant Wise	Virginia At-large	1883–1885	Elected as a Readjuster
	Charles N. Brumm	Pennsylvania 13th	1881–1909	Elected as a member of the United States Greenback Party in 1880
	Joseph Henry Burrows	Missouri 10th	1881–1883	Elected as a member of the United States Greenback Party in 1880
	Abram Fulkerson	Virginia 9th	1881–1883	Elected as a Readjuster Democrat in 1880
	Ira S. Haseltine	Missouri 6th	1881–1883	Elected as a member of the United States Greenback Party in 1880
	James Mosgrove	Pennsylvania 25th	1881–1883	Elected as a member of the United States Greenback Party in 1880
	John Paul	Virginia 7th	1881–Sept. 1883	Elected as a Readjuster Democrat in 1880; re-elected as a Readjuster in 1882; resigned to accept a judicial appointment
	Theron Moses Rice	Missouri 7th	1881–1883	Elected as a member of the United States Greenback Party in 1880
	J. Hyatt Smith	New York 3rd	1881–1883	Elected as an independent
	Bradley Barlow	Vermont 3rd	1879–1881	Elected as a member of the United States Greenback Party in 1878
	Nicholas Ford	Missouri 9th	1879–1883	Elected as a member of the United States Greenback Party in 1878
	Albert P. Forsythe	Illinois 15th	1879–1881	Elected as a member of the United States Greenback Party in 1878
	Edward H. Gillette	Iowa 7th	1879–1881	Elected as a member of the United States Greenback Party in 1878
	George Jones	Texas 5th	1879–1883	Elected as a member of the United States Greenback Party
	George W. Ladd	Maine 4th	1879–1883	Elected as a member of the United States Greenback Party
	William M. Lowe	Alabama 8th	1879–1882	Elected as a member of the United States Greenback Party in 1878
	Gilbert De La Matyr	Indiana 7th	1879–1881	Elected as a member of the United States Greenback Party in 1878
	Thompson H. Murch	Maine 5th	1879–1883	Elected as a member of the United States Greenback Party
	James O'Brien	New York 10th	1879–1881	Elected as an independent (anti-Tammany) Democrat
	Daniel O'Reilly	New York 2nd	1879–1881	Elected as an independent Democrat
	Henry Persons	Georgia 4th	1879–1881	Elected as an independent Democrat
	Daniel Lindsay Russell	North Carolina 3rd	1879–1881	Elected as a member of the United States Greenback Party
	Samuel L. Sawyer	Missouri 8th	1879–1881	Elected as an independent Democrat
	Emory Speer	Georgia 9th	1879–1883	Elected as an independent Democrat
	Oscar Turner	Kentucky 1st	1879–1885	Elected as an independent Democrat in 1878; re-elected as a Democrat in 1880; re-elected as an independent Democrat in 1882
	James Weaver	Iowa 6th	1879–1889	Elected as a member of the United States Greenback Party in 1878
	Hendrick Bradley Wright	Pennsylvania 12th	1879–1881	Elected as a member of the United States Greenback Party in 1878
	Seth Hartman Yocum	Pennsylvania 20th	1879–1881	Elected as a member of the United States Greenback Party in 1878
	William B. Anderson	Illinois 19th	1875–1877	Elected as an independent in 1874
	Nathaniel P. Banks	Massachusetts 5th	1875–1879	Elected as an independent in 1874, re-elected as a Republican in 1876
	Alexander Campbell	Illinois 7th	1875–1877	Elected as an independent in 1874
	Dudley Chase Denison	Vermont 2nd	1875–1881	Elected as an independent Republican in 1874, re-elected as a Republican in 1876
	William Harrell Felton	Georgia 7th	1875–1879	Elected as an independent Democrat in 1874
	Julius Hawley Seelye	Massachusetts 10th	1875–1877	Elected as an independent in 1874
	Guilford Wiley Wells	Mississippi 2nd	1875–1877	Elected as an independent Republican in 1874
	Simeon B. Chittenden	New York 3rd	1874–1881	Elected as an independent Republican to a vacant seat in 1874, re-elected as a Republican in 1876
	George A. Sheridan	Louisiana at-large	1875	Ran as a Liberal Republican in 1872, adjudged to have won a contested election and seated at the end of the 43rd Congress
	Henry B. Banning	Ohio 2nd	1873–1879	Elected as a Liberal Republican in 1872, re-elected as a Democrat in 1874
	Frederick G. Bromberg	Alabama 1st	1873–1875	Elected as a Liberal Republican in 1872
	William Joseph Hynes	Arkansas at-large	1873–1875	Elected as a Liberal Republican in 1872
	John James Davis	West Virginia 1st	1871–1875	Elected as a Democrat in 1870, re-elected as an independent Democrat in 1872
	James G. Blair	Missouri 8th	1871–1873	Elected as a Liberal Republican in 1870
	John V. Creely	Pennsylvania 2nd	1871–1873	Elected as an independent Republican in 1870
	Gustavus Finkelnburg	Missouri 2nd	1869–1873	Elected as a Republican (Radical Unionist) in 1868, re-elected as a Liberal Republican in 1870
	Richard T. W. Duke	Virginia 5th	1870 (Nov.)–1873	Elected as a Virginia Conservative in an 1870 special election
	George Booker	Virginia 4th	1870–1871	Elected as a Virginia Conservative in 1869
	James K. Gibson	Virginia 8th	1870–1871	Elected as a Virginia Conservative in 1869
	Lewis McKenzie	Virginia 7th	1870–1871	Elected as a Virginia Conservative in 1869
	William Milnes Jr.	Virginia 6th	1870–1871	Elected as a Virginia Conservative in 1869
	Robert Ridgway	Virginia 5th	1870 (Jan.–Oct.)	Elected as a Virginia Conservative in 1869 (died in office)
