= Robert E. Lee Campground =

Campground in Boise National Forest

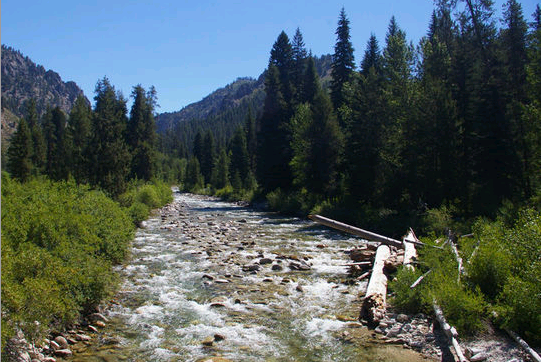
- North Fork Boise River at Deer Park Cabin near Robert E. Lee Campground

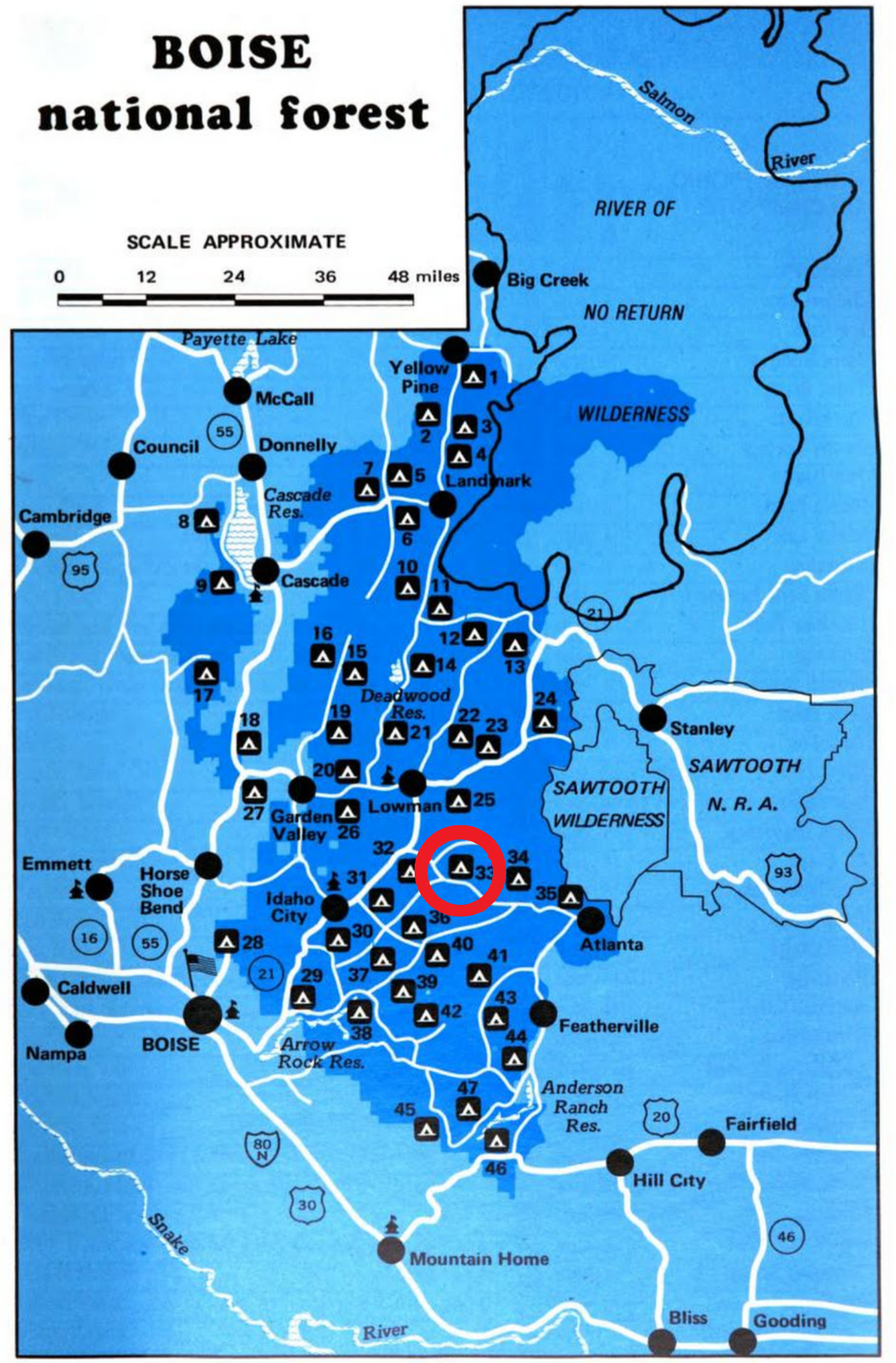
- Boise National Forest map with Robert E. Lee Campground highlighted
- Location: Boise, Idaho, United States
- Coordinates: 43°54′20″N 115°26′04″W
- Elevation: 4,800 ft (1,500 m)

Robert E. Lee Campground is a United States Forest Service campground in the Boise National Forest about 40 miles (64 km) east of the Idaho state capital, Boise. It is situated at North Fork Boise River river mile 19, at the confluence of Robert E. Lee Creek, a short tributary. The campground and creek, both named for General Robert E. Lee, are the only two Confederate memorials in the U.S. state of Idaho. It is at 4,800 feet (1,500 m) in elevation and has six campsites.

== Existence ==
The existence of the campsite was often in dispute. It is likely that Lee never camped there due to the fact that Idaho Territory was loyal to the Union in the American Civil War. It is believed to have been named by Confederate immigrants to the territory shortly after the end of the war. The Boise National Forest's United States Forest Service stated in the 2020s that no such campground existed in their records. This was contradicted by older Forest Service maps from the 1980s showing the Robert E. Lee Campground near the north fork of the Boise River and older resource management plans that said it needed further management. It is believed that due to funding shortfalls in the 1990s, the US Forest Service decommissioned it and stopped maintaining it. The 1980s map listed that the campground contained tables and outhouses, though these were no longer present at the campsite in 2020. Campers had built their own campfire rings on the site in lieu of other amenities.

In 2020, following the Cathedral of the Rockies removing a stained glass window dedicated to Robert E. Lee, consideration was made to rename the Robert E. Lee Campground. A local resident recommended it be renamed after Les Purce, the first black publicly elected official in Idaho.
