= Thomas Hamer =

Thomas Hamer may refer to:

- Thomas L. Hamer (1800–1846), United States congressman and soldier
- Thomas R. Hamer (1864–1950), United States representative from Idaho
- Thomas Hamer (swimmer) (born 1998), British swimmer
- Tom Hamer (born 1999), English footballer for Lincoln City
