= Kathleen M. Murray =

American academic administrator and piano professor

21st President of Hamline University
- Interim
- In office July 1, 2024 – July 1, 2025; Acting: January 1, 2023 – June 30, 2023
- Preceded by: Fayneese Miller
- Succeeded by: Mayme Hostetter

14th President of Whitman College
- In office 2015–2022
- Preceded by: George Sumner Bridges
- Succeeded by: Sarah Bolton

Personal details
- Education: Illinois Wesleyan University; Bowling Green State University; Northwestern University

Kathleen M. Murray is an American academic administrator and piano professor. She was the 14th president of Whitman College for seven years, acting president of Macalester College for three months, and acting/interim president of Hamline University for one year. She previously served as the provost and dean of faculty at Macalester.

== Life ==
Murray completed a Bachelor of Music at the Illinois Wesleyan University. She earned a Master of Music from Bowling Green State University. Murray completed a Doctor of Music at Northwestern University where she studied piano performance and pedagogy. Her 1989 dissertation was titled, A Piano Pedagogy Internship Model.

Murray was a piano professor for almost twenty years at Lawrence University. She joined Birmingham–Southern College as its provost. For seven years, Murray served in various roles at Macalester College, including as the provost, dean of faculty, and a professor of music. She was its acting president for three months in 2013 while the president was on a sabbatical. In 2015, she became the 14th president of Whitman College. She was the first woman to serve in the role. She retired in 2022. On November 1, 2023, Murray was named as the 21st president of Hamline University, succeeding Fayneese Miller. Murray is set to begin as the acting president when Miller goes on sabbatical on January 1 and retires on June 30, 2024.
