= United States congressional delegations =

Each U.S. state sends a delegation to each house of the United States Congress: One to the House of Representatives and one to the Senate. Prior to the passage of the Seventeenth Amendment to the United States Constitution, senators were selected by state legislatures, but now senators are elected by popular vote along with House representatives. United States congressional delegations include:

- Alabama's congressional delegations
- Alaska's congressional delegations
- Arizona's congressional delegations
- Arkansas's congressional delegations
- California's congressional delegations
- Colorado's congressional delegations
- Connecticut's congressional delegations
- Delaware's congressional delegations
- Florida's congressional delegations
- Georgia's congressional delegations
- Hawaii's congressional delegations
- Idaho's congressional delegations
- Illinois's congressional delegations
- Indiana's congressional delegations
- Iowa's congressional delegations
- Kansas's congressional delegations
- Kentucky's congressional delegations
- Louisiana's congressional delegations
- Maine's congressional delegations
- Maryland's congressional delegations
- Massachusetts's congressional delegations
- Michigan's congressional delegations
- Minnesota's congressional delegations
- Mississippi's congressional delegations
- Missouri's congressional delegations
- Montana's congressional delegations
- Nebraska's congressional delegations
- Nevada's congressional delegations
- New Hampshire's congressional delegations
- New Jersey's congressional delegations
- New Mexico's congressional delegations
- New York's congressional delegations
- North Carolina's congressional delegations
- North Dakota's congressional delegations
- Ohio's congressional delegations
- Oklahoma's congressional delegations
- Oregon's congressional delegations
- Pennsylvania's congressional delegations
- Rhode Island's congressional delegations
- South Carolina's congressional delegations
- South Dakota's congressional delegations
- Tennessee's congressional delegations
- Texas's congressional delegations
- Utah's congressional delegations
- Vermont's congressional delegations
- Virginia's congressional delegations
- Washington's congressional delegations
- West Virginia's congressional delegations
- Wisconsin's congressional delegations
- Wyoming's congressional delegations
