= List of mayors of Pocatello, Idaho =

The following is a list of mayors of the city of Pocatello, Idaho, United States.

- Edward Stein, c.1893
- A. B. Bean, c.1894
- Joseph B. Bistline, c.1895, c.1899
- W.F. Kasiska, c.1897
- William T. Reeves, c.1897–1898
- M.D. Rice, c.1900
- Theodore Turner, c.1901, 1913–1915
- Oscar B. Steeley, c.1902–1903
- Dan Swinehart, c.1904
- Walter H. Cleare, c.1905–1907
- C.E.M. Loux, c.1907
- D.W. Church, c.1909
- John M. Bistline, c.1911
- Arthur B. Bean, c.1918–1919
- William P. Whitaker, c.1919–1920
- C. Ben Ross, 1922–1930
- Ivan Gasser, c.1931
- Thomas C. Coffin, c.1931–1933
- Elmer Smith, c.1933
- Charles A. Brown, c.1933–1935
- Robert M. Terrell, c.1935–1941
- C. D. 'Dinty' Moore, c.1943–1947
- George R. Phillips, c.1947
- William W. Halsey, c.1949–1951
- W. B. Webb, c.1953
- Earl Pond, c.1962–1966
- Bill Roskelley, c.1973–1974
- Chuck Billmeyer, c.1974–1975
- Les Purce, 1976–1977
- Donna Boe, c.1977–1978
- John P. Evans, c.1980-1983
- Dean Funk, c.1984–1985
- Dick Finlayson, c.1986–1989
- Peter Angstadt, c.1990–1993
- Greg Anderson, c.1998–2001
- Roger Chase, c.2002–2009
- Brian C. Blad, 2010–2025
- Mark Dahlquist, 2026–present

== See also ==
- Pocatello history
