= Stephen S. Fenn =

American politician (1820–1892)

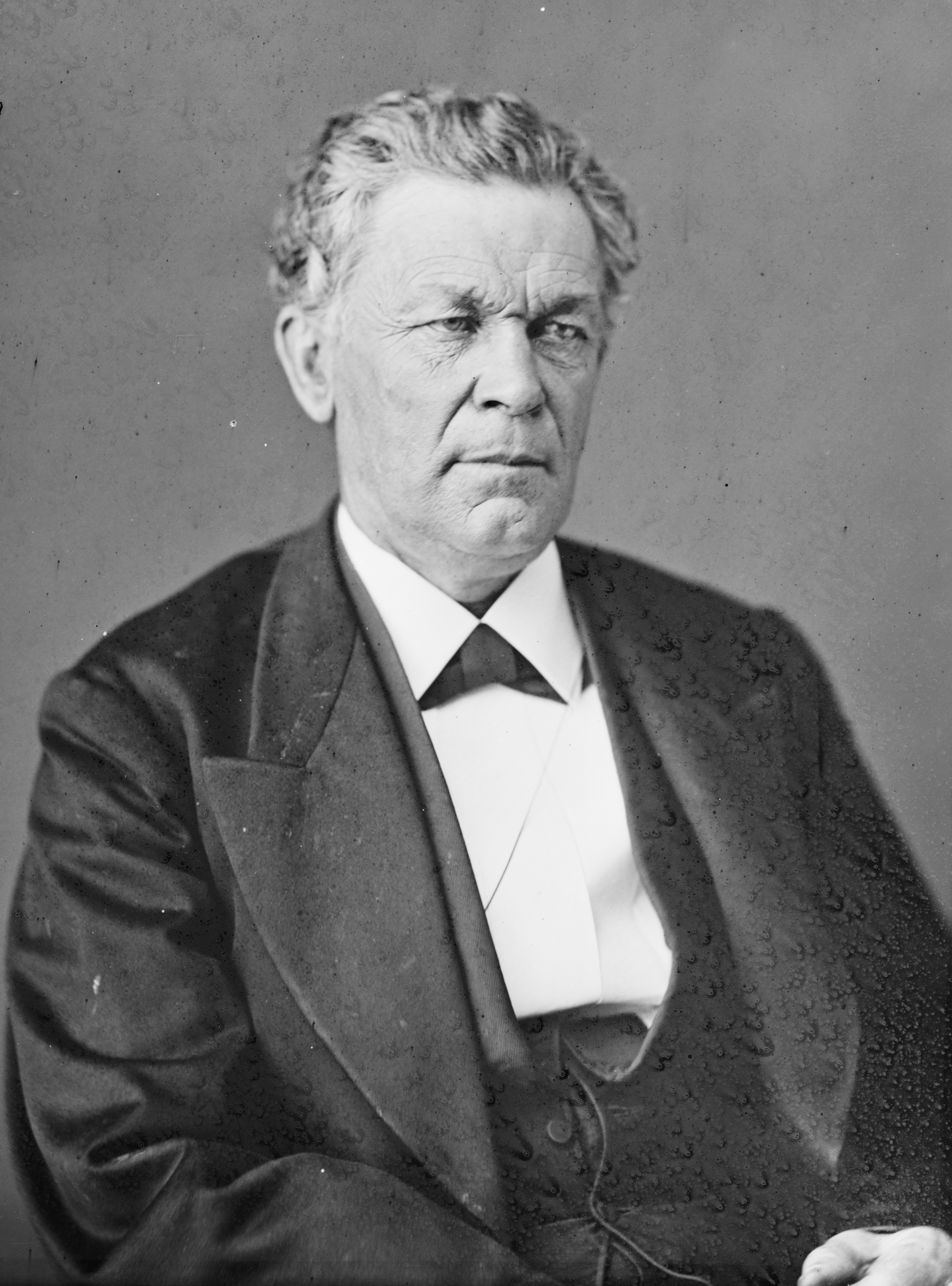

Delegate to the U.S. House of Representatives from Idaho Territory
- In office June 23, 1876 – March 3, 1879
- Preceded by: Thomas W. Bennett
- Succeeded by: George Ainslie

Member of the Idaho Territorial House of Representatives
- In office 1872–1873
- Constituency: Nez Perce County

Member of the Idaho Territorial Council
- In office 1864–1867
- Constituency: Idaho County

Personal details
- Born: March 28, 1820 Watertown, Connecticut, US
- Died: December 8, 1892 (aged 72) Blackfoot, Idaho, US
- Party: Democratic
- Profession: Attorney

Stephen Southmyd Fenn (March 28, 1820 – December 8, 1892) was an American politician who served as a congressional territorial delegate from the Idaho Territory.

Born in Watertown, Connecticut, Fenn moved to Niagara County, New York, with his parents in 1824. He attended public schools and moved in 1841 to Jackson County, Iowa, where he held several local offices. Fenn moved to California in 1850 and was engaged in mining and ranching, studied law, and later was admitted to the bar in 1862, then commenced practice in that part of Washington Territory which became a part of the Territory of Idaho upon its organization in 1863. He also engaged in mining and served as a member of the Idaho Territorial Council from 1864 to 1867. Fenn served as district attorney for the first judicial district in 1869 and was elected in 1872 as a member of the Territorial House of Representatives and as its speaker.

He engaged in agricultural pursuits and successfully contested as a Democrat the election of Thomas W. Bennett to the forty-fourth Congress. Fenn was reelected to the forty-fifth Congress and served from June 23, 1876, to March 3, 1879. He was not a candidate for renomination in 1878 and continued his former pursuits until July 1891. Fenn's mind weakened in his later years and he died in the insane asylum in Blackfoot, Idaho, on December 8, 1892.

The community of Fenn on the Camas Prairie in Idaho County is named for Fenn and his son, Major Frank A. Fenn.

U.S. House of Representatives
| Preceded by Thomas W. Bennett | Delegate to the U.S. House of Representatives from Idaho; 1876–1879 | Succeeded by George Ainslie |
