= George Sumner Bridges =

American sociologist and university administrator

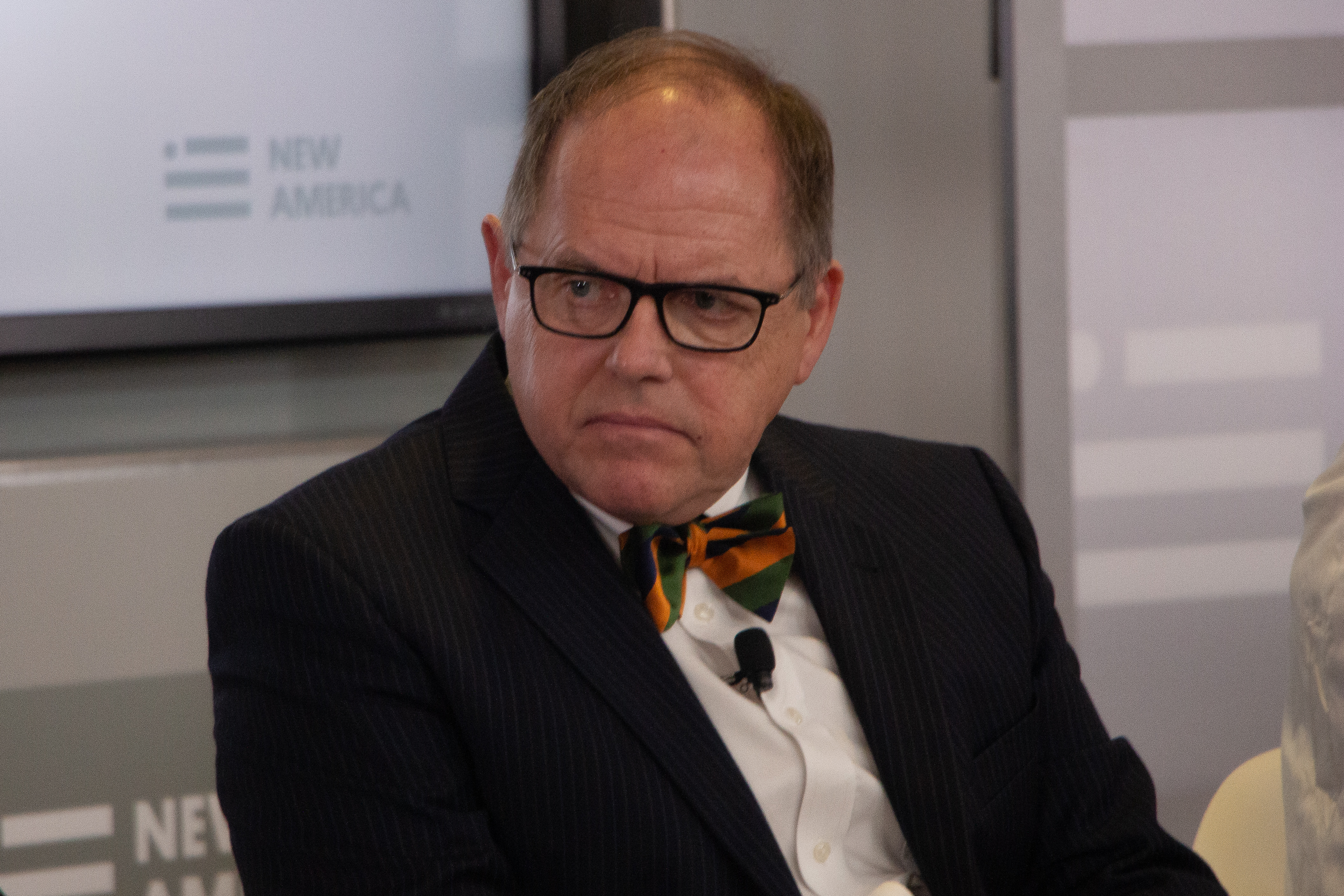

6th President of Evergreen State College
- In office October 1, 2015 – June 30, 2021
- Preceded by: Thomas L. "Les" Purce
- Succeeded by: John Carmichael

13th President of Whitman College
- In office July 1, 2005 – June 30, 2015
- Succeeded by: Kathleen M. Murray

Personal details
- Born: September 16, 1950 (age 76) Seattle, Washington, U.S.
- Education: University of Washington (BA); University of Pennsylvania (MA, PhD)

George Sumner Bridges (born September 16, 1950) is an American sociologist and academic administrator who served as the president of The Evergreen State College from October 2015 through June 2021.

== Early life and education ==
A native of Seattle, Washington, Bridges earned a Bachelor of Arts degree from the University of Washington, followed by a Master of Arts in criminology and PhD in sociology from the University of Pennsylvania.

== Career ==
=== Government service ===
While completing his doctoral work, he served for five years as a social scientist in the United States Department of Justice in the staff office of the United States Attorney General. One of his roles was as assistant administrator of the Federal Justice Research Program, conducting, designing, and funding research on federal legal policy.

=== Academic career ===
In 1981, Bridges accepted his first academic appointment in sociology at Case Western Reserve University. In 1982, he moved to his alma mater, the University of Washington, with an appointment in the department of sociology. At UW, he rose to the rank of professor and associate dean and associate vice provost of undergraduate education. In 2000, he was appointed dean and vice provost of undergraduate education.

Bridges’ scholarly work has examined crime and its measurement as well as law and the administration of law and justice. He has published articles in leading professional journals and several books on these subjects. He studies the causes of racial disparities in imprisonment, identifying the mechanisms by which perceptual biases of racial and ethnic minorities give rise to disproportionately punitive outcomes for minority defendants in criminal cases.

As dean and vice provost at the University of Washington, he led initiatives to advance innovation in teaching and learning for undergraduate students.

==== Whitman College ====
Bridges served as the 13th president of Whitman College in Walla Walla, Washington, from July 1, 2005, to June 30, 2015, replacing Tom Cronin. At Whitman, Bridges led the college's $150 million fundraising campaign, which reported $157 million raised as of March 31, 2015. During his tenure, the college opened the Glover Alston Center (2010); launched initiatives and dedicated funding for innovation in teaching, such as the Cross-Disciplinary Learning and Teaching Initiative; established the college's Global Studies Initiative with a $345,000 grant from The Andrew W. Mellon Foundation and expanded academic programs in the life sciences and computer science. The Whitman College Student Engagement Center was also established during Bridges' tenure which, in 2014, offered 120 paid summer internships to Whitman students. In May 2012, Bridges secured a Mellon Grant for $150,000 for "Higher Education and Scholarship in the Humanities" with a focus on "Presidential Leadership."

Bridges's leadership at Whitman College was not without controversy. In 2010, Whitman College ended "need blind" admissions and by 2014 became the least economically diverse top college in the United States.

While serving at Whitman College, Bridges was appointed to the board of directors of the National Association of Independent Colleges and Universities (NAICU) in 2009. In 2013 he was named Vice Chair of the Annapolis Group of the nation's 102 leading liberal arts colleges and served as Chair of the Annapolis Group in 2014–15. He serves as chair of the Board of Directors of the Independent Colleges of Washington. He also serves on the Board of Directors of the Chamber of Commerce in the city of Walla Walla, Washington, the home of Whitman College.

==== Evergreen State ====
In March 2015, Bridges was named president of Evergreen State College in Olympia, Washington, succeeding Thomas L. "Les" Purce.

Bridges was president in 2017 when the campus was shut down as a result of a series of protests over racism and oppression on campus. Bridges was also present when Campus Police notified a professor, Bret Weinstein, that he was unsafe on campus due to the protests.

At the time Bridges assumed the role of president of Evergreen, student enrollment was already declining: It was 4,891 in 2009 and declined to 4,190 the year Bridges started. Under George Bridges's leadership, the college full-time student enrollment decreased from 4,225 in 2015 to 2,209 in 2020.

== Publications ==
- George S Bridges and Martha A. Myers, eds. Inequality, Crime and Social Control, 1994, Boulder. Colo.: Westview Press.
- George S. Bridges, Robert D. Crutchfield and Joseph G. Weis, eds. Crime and Society: Criminal Justice, 1996, Thousand Oaks, Ca.: Pine Forge Press.
- George S. Bridges and Scott Desmond, eds. Teaching and Learning in Large Classes, 2000, Washington D.C: American Sociological Association.
