= Thomas W. Bennett (Idaho politician) =

American politician

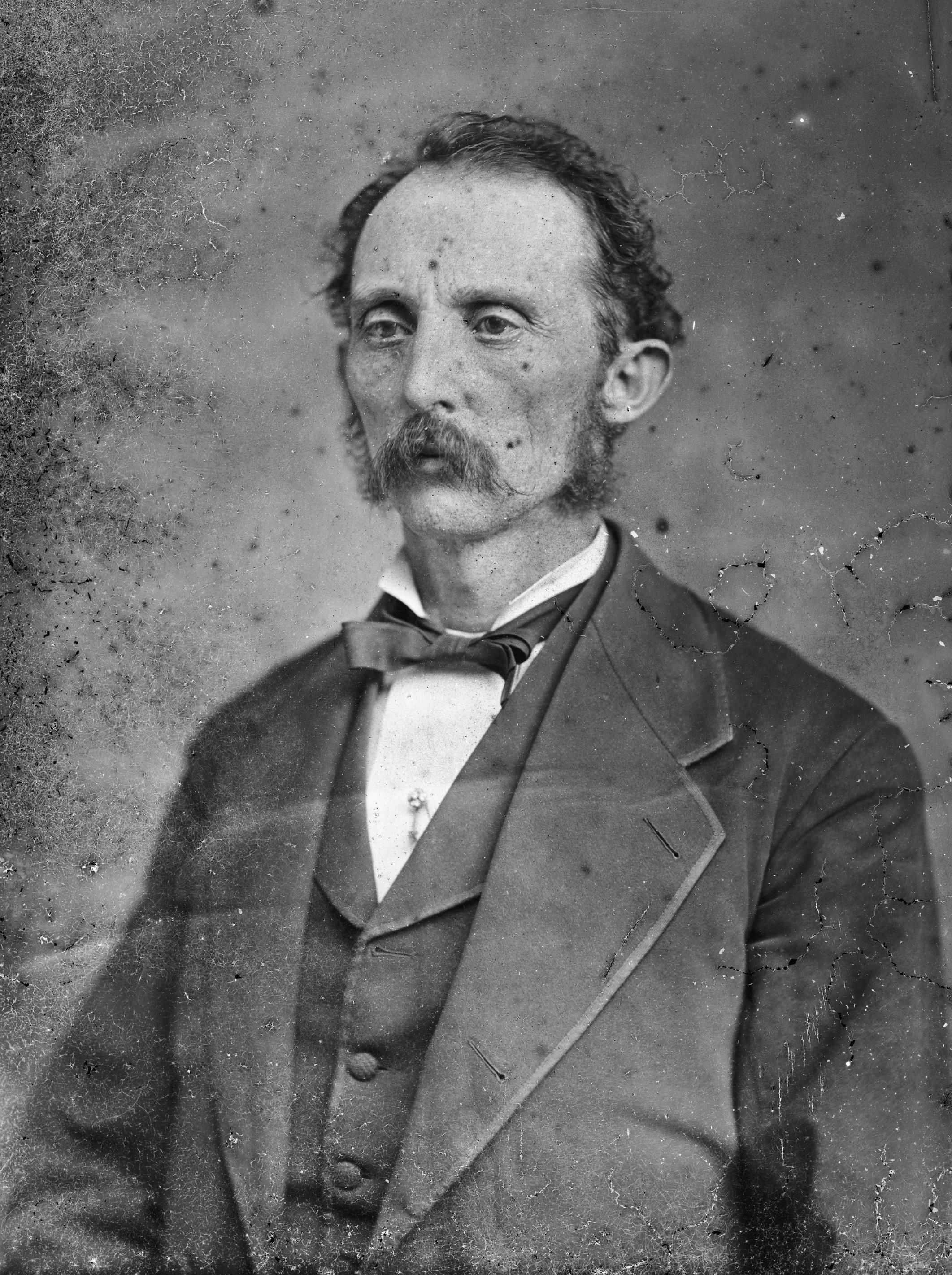

Delegate to the U.S. House of Representatives from Idaho Territory
- In office March 4, 1875 – June 23, 1876
- Preceded by: John Hailey
- Succeeded by: Stephen S. Fenn

5th Governor of Idaho Territory
- In office 1871–1875
- Preceded by: Thomas M. Bowen
- Succeeded by: David P. Thompson

Personal details
- Born: February 16, 1831 Union County, Indiana, U.S.
- Died: February 2, 1893 (aged 61) Richmond, Indiana, U.S.
- Party: Republican, Independent (after 1874)
- Spouse(s): Huldah Ann Atherton (1834-1854). Married December 27, 1852, in Putnam, Indiana; Anna M. Casterline (1858 onwards)
- Profession: Attorney

Thomas Warren Bennett (February 16, 1831, in Union County, Indiana – February 2, 1893) was the governor of Idaho Territory from 1871 to 1875. He also served as a Congressional delegate from the territory from March 4,1875, to June 23,1876, and previously served in the Indiana State Senate.

== Biography ==
Bennett was born in Union County, Indiana. He left his father's farm in 1850 to attend Indiana Asbury University (now DePaul University) where he received his law degree in 1855.

== Career ==
Bennett returned to Liberty and practiced there until the Civil War. He raised a company of volunteers and was commissioned captain, and attained the rank of colonel and was brevetted brigadier general. A year after his move to Richmond, Indiana, he was elected mayor and served for two years.

Bennett, a Civil War veteran and local politician in his native Indiana, was the fifth choice of President Ulysses S. Grant to succeed David W. Ballard as Idaho Territory governor. Grant's first two nominees accepted the appointment, but then each quickly decided to instead accept other government appointments before they ever travelled to Idaho. A third choice declined the offer entirely, while the fourth, Thomas M. Bowen, disliked the Idaho landscape so intensely that he resigned from the governorship and returned east after only one week in office. As a result, fifth choice Bennett took office several months after Ballard's term expired; all told, the territory had been effectively without a governor for an entire year when Bennett accepted the position. He was Governor of Idaho Territory from 1871 to 1875.

In 1874 Bennett was declared the winner of the election for Congressional delegate from Idaho Territory. Bennett served until June 1876 when a recount determined his opponent in the 1874 election, Stephen S. Fenn, was the actual winner. Upon leaving office Bennett returned to Indiana.

== Death ==
Bennett died on February 2, 1893, in Richmond, Wayne County, Indiana. He is interred at Earlham Cemetery, Richmond.

U.S. House of Representatives
Preceded by John Hailey	Delegate to the U.S. House of Representatives from Idaho; 1875-1876	Succeeded by Stephen Southmyd Fenn
