= Burton L. French =

American politician

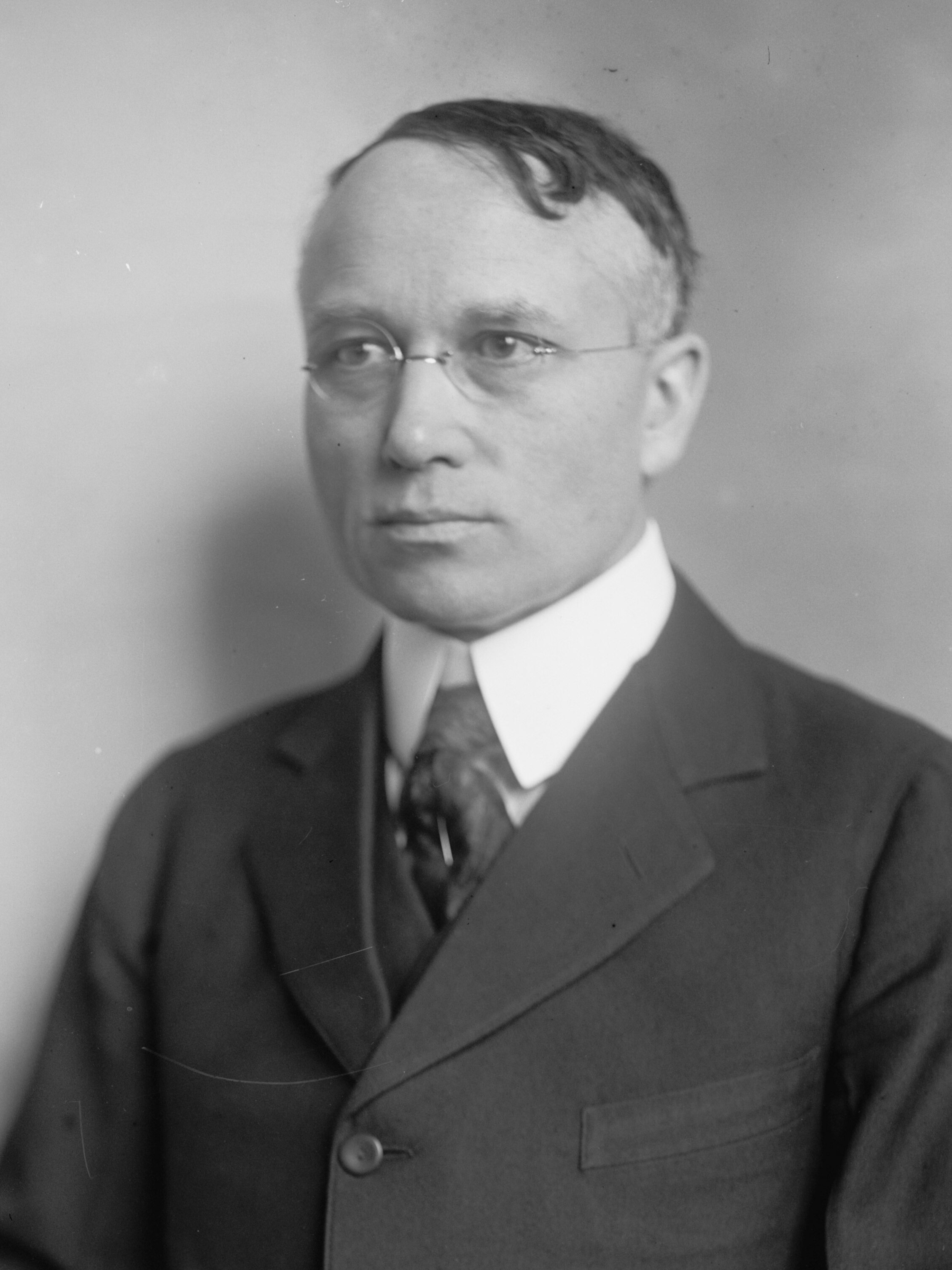

Member of the U.S. House of Representatives from Idaho
- In office March 4, 1917 – March 3, 1933
- Preceded by: Robert M. McCracken
- Succeeded by: Compton I. White
- Constituency: At-large district (1917–1919); 1st district (1919–1933)
- In office March 4, 1911 – March 3, 1915
- Preceded by: Thomas R. Hamer
- Succeeded by: Robert M. McCracken
- Constituency: At-large district
- In office March 4, 1903 – March 3, 1909
- Preceded by: Thomas L. Glenn
- Succeeded by: Thomas R. Hamer
- Constituency: At-large district

Member of the Idaho state legislature
- In office 1898–1902

Personal details
- Born: Burton Lee French; August 1, 1875 Delphi, Indiana, U.S.
- Died: September 12, 1954 (aged 79) Hamilton, Ohio, U.S.
- Resting place: Moscow Cemetery, Moscow, Idaho, U.S.
- Party: Republican
- Spouse: Winifred Estel Hartley (m. 1904; died 1934)
- Children: 1
- Education: University of Idaho; University of Chicago (Ph.M.)
- Profession: Attorney

Burton Lee French (August 1, 1875 – September 12, 1954) was a congressman from Idaho. French served as a Republican in the House from 1903 to 1909, 1911 to 1915 and 1917 to 1933. With a combined 26 years in office, he remains the longest-serving U.S. House member in Idaho history.

== Early years ==
Burton Lee French was born in Delphi, Indiana, to Mina Philippena French (née Fisher) and Charles Albert French. The fourth of nine children, he moved with his parents in 1880 to Kearney, Nebraska, and to Princeton, Idaho via San Francisco two years later. A year later they moved to Palouse, Washington, and French attended public schools and graduated in 1891. French entered the University of Idaho at Moscow in 1893, but interrupted his studies to teach school in Kendrick and Juliaetta, Idaho. He finished his degree in 1901 and then was a fellow at the University of Chicago 1901–1903 in political science and studied law. He was admitted to the bar and commenced practice back in Idaho at Moscow. French was a member of the state legislature from 1898 to 1902, first elected while an undergraduate student. While in the legislature, he met his wife, Winfred E. Hartley. She was a Boise schoolteacher from Nebraska and they were married in 1904. They had a daughter that died as an infant in 1908.

== Congress ==
French was first elected to Congress in 1902 at age 27 and won his last election in 1930. He was originally elected as the sole at-large member from Idaho, representing the entire state. Idaho gained a second seat for the 1912 election and both seats were at-large through the 1916 election. Beginning with the 1918 election, French represented the state's First Congressional District, with the term commencing in March 1919.

=== Election results ===
U.S. House elections (Idaho at-large): Results 1902–1910
Year	Democrat	Votes	Pct	Republican	Votes	Pct
1902				Burton French		
1904				Burton French (inc.)		
1906				Burton French (inc.)		
1910				Burton French		

U.S. House elections (Idaho at-large, seat A): Results 1912–1916
Year	Democrat	Votes	Pct	Republican	Votes	Pct
1912				Burton French (inc.)^		
1916				Burton French		

U.S. House elections (Idaho's 1st district): Results 1918–1934
Year	Democrat	Votes	Pct	Republican	Votes	Pct	3rd Party	Party	Votes	Pct
1918	L.I. Purcell	15,672	36.7%	Burton French (inc.)^	27,084	63.3%				
1920	Nell K. Irion	15,218	26.0%	Burton French (inc.)	34,654	59.3%	Riley Rice	Independent	8,605	14.7%
1922	George Waters	13,772	26.7%	Burton French (inc.)	24,167	46.8%	W.W. Deal	Progressive	13,673	26.5%
1924	Perry Mitchell	20,234	37.5%	Burton French (inc.)	33,347	61.8%	Roy Rabbit	Socialist	340	0.6%
1926	L.L Burtenshaw	15,903	33.7%	Burton French (inc.)	31,250	66.3%				
1928	Joe Tyler	19,064	30.0%	Burton French (inc.)	43,770	68.9%	Gust Nelson	Socialist	677	1.1%
1930	Compton White	18,657	35.1%	Burton French (inc.)	34,527	64.9%				
1932	Compton White	42,784	54.9%	Burton French (inc.)	32,545	41.8%	A. Cornell	Liberty	2,614	3.4%
1934	Compton White (inc.)	42,323	62.0%	Burton French	25,969	38.0%				

^ Incumbent when he won seat with new designation in 1912 and 1918.

== Death and burial ==
French died in Ohio in 1954 after a year's battle with leukemia. He had been a professor at Miami University in Oxford, Ohio, from 1935 to 1947, when he retired. His wife had died of an extended illness twenty years earlier in 1934 in Moscow and both are buried at Moscow Cemetery east of the city, with their infant daughter (1908).

U.S. House of Representatives
Preceded by Thomas L. Glenn	Member of the U.S. House of Representatives from Idaho's at-large congressional district 1903 – 1909	Succeeded by Thomas Ray Hamer
Preceded by Thomas Ray Hamer	Member of the U.S. House of Representatives from Idaho's at-large congressional district 1911 – 1915	Succeeded by Robert M. McCracken
Preceded by Robert M. McCracken	Member of the U.S. House of Representatives from Idaho's at-large congressional district 1917 – 1919	Succeeded by Himself (1st district)
Preceded by Himself (at-large)	Member of the U.S. House of Representatives from Idaho's 1st congressional district 1919 – 1933	Succeeded by Compton I. White, Sr.
