= Les Purce =

US politician and university administrator

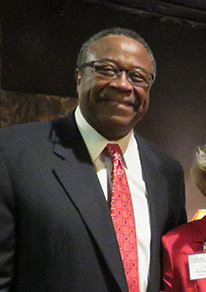
- Purce in 2015

5th President of Evergreen State College
- In office July 1, 2000 – October 1, 2015
- Preceded by: Jane L. Jervis
- Succeeded by: George Sumner Bridges

Director of Idaho Department of Health and Welfare
- In office 1977–1987
- Governor: John Evans

Mayor of Pocatello
- In office 1976–1977
- Preceded by: Chuck Billmeyer
- Succeeded by: Donna Boe

Member of Pocatello City Council
- In office 1973–1976

Personal details
- Born: Thomas Leslie Purce; November 13, 1946 (age 80) Pocatello, Idaho, U.S.

Thomas Leslie Purce (born November 13, 1946) is an American politician, conservationist, and university administrator who served as president of Evergreen State College from July 2000 through October 2015. A member of the Democratic Party, Purce served as Director of the Idaho Department of Health and Welfare under governor John Evans from 1977 to 1987. In 1973, Purce was elected to the Pocatello City Council, becoming the first African-American to be elected to public office in Idaho.

== Early life and education ==
Thomas L. Purce was born in 1946 in Pocatello, Idaho. His grandfather was Tracey Thompson, a well known rodeo performer in the state. After graduating high school, Purce attended and graduated from Idaho State University, where he would later work as an assistant to university president William E. Davis.

== Political career ==
Purce started his political career in 1973, when Purce ran for membership on the Pocatello city council. Upon his election, he was the first African-American to be elected in the State of Idaho. After three years of serving as a member of the city council, he would run to become Mayor of Pocatello, and would go on to be successfully elected.

After serving as Mayor for a year, he was appointed by Idaho governor John Evans in 1977 to serve as director of the Department of Health and Welfare, an office he held for ten years.

== University administration ==
In 2000, Purce was appointed as president of Evergreen State College. Prior to his appointment, he was the vice-president of Washington State University, and had already served as a senior executive at Evergreen State College from 1985 to 1995. During his presidency at Evergreen, he expanded the colleges admissions programs, and served as chair of the National Association of Intercollegiate Athletics council of presidents. In 2015, Purce resigned from his presidency at Evergreen.

== Conservationism ==
Since 2021, Purce has been active in preservation efforts of orcas in Puget Sound, serving as co-chair of the southern resident orca task force. In 2023, Washington Governor Jay Inslee appointed Purce to the Northwest Power and Conservation Council.

Purce is a critic of damming on the Lower Snake River.

== See also ==
- List of mayors of Pocatello, Idaho
- List of first African-American mayors
