= Robert M. McCracken =

American politician (1874–1934)

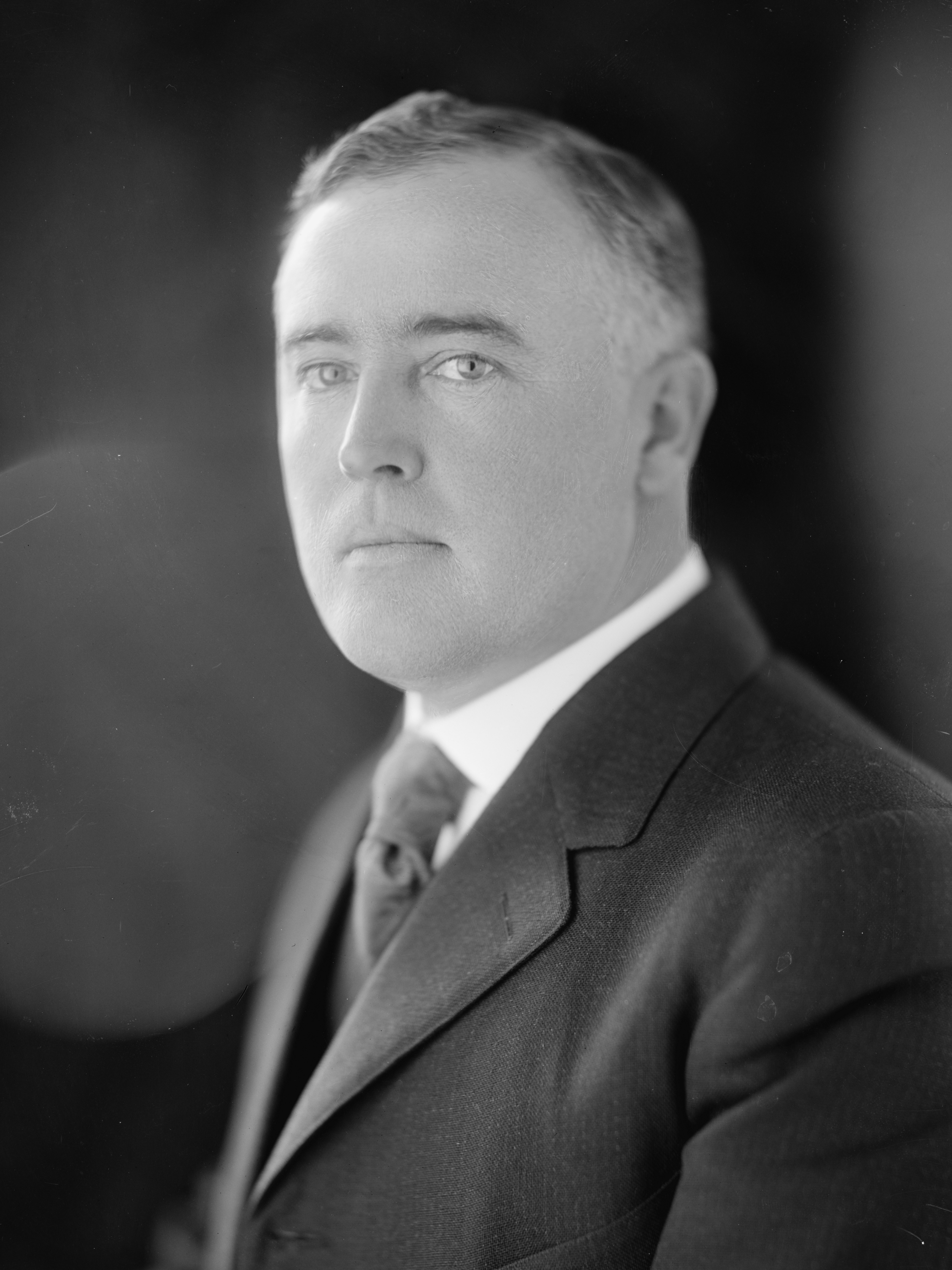

Member of the U.S. House of Representatives from Idaho's at-large district
- In office March 4, 1915 – March 3, 1917 Serving with Addison T. Smith
- Preceded by: Burton L. French
- Succeeded by: Burton L. French

Personal details
- Born: Robert McDowell McCracken; March 15, 1874 Vincennes, Indiana, U.S.
- Died: May 16, 1934 (aged 60) Emmett, Idaho, U.S.
- Resting place: Blackfoot Cemetery, Blackfoot, Idaho, U.S.
- Party: Republican
- Profession: Politician

Robert McDowell McCracken (March 15, 1874 – May 16, 1934) was a United States representative from Idaho. McCracken served one term as a Republican in the House, from 1915 to 1917.

Born in Vincennes, Indiana, McCracken was elected in 1914 as one of two at-large members from Idaho, representing the entire state alongside Addison T. Smith. In 1916 he was defeated for reelection in the Republican primary by former congressman Burton L. French.

While campaigning for a return to Congress in 1934, McCracken died in an automobile accident near Emmett. His vehicle went through a guard rail and tumbled down Freezeout Hill.

McCracken, age 60, was buried at Blackfoot Cemetery in Blackfoot.

U.S. House of Representatives
Preceded by Burton L. French	United States House of Representatives, Idaho At-Large; March 4, 1915–March 3, 1917	Succeeded by Burton L. French
