= Fayneese Miller =

American academic administrator

Fayneese S. Miller is an American academic administrator who served as the 20th president of Hamline University from July 2015 through mid 2024. Miller was previously a professor and dean of the college of education and social services at the University of Vermont. She was a professor of education at Brown University from 1985 to 2000.

== Life ==
Miller earned a B.A. in psychology from the Hampton University. She earned a M.S. and Ph.D. in experimental and social psychology from Texas Christian University. Miller completed post-doctoral research in applied social psychology at the Yale University.

Miller was a professor of education at Brown University from 1985 to 2000 where she served as the director for the center the study of race and ethnicity in America. She was the founding chairperson of ethnic studies. Miller was dean of the college of education and social services and a professor of leadership and developmental sciences at the University of Vermont.

On July 1, 2015, Miller became the 20th president of Hamline University. She is the first African-American and second woman in the position.

Miller received widespread criticism of her handling of a campus controversy regarding the display of images of Muhammad in an art history class. At a meeting on January 23, 2023, the university's faculty voted, 71–12, in favor of a statement requesting her resignation. In April 2023, Miller announced her intent to retire in June 2024.
