= Thomas R. Hamer =

American politician

Thomas Ray Hamer
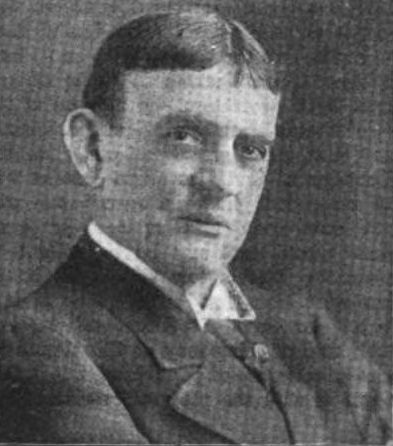

Member of the U.S. House of Representatives from Idaho's at-large district
- In office March 4, 1909 – March 3, 1911
- Preceded by: Burton L. French
- Succeeded by: Burton L. French

Member of the Idaho House of Representatives
- In office 1896-1898

Personal details
- Born: May 4, 1864 Vermont, Illinois, U.S.
- Died: December 22, 1950 (aged 86) Phoenix, Arizona, U.S.
- Party: Republican

Thomas Ray Hamer (May 4, 1864 – December 22, 1950) was a United States representative from Idaho. Hamer served as a single term as a Republican in the House from 1909 to 1911, representing the state at-large. Hamer attended Hedding College, and Indiana University School of Law - Bloomington (now Indiana University Maurer School of Law), and was admitted to the bar and commenced practice in St. Anthony, Idaho, in 1893. He engaged in agricultural pursuits in Fremont County, Idaho before entering politics. He was a member of the Idaho House of Representatives in 1896 and served until 1898 when he enlisted as a private in the First Regiment, Idaho Volunteer Infantry and served as captain and lieutenant colonel in the Philippine–American War. After his term in congress, Hamer resumed his law practice in St. Anthony, Idaho engaging in banking at St. Anthony and Boise, Idaho. He would go on to once again serve in the military as a major and lieutenant colonel in the Judge Advocate General’s Department, during the First World War; After his service he would re-locate to Portland, Oregon and practice private law, until 1943, when he retired and moved to Los Angeles, California. He died in Phoenix, Arizona, on December 22, 1950, at the age of 86.

Hamer is the namesake of the city of Hamer, Idaho.

== Notes ==
U.S. House of Representatives
Preceded by Burton L. French	Member of the U.S. House of Representatives from Idaho's at-large congressional district 1909 – 1911	Succeeded by Burton L. French
