= James Gunn (Idaho politician) =

Union United States Army officer (1843–1911)

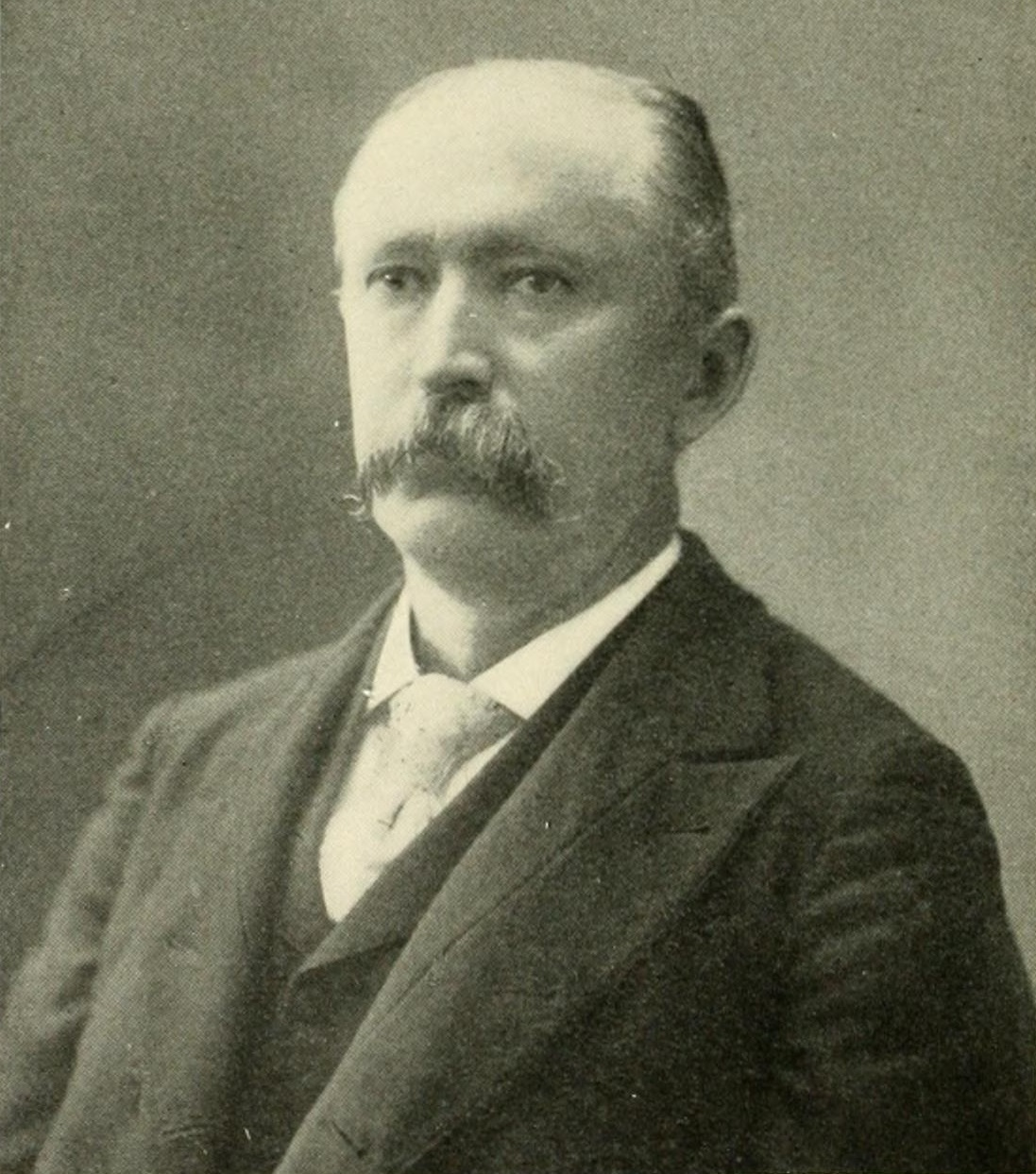

Member of the U.S. House of Representatives from Idaho's at-large district
- In office March 4, 1897 – March 3, 1899
- Preceded by: Edgar Wilson
- Succeeded by: Edgar Wilson

Personal details
- Born: March 6, 1843 County Fermanagh, Ireland
- Died: November 5, 1911 (aged 68) Boise, Idaho, U.S.
- Resting place: Morris Hill Cemetery; Boise, Idaho
- Party: Populist
- Profession: Journalist

James Gunn (March 6, 1843 – November 5, 1911) was a one-term U. S. congressman from the state of Idaho.

== Biography ==
Born in County Fermanagh, Ireland, Gunn emigrated to the United States with his parents while he was very young. The family settled in Wisconsin where he attended the common schools. James later attended the Notre Dame Academy in Indiana and taught school briefly before the Civil War.

In 1862, Gunn enlisted in the 27th Wisconsin Infantry and served with them for the remainder of the war. By the time he was discharged in October 1865, he was a Captain. He briefly studied law, but never practiced, and, in 1866, he headed west.

In the West, he followed opportunity and lived for a while in Gilpin County and Georgetown, Colorado. He also worked in Virginia City, Nevada, and in California before settling in Hailey, Idaho, in 1881. At Hailey, he went into the newspaper business, publishing the Wood River Valley Sentinel.

Gunn became a member of the Populist Party, and stood for office several times. When Idaho became a state in 1890, Gunn was elected to the Idaho State Senate.

He also served as editor of the Boise Sentinel until elected to the state's at-large seat in Congress. Gunn ran for the seat four times; in 1892, 1894, 1896, and 1898, but only his 1896 race was successful. He defeated Boise attorney William Borah, who later served over 32 years as a U.S. Senator (1907–40). Gunn lost his bid for re-election in 1898 to Edgar Wilson, a Silver Republican, whom had preceded Gunn in office as a Republican.

Gunn later was the commandant of the Idaho Soldiers' Home in 1901–03. He died in 1911 and is buried at Morris Hill Cemetery in Boise.

U.S. House of Representatives
Preceded by Edgar Wilson	Member of the U.S. House of Representatives from Idaho's at-large congressional district 1897 – 1899	Succeeded by Edgar Wilson
