= Addison T. Smith =

American politician (1862–1956)

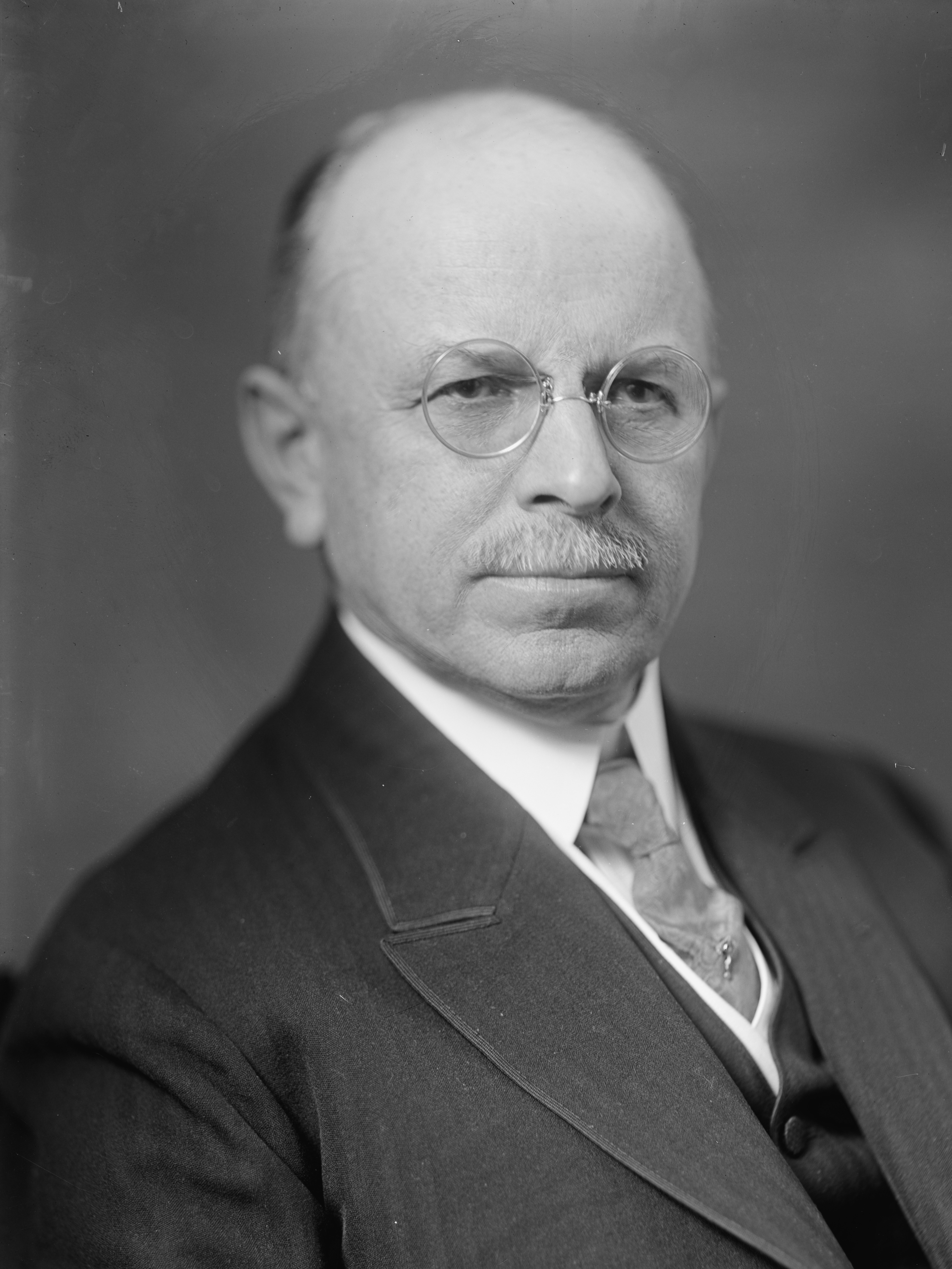

Member of the U.S. House of Representatives from Idaho
- In office March 4, 1913 – March 3, 1933
- Preceded by: District established
- Succeeded by: Thomas C. Coffin
- Constituency: At-large district (1913–1919); 2nd district (1919–1933)

Personal details
- Born: Addison Taylor Smith; September 5, 1862 Cambridge, Ohio, U.S.
- Died: July 5, 1956 (aged 93) Washington, D.C., U.S.
- Resting place: Rock Creek Cemetery; Washington, D.C., U.S.
- Party: Republican
- Spouse: Mary Fairchild Smith (m. 1889; died 1947)
- Children: 3
- Education: George Washington University Law School
- Profession: Attorney

Addison Taylor Smith (September 5, 1862 – July 5, 1956) was a congressman from Idaho. Smith served as a Republican in the U.S. House for ten terms, from 1913 to 1933.

Born in Cambridge, Ohio, Smith began his political career in 1891 in Washington, D.C. as a secretary for Republican U.S. Senator George L. Shoup of Idaho. He graduated from George Washington University Law School in 1895 and served on Shoup's staff until the senator's 1900 election defeat. In 1903 Smith joined the staff of U.S. Senator Weldon B. Heyburn, another Idaho Republican. Smith also served as secretary of the Idaho Republican Party.

By 1905 Smith established a residence in Idaho at Twin Falls. He was appointed as registrar of the United States Land Office in Boise in 1907.

== Congress ==
In 1912, Idaho added a second seat in the U.S. House, and Smith was elected as one of two at-large members from Idaho, representing the entire state. Beginning with the 1918 election, the state was separated into two districts and he represented the 2nd district. During his House tenure he chaired several committees, including the Committee on Alcohol Liquor Traffic, the Committee on Irrigation of Arid Lands and the Committee on Irrigation and Reclamation.

=== Election results ===
U.S. House elections (Idaho at-large, seat B): Results 1912–1916
Year	Democrat	Votes	Pct	Republican	Votes	Pct
1912				Addison Smith		
1914				Addison Smith (inc.)		
1916				Addison Smith (inc.)		

U.S. House elections (Idaho's 2nd district): Results 1918–1932
Year	Democrat	Votes	Pct	Republican	Votes	Pct	3rd Party	Party	Votes	Pct
1918	C.R. Jeppesen	18,827	36.8%	Addison Smith (inc.)^	32,274	63.2%				
1920	W.P. Whitaker	29,130	37.0%	Addison Smith (inc.)	49,642	63.0%				
1922	W.P. Whitaker	19,875	28.6%	Addison Smith (inc.)	33,206	47.8%	Dow Downing	Progressive	16,450	23.7%
1924	Asher Wilson	13,470	16.6%	Addison Smith (inc.)	44,365	54.5%	William Shuldberg	Progressive	23,357	28.7%
1926	Mary George Gray	11,259	16.7%	Addison Smith (inc.)	40,960	60.6%	H.F. Fait	Progressive	15,368	22.7%
1928	Ralph W. Harding	29,422	35.4%	Addison Smith (inc.)	53,236	64.1%	George Hibner	Socialist	362	0.4%
1930	W.F. Alworth	27,004	36.8%	Addison Smith (inc.)	46,342	63.2%				
1932	Thomas Coffin	58,138	55.0%	Addison Smith (inc.)	46,273	43.8%	William Goold	Liberty	1,201	1.1%

Source: ^ Incumbent when he won seat with new designation in 1918.

== After Congress ==
Smith, age 70, was defeated for re-election in 1932 by Democrat Thomas C. Coffin. In 1934, Smith was appointed to the Board of Veterans Appeals of the Veterans Administration, and served in that capacity until 1942. In 1937 he became director of the Columbia Institution for the Deaf (now Gallaudet University) in Washington, D.C., a position he held until his death.

Smith died at age 93 from lung cancer in 1956 and is buried in Rock Creek Cemetery in Washington, D.C. Addison Avenue, a major east–west thoroughfare in Twin Falls, is named after him.

== Notes ==
U.S. House of Representatives
Preceded by (new seat)	Member of the U.S. House of Representatives from Idaho's at-large congressional district March 4, 1913–March 3, 1919	Succeeded by At-large seats eliminated
Preceded by (new district)	Member of the U.S. House of Representatives from Idaho's 2nd congressional district March 4, 1919–March 3, 1933	Succeeded by Thomas C. Coffin
Political offices
Preceded by Moses P. Kinkaid; Nebraska	Chairman of the United States House Committee on Arid Lands; April 6, 1922–March 3, 1925	Succeeded by (committee dissolved)
Preceded by (committee formed)	Chairman of the United States House Committee on Irrigation and Reclamation; December 7, 1925–March 3, 1931	Succeeded by Robert S. Hall; Mississippi
