= Thomas C. Coffin =

American politician

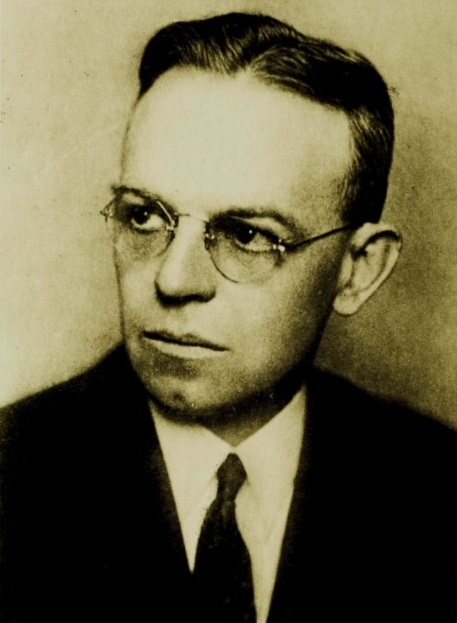

Member of the U.S. House of Representatives from Idaho's 2nd district
- In office March 4, 1933 – June 8, 1934
- Preceded by: Addison T. Smith
- Succeeded by: D. Worth Clark

Mayor of Pocatello
- In office 1931–1933
- Preceded by: Ivan Gasser
- Succeeded by: Elmer Smith

Personal details
- Born: October 25, 1887 Caldwell, Idaho Territory
- Died: June 8, 1934 (aged 46) Washington, D.C., US
- Resting place: Mountain View Cemetery; Pocatello, Idaho, US
- Party: Democratic
- Spouse: Aileen Franklin Coffin (m. 1920)
- Children: Jeanne Coffin (1922-2014)
- Profession: Attorney

Military service
- Allegiance: United States
- Branch/service: U.S. Navy
- Years of service: 1918
- Rank: Petty officer, second class
- Unit: Aviation
- Battles/wars: World War I

Thomas Chalkley Coffin (October 25, 1887 – June 8, 1934) was an American lawyer and veteran of World War I who served part of one term as a congressman from Idaho. As a Democrat, he served in the U.S. House from 1933 until his death in 1934.

== Biography ==
Born in Caldwell, Idaho Territory, Coffin moved with his family to nearby Boise in 1898. He attended Boise High School and then transferred back east to Phillips Exeter Academy in New Hampshire. Coffin then entered Yale University's Sheffield Scientific School, where he was a member of St. Anthony Hall, and was graduated from the law department of Yale University in 1910.

=== Early career ===
He was admitted to the bar in 1911 and was a deputy county attorney for Ada County in Boise and in 1913 became an assistant attorney general of Idaho. Coffin relocated east across the state to Pocatello in December 1915 and went into private practice.

=== World War I ===
He served in the U.S. Navy in World War I as a Petty officer, second class in the aviation division.

=== Congress and death in office ===
Coffin was elected mayor of Pocatello in 1931 and ran for Congress in the 2nd district in 1932. In the Democratic landslide, he defeated the ten-term Republican incumbent, Addison T. Smith.

Only fifteen months into his first term, Coffin was struck by a motorist on a driveway in the south grounds of the U.S. Capitol on June 4, 1934, and suffered a fractured skull. He died four days later at Providence Hospital in Washington, D.C., and was buried on June 14 in Pocatello.

=== Electoral results ===
U.S. House elections (Idaho's 2nd district): Results 1932
Year	Democrat	Votes	Pct	Republican	Votes	Pct	3rd Party	Party	Votes	Pct
1932	Thomas Coffin	58,138	55.0%	Addison Smith (inc.)	46,273	43.8%	William Goold	Liberty	1,201	1.1%

== See also ==
- List of members of the United States Congress who died in office (1900–1949)
- List of mayors of Pocatello, Idaho

U.S. House of Representatives
Preceded by Addison T. Smith	United States House of Representatives, Idaho Second Congressional District; March 4, 1933–June 8, 1934	Succeeded by D. Worth Clark
