= Thomas L. Glenn =

American politician

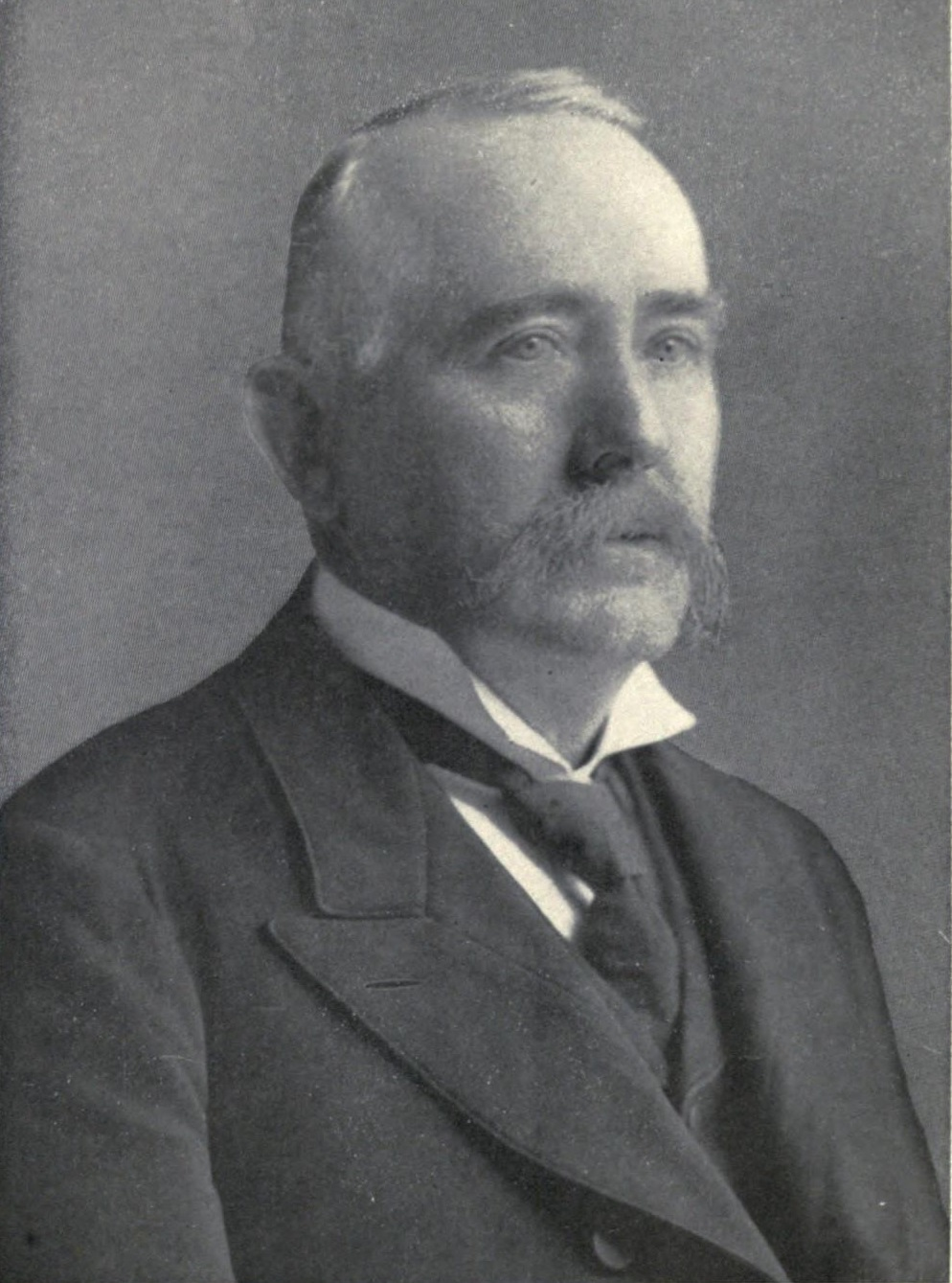

Member of the U.S. House of Representatives from Idaho's at-large district
- In office March 4, 1901 – March 3, 1903
- Preceded by: Edgar Wilson
- Succeeded by: Burton L. French

Member of the Kentucky Senate from the 2nd district
- In office August 1, 1887 – August 3, 1891
- Preceded by: John W. Ogilvie
- Succeeded by: John W. Ogilvie

Personal details
- Born: February 2, 1847 Bardwell, Kentucky, U.S.
- Died: November 18, 1918 (aged 71) Montpelier, Idaho, U.S.
- Resting place: Montpelier City Cemetery; Montpelier, Idaho, U.S.
- Party: Populist
- Spouse: Nellie S. Jones Glenn (1870–1910)
- Profession: Attorney

Thomas Louis Glenn (February 2, 1847 – November 18, 1918) was an attorney and politician from Idaho. Glenn served a single term as a Populist in Congress from 1901 to 1903, representing the state at-large.

== Biography ==
Glenn was born near Bardwell, Kentucky on February 2, 1847. He attended school in Kentucky and Evansville Commercial College in Evansville, Indiana.

During the American Civil War served in the Confederate States Army as a member of Company F, Second Kentucky Cavalry Regiment. He was wounded at the Battle of Mount Sterling on June 9, 1864. He was subsequently captured, and imprisoned at Transylvania University until he was paroled in September.

After the war Glenn worked on his family's farm. He was Ballard County Clerk from 1874 to 1882. From 1887 to 1891 he served in the Kentucky Senate.

Glenn studied law, was admitted to the bar in 1890, and began a practice in Montpelier, Idaho.

In 1900 Glenn was elected as a Populist to the Fifty-seventh Congress, and he served one term, March 4, 1901, to March 3, 1903. He was not a candidate for renomination in 1902.

Glenn served as Mayor of Montpelier in 1904, and also served as the local prosecuting attorney.

He died in Montpelier on November 18, 1918, and was buried at City Cemetery in Montpelier.

U.S. House of Representatives
Preceded by Edgar Wilson	Member of the U.S. House of Representatives from Idaho's at-large congressional district 1901 – 1903	Succeeded by Burton L. French
