= Edgar Wilson =

American politician

Member of the U.S. House of Representatives from Idaho's at-large district
- In office March 4, 1899 – March 3, 1901
- Preceded by: James Gunn
- Succeeded by: Thomas L. Glenn
- In office March 4, 1895 – March 3, 1897
- Preceded by: Willis Sweet
- Succeeded by: James Gunn

Delegate to the Idaho Constitutional Convention
- In office July 4, 1889 – August 6, 1889
- Constituency: Ada County

Personal details
- Born: February 25, 1861 Armstrong County, Pennsylvania, U.S.
- Died: January 3, 1915 (aged 53) Boise, Idaho, U.S.
- Resting place: Morris Hill Cemetery; Boise, Idaho, U.S.
- Party: Republican
- Other political affiliations: Silver Republican (after 1898)
- Spouse: Laura Da Shiell
- Education: University of Michigan
- Profession: Attorney

Edgar Wilson (February 25, 1861 – January 3, 1915) was a United States representative from Idaho.

Born in Armstrong County, Pennsylvania, Wilson graduated from the University of Michigan, and headed west and became an attorney in Boise, Idaho. He was elected city attorney in 1887 and district attorney in 1888 and was a member of the state's constitutional convention prior to statehood in 1890. Wilson served as a Republican in the House from 1895 to 1897 and as a Silver Republican from 1899 to 1901, representing the state at-large.

== Early life and family ==
Edgar Wilson was born February 25, 1861, to parents Ellen and Matthew Wilson. His family included two sisters and a brother.

Edgar's father, Matthew Wilson, joined the Union Army in 1862, and one account suggests he was wounded and captured at White Sulphur Springs, West Virginia, in 1863. He was promoted to captain while in prison, and he died a prisoner at Libby Prison in 1864. Another account is that Matthew Wilson was captured in the Battle of Turner's Gap in 1862, was taken to Libby Prison then moved to Charleston where he died of insufficient rations, inadequate clothing, and the deprivations of confinement 10 months after capture. Edgar Wilson would have been either two or three years old when his father died.

Wilson attended the University of Michigan and graduated with an LL.B. degree in law in 1884.

In 1890 he married Laura Da Shiell, and the couple raised two children in Boise, Laura and Maurice Edgar.

== Career ==
After graduating from law school, Edgar Wilson moved to Boise, Idaho Territory, and with Fremont Wood he formed the law firm of Wood & Wilson in 1884.

Wilson became Boise City attorney in 1887, and he was elected Ada County district attorney in 1888. In 1889 he was elected as a delegate to the Idaho Constitutional Convention. By this time, Wilson had become an accomplished orator, and some of his speeches to local organizations were printed in the Idaho Statesman.

In 1892 Wilson served as chairman of Idaho's Republican State Central Committee, and in 1894 the committee promoted William Borah for Congress. When Borah declined the nomination, Wilson replaced him, and that year Wilson was elected as Idaho's only representative in Congress. At the time, Idaho's population count was 84,385 persons.

While in Congress, Wilson supported legislation to fund a federal building in Idaho, and he introduced measures providing for survey and irrigation of the Idaho desert for agricultural purposes. He also promoted funding for a soldiers' home in southern Idaho, and he supported an expanded version of the McKinley Tariff that would benefit Idaho's mining interests. Toward the end of his first term in Congress, Wilson joined the Silver Republican Party, and he unsuccessfully sought election to the Idaho Supreme Court.

Returning to Boise in 1897, Wilson promoted expansion of the railroad to include Boise, and he supported extension of the new Boise sewer lines. He ran for Congress again in 1898 and easily won election on the Fusion Ticket. His committee assignments related to public lands, mines and mining, and irrigation. After his term ended in 1901, he did not seek office again in federal or state elections.

Wilson became a farmer in 1894, setting 50 acres of apple trees and later raising cattle. In 1898, he presented a paper, the Apple Orchard, to the Idaho State Horticultural Society. In 1901 he became vice president of the Southern Idaho Fruit Growers Association, and he negotiated rates for refrigerated rail car freight.

Among his other accomplishments, he organized the Boise Bank of Commerce and worked for other banking interests, and he served as president of the Boise school board. In 1900 he arranged a shipment of Idaho fruit to the Paris Exposition. A frequent voice at city council meetings, Wilson successfully lobbied for macadamized streets in Boise.

In 1905 Wilson attempted to change the name of the Snake River to Shoshonee, partly because "...the name Snake is repulsive, and the name of Shosho-nee is smooth and musical..."

== Alcoholism and death ==
In 1913 Wilson shot and wounded a deputy sheriff who discovered Wilson had a gun while in custody awaiting a hearing and judgement of his mental condition. After the hearing, Wilson was committed to the state asylum for two years, although he was released early in 1914. He then moved to Salt Lake City.

In August, 1914, Laura Wilson filed for divorce in Boise, and Edgar Wilson returned to Boise later that year to contest. While staying at the Owyhee Hotel, he developed a cold followed by pneumonia. He died January 3, 1915, in his hotel room.

After the death of her husband, Laura Wilson successfully contested his will, which left nothing to her nor to her son, Maurice Edgar Wilson. Evidence of her husband's longtime struggle with alcohol and drugs was presented along with allegations of marital infidelity, and family and friends testified that Edgar Wilson had become irrational, erratic, and mentally unsound.

In 1915 Laura Wilson donated her husband's library of 850 books to the College of Idaho. In 1977 the Edgar Wilson House (1904), 103 E Warm Springs Ave, became a contributing resource of Boise's West Warm Springs Historic District. The house was later demolished.

U.S. House of Representatives
| Preceded by Willis Sweet | United States House of Representatives, Idaho at-large 1895–1897 | Succeeded by James Gunn |
| Preceded by James Gunn | United States House of Representatives, Idaho at-large 1899–1901 | Succeeded by Thomas L. Glenn |
