= Idaho's at-large congressional district =

Former congressional district

- Obsolete district
- Created: 1890
- Eliminated: 1919
- Years active: 1890–1919

From its admittance as a state in 1890 to 1913, Idaho was represented in the United States House of Representatives by one at-large representative. After the 1910 census Idaho was awarded a second seat starting with the 63rd Congress in 1913. However both seats continued to be elected at-large on a general ticket until the election of 1918. Since that year the state has allocated two districts for its representatives.

== List of members representing the district ==
Cong ress	Years	Seat A			Seat B		
Cong ress	Years	Representative	Party	Electoral history	Representative	Party	Electoral history
51st 52nd 53rd	October 1, 1890 – March 3, 1895	Willis Sweet (Moscow)	Republican	Elected in 1890 and took seat upon statehood. Re-elected in 1890. Re-elected in 1892. Retired.			
54th	March 4, 1895 – March 3, 1897	Edgar Wilson (Boise City)	Republican	Elected in 1894. Retired to run for Idaho Supreme Court.			
55th	March 4, 1897 – March 3, 1899	James Gunn (Boise)	Populist	Elected in 1896. Lost re-election.			
56th	March 4, 1899 – March 3, 1901	Edgar Wilson (Boise)	Silver Republican	Elected in 1898. Retired.			
57th	March 4, 1901 – March 3, 1903	Thomas L. Glenn (Montpelier)	Populist	Elected in 1900. Retired.			
58th 59th 60th	March 4, 1903 – March 3, 1909	Burton L. French (Moscow)	Republican	Elected in 1902. Re-elected in 1904. Re-elected in 1906. Lost renomination.			
61st	March 4, 1909 – March 3, 1911	Thomas Ray Hamer (St. Anthony)	Republican	Elected in 1908. Lost renomination.			
62nd	March 4, 1911 – March 3, 1913	Burton L. French (Moscow)	Republican	Elected in 1910. Re-elected in 1912. Retired to run for U.S. senator.			
63rd	March 3, 1913 – March 3, 1915	Burton L. French (Moscow)	Republican	Elected in 1910. Re-elected in 1912. Retired to run for U.S. senator.	Addison T. Smith (Twin Falls)	Republican	Elected in 1912. Re-elected in 1914. Re-elected in 1916. Redistricted to the 2nd district.
64th	March 4, 1915 – March 3, 1917	Robert M. McCracken (Boise)	Republican	Elected in 1914. Lost renomination.	Addison T. Smith (Twin Falls)	Republican	Elected in 1912. Re-elected in 1914. Re-elected in 1916. Redistricted to the 2nd district.
65th	March 4, 1917 – March 3, 1919	Burton L. French (Moscow)	Republican	Elected in 1916. Redistricted to the 1st district.	Addison T. Smith (Twin Falls)	Republican	Elected in 1912. Re-elected in 1914. Re-elected in 1916. Redistricted to the 2nd district.
