= List of United States representatives in the 39th Congress =

This is a complete list of United States representatives during the 39th United States Congress listed by seniority.

As an historical article, the districts and party affiliations listed reflect those during the 39th Congress (March 4, 1865 – March 3, 1867). Seats and party affiliations on similar lists for other congresses will be different for certain members.

Seniority depends on the date on which members were sworn into office. Since many members are sworn in on the same day, subsequent ranking is based on previous congressional service of the individual and then by alphabetical order by the last name of the representative.

Committee chairmanship in the House is often associated with seniority. However, party leadership is typically not associated with seniority.

Note: The "*" indicates that the representative/delegate may have served one or more non-consecutive terms while in the House of Representatives of the United States Congress.

== U.S. House seniority list ==
U.S. House seniority
Rank	Representative	Party	District	Seniority date (Previous service, if any)	No.# of term(s)	Notes
1	Elihu B. Washburne	R	IL-03	March 4, 1853	7th term	Dean of the House
2	Schuyler Colfax	R	IN-09	March 4, 1855	6th term	Speaker of the House
3	Justin S. Morrill	R	VT-02	March 4, 1855	6th term	Left the House in 1867.
4	Henry L. Dawes	R	MA-10	March 4, 1857	5th term	
5	Daniel W. Gooch	R	MA-06	January 31, 1858	5th term	Resigned on September 1, 1865.
6	John B. Alley	R	MA-05	March 4, 1859	4th term	Left the House in 1867.
7	James M. Ashley	R	OH-10	March 4, 1859	4th term	
8	Thomas D. Eliot	R	MA-01	March 4, 1859; Previous service, 1854–1855.	5th term*	
9	James K. Moorhead	R	PA-22	March 4, 1859	4th term	
10	Alexander H. Rice	R	MA-03	March 4, 1859	4th term	Left the House in 1867.
11	Thaddeus Stevens	R	PA-09	March 4, 1859; Previous service, 1849–1853.	6th term*	
12	Edwin Hanson Webster	UU	MD-02	March 4, 1859	4th term	Resigned in July 1865.
13	William Windom	R	MN-01	March 4, 1859	4th term	
14	Sydenham E. Ancona	D	PA-08	March 4, 1861	3rd term	Left the House in 1867.
15	Portus Baxter	R	VT-03	March 4, 1861	3rd term	Left the House in 1867.
16	Fernando C. Beaman	R	MI-01	March 4, 1861	3rd term	
17	Henry Grider	D	KY-03	March 4, 1861; Previous service, 1843–1847.	5th term*	Died on September 7, 1866.
18	Aaron Harding	R	KY-04	March 4, 1861	3rd term	Left the House in 1867.
19	Philip Johnson	D	PA-11	March 4, 1861	3rd term	Died on January 29, 1867.
20	George W. Julian	R	IN-05	March 4, 1861; Previous service, 1849–1851.	4th term*	
21	William D. Kelley	R	PA-04	March 4, 1861	3rd term	
22	Frederick A. Pike	R	ME-05	March 4, 1861	3rd term	
23	Theodore M. Pomeroy	R	NY-24	March 4, 1861	3rd term	
24	John H. Rice	R	ME-04	March 4, 1861	3rd term	Left the House in 1867.
25	Edward H. Rollins	R	NH-02	March 4, 1861	3rd term	Left the House in 1867.
26	Francis Thomas	UU	MD-04	March 4, 1861; Previous service, 1831–1841.	8th term*	
27	Daniel W. Voorhees	D	IN-07	March 4, 1861	3rd term	Resigned on February 23, 1866.
28	James F. Wilson	R	IA-01	October 8, 1861	3rd term	
29	Samuel Hooper	R	MA-04	December 2, 1861	3rd term	
30	Walter D. McIndoe	R	WI-06	January 26, 1863	3rd term	Left the House in 1867.
31	William B. Allison	R	IA-03	March 4, 1863	2nd term	
32	Oakes Ames	R	MA-02	March 4, 1863	2nd term	
33	John D. Baldwin	R	MA-08	March 4, 1863	2nd term	
34	James G. Blaine	R	ME-03	March 4, 1863	2nd term	
35	Henry T. Blow	R	MO-02	March 4, 1863	2nd term	Left the House in 1867.
36	George S. Boutwell	R	MA-07	March 4, 1863	2nd term	
37	Augustus Brandegee	R	CT-03	March 4, 1863	2nd term	Left the House in 1867.
38	James Brooks	D	NY-08	March 4, 1863; Previous service, 1849–1853.	4th term*	Unseated on April 7, 1866.
39	John Martin Broomall	R	PA-07	March 4, 1863	2nd term	
40	John W. Chanler	D	NY-07	March 4, 1863	2nd term	
41	Amasa Cobb	R	WI-03	March 4, 1863	2nd term	
42	Thomas T. Davis	R	NY-23	March 4, 1863	2nd term	Left the House in 1867.
43	John L. Dawson	D	PA-21	March 4, 1863; Previous service, 1851–1855.	4th term*	Left the House in 1867.
44	Henry C. Deming	R	CT-01	March 4, 1863	2nd term	Left the House in 1867.
45	Charles Denison	D	PA-12	March 4, 1863	2nd term	
46	Nathan F. Dixon II	R	RI-02	March 4, 1863; Previous service, 1849–1851.	3rd term*	
47	Ignatius L. Donnelly	R	MN-02	March 4, 1863	2nd term	
48	John F. Driggs	R	MI-06	March 4, 1863	2nd term	
49	Ebenezer Dumont	R	IN-06	March 4, 1863	2nd term	Left the House in 1867.
50	Ephraim R. Eckley	R	OH-17	March 4, 1863	2nd term	
51	Charles A. Eldredge	D	WI-04	March 4, 1863	2nd term	
52	John F. Farnsworth	R	IL-02	March 4, 1863; Previous service, 1857–1861.	4th term*	
53	William E. Finck	D	OH-12	March 4, 1863	2nd term	Left the House in 1867.
54	James A. Garfield	R	OH-19	March 4, 1863	2nd term	
55	Josiah B. Grinnell	R	IA-04	March 4, 1863	2nd term	Left the House in 1867.
56	John A. Griswold	R	NY-15	March 4, 1863	2nd term	
57	Benjamin Gwinn Harris	D	MD-05	March 4, 1863	2nd term	Left the House in 1867.
58	William Higby	R	CA-02	March 4, 1863	2nd term	
59	Giles W. Hotchkiss	R	NY-26	March 4, 1863	2nd term	Left the House in 1867.
60	Asahel W. Hubbard	R	IA-06	March 4, 1863	2nd term	
61	John H. Hubbard	R	CT-04	March 4, 1863	2nd term	Left the House in 1867.
62	Calvin T. Hulburd	R	NY-17	March 4, 1863	2nd term	
63	Thomas Jenckes	R	RI-01	March 4, 1863	2nd term	
64	John A. Kasson	R	IA-05	March 4, 1863	2nd term	Left the House in 1867.
65	Orlando Kellogg	R	NY-16	March 4, 1863; Previous service, 1847–1849.	3rd term*	Died on August 24, 1865.
66	Francis Celeste Le Blond	D	OH-05	March 4, 1863	2nd term	Left the House in 1867.
67	Benjamin F. Loan	R	MO-07	March 4, 1863	2nd term	
68	John W. Longyear	R	MI-03	March 4, 1863	2nd term	Left the House in 1867.
69	James M. Marvin	R	NY-18	March 4, 1863	2nd term	
70	Joseph W. McClurg	R	MO-05	March 4, 1863	2nd term	
71	Daniel Morris	R	NY-25	March 4, 1863	2nd term	Left the House in 1867.
72	Leonard Myers	R	PA-03	March 4, 1863	2nd term	
73	Charles O'Neill	R	PA-02	March 4, 1863	2nd term	
74	Godlove Stein Orth	R	IN-08	March 4, 1863	2nd term	
75	James W. Patterson	R	NH-03	March 4, 1863	2nd term	Left the House in 1867.
76	Sidney Perham	R	ME-02	March 4, 1863	2nd term	
77	Hiram Price	R	IA-02	March 4, 1863	2nd term	
78	William Radford	D	NY-10	March 4, 1863	2nd term	Left the House in 1867.
79	Samuel J. Randall	D	PA-01	March 4, 1863	2nd term	
80	William H. Randall	UU	KY-08	March 4, 1863	2nd term	Left the House in 1867.
81	Andrew J. Rogers	D	NJ-04	March 4, 1863	2nd term	Left the House in 1867.
82	Lewis Winans Ross	D	IL-09	March 4, 1863	2nd term	
83	Robert C. Schenck	R	OH-03	March 4, 1863; Previous service, 1843–1851.	6th term*	
84	Glenni W. Scofield	R	PA-19	March 4, 1863	2nd term	
85	Ithamar Sloan	R	WI-02	March 4, 1863	2nd term	Left the House in 1867.
86	Green C. Smith	UU	KY-06	March 4, 1863	2nd term	Resigned in July 1866.
87	Rufus P. Spalding	R	OH-18	March 4, 1863	2nd term	
88	John F. Starr	R	NJ-01	March 4, 1863	2nd term	Left the House in 1867.
89	Myer Strouse	D	PA-10	March 4, 1863	2nd term	Left the House in 1867.
90	Martin R. Thayer	R	PA-05	March 4, 1863	2nd term	Left the House in 1867.
91	Charles Upson	R	MI-02	March 4, 1863	2nd term	
92	William B. Washburn	R	MA-09	March 4, 1863	2nd term	
93	Thomas Williams	R	PA-23	March 4, 1863	2nd term	
94	Charles H. Winfield	D	NY-11	March 4, 1863	2nd term	Left the House in 1867.
95	Frederick E. Woodbridge	R	VT-01	March 4, 1863	2nd term	
96	Kellian Whaley	U	WV-03	December 7, 1863; Previous service, 1861–1863.	3rd term*	Left the House in 1867.
97	Ebon C. Ingersoll	R	IL-05	May 20, 1864	2nd term	
98	George W. Anderson	R	MO-09	March 4, 1865	1st term	
99	Delos R. Ashley	R	NV	March 4, 1865	1st term	
100	Jehu Baker	R	IL-12	March 4, 1865	1st term	
101	Abraham Andrews Barker	R	PA-17	March 4, 1865	1st term	Left the House in 1867.
102	John F. Benjamin	R	MO-08	March 4, 1865	1st term	
103	Teunis G. Bergen	D	NY-02	March 4, 1865	1st term	Left the House in 1867.
104	John Bidwell	R	CA-03	March 4, 1865	1st term	Left the House in 1867.
105	John Bingham	R	OH-16	March 4, 1865; Previous service, 1855–1863.	5th term*	
106	Benjamin M. Boyer	D	PA-06	March 4, 1865	1st term	
107	Henry P. H. Bromwell	R	IL-07	March 4, 1865	1st term	
108	Ralph P. Buckland	R	OH-09	March 4, 1865	1st term	
109	Hezekiah S. Bundy	R	OH-11	March 4, 1865	1st term	Left the House in 1867.
110	Reader W. Clarke	D	OH-06	March 4, 1865	1st term	
111	Sidney Clarke	R	KS	March 4, 1865	1st term	
112	Roscoe Conkling	R	NY-21	March 4, 1865; Previous service, 1859–1863.	3rd term*	Left the House in 1867.
113	Burton C. Cook	R	IL-06	March 4, 1865	1st term	
114	Shelby M. Cullom	R	IL-08	March 4, 1865	1st term	
115	Charles Vernon Culver	R	PA-20	March 4, 1865	1st term	Left the House in 1867.
116	William A. Darling	R	NY-09	March 4, 1865	1st term	Left the House in 1867.
117	Joseph H. Defrees	R	IN-10	March 4, 1865	1st term	Left the House in 1867.
118	Columbus Delano	R	OH-13	March 4, 1865; Previous service, 1845–1847.	2nd term*	Left the House in 1867.
119	James H. D. Henderson	R	OR	March 4, 1865	1st term	Left the House in 1867.
120	Benjamin Eggleston	R	OH-01	March 4, 1865	1st term	
121	John H. Farquhar	R	IN-04	March 4, 1865	1st term	Left the House in 1867.
122	Thomas W. Ferry	R	MI-04	March 4, 1865	1st term	
123	Adam J. Glossbrenner	D	PA-15	March 4, 1865	1st term	
124	Charles Goodyear	D	NY-14	March 4, 1865; Previous service, 1845–1847.	2nd term*	Left the House in 1867.
125	Abner C. Harding	R	IL-04	March 4, 1865	1st term	
126	Roswell Hart	R	NY-28	March 4, 1865	1st term	Left the House in 1867.
127	Rutherford B. Hayes	R	OH-02	March 4, 1865	1st term	
128	Ralph Hill	R	IN-03	March 4, 1865	1st term	Left the House in 1867.
129	John Hogan	D	MO-01	March 4, 1865	1st term	Left the House in 1867.
130	Sidney T. Holmes	R	NY-22	March 4, 1865	1st term	Left the House in 1867.
131	Chester D. Hubbard	U	WV-01	March 4, 1865	1st term	
132	Demas Hubbard, Jr.	R	NY-19	March 4, 1865	1st term	Left the House in 1867.
133	Edwin N. Hubbell	D	NY-13	March 4, 1865	1st term	Left the House in 1867.
134	James Randolph Hubbell	R	OH-08	March 4, 1865	1st term	Left the House in 1867.
135	James Humphrey	R	NY-03	March 4, 1865; Previous service, 1859–1861.	2nd term*	Died on June 16, 1866.
136	James M. Humphrey	D	NY-30	March 4, 1865	1st term	
137	Morgan Jones	D	NY-04	March 4, 1865	1st term	Left the House in 1867.
138	John R. Kelso	R	MO-04	March 4, 1865	1st term	Left the House in 1867.
139	Michael C. Kerr	D	IN-02	March 4, 1865	1st term	
140	Andrew J. Kuykendall	R	IL-13	March 4, 1865	1st term	Left the House in 1867.
141	John H. Ketcham	R	NY-12	March 4, 1865	1st term	
142	Addison H. Laflin	R	NY-20	March 4, 1865	1st term	
143	George R. Latham	U	WV-02	March 4, 1865	1st term	Left the House in 1867.
144	George Van Eman Lawrence	R	PA-24	March 4, 1865	1st term	
145	William Lawrence	R	OH-04	March 4, 1865	1st term	
146	John Lynch	R	ME-01	March 4, 1865	1st term	
147	Samuel S. Marshall	D	IL-11	March 4, 1865; Previous service, 1855–1859.	3rd term*	
148	Gilman Marston	R	NH-01	March 4, 1865; Previous service, 1859–1863.	3rd term*	Left the House in 1867.
149	Ulysses Mercur	R	PA-13	March 4, 1865	1st term	
150	Hiram McCullough	D	MD-01	March 4, 1865	1st term	
151	Samuel McKee	UU	KY-09	March 4, 1865	1st term	Left the House in 1867.
152	Donald C. McRuer	R	CA-01	March 4, 1865	1st term	Left the House in 1867.
153	George F. Miller	R	PA-14	March 4, 1865	1st term	
154	Samuel W. Moulton	R	IL	March 4, 1865	1st term	Left the House in 1867.
155	William A. Newell	R	NJ-02	March 4, 1865; Previous service, 1847–1851.	3rd term*	Left the House in 1867.
156	William E. Niblack	D	IN-01	March 4, 1865; Previous service, 1857–1861.	3rd term*	
157	John A. Nicholson	D	DE	March 4, 1865	1st term	
158	Thomas E. Noell	R	MO-03	March 4, 1865	1st term	
159	Halbert E. Paine	R	WI-01	March 4, 1865	1st term	
160	Charles E. Phelps	UU	MD-03	March 4, 1865	1st term	
161	Tobias A. Plants	R	OH-15	March 4, 1865	1st term	
162	Henry J. Raymond	R	NY-06	March 4, 1865	1st term	Left the House in 1867.
163	Burwell C. Ritter	D	KY-02	March 4, 1865	1st term	Left the House in 1867.
164	Lovell Rousseau	UU	KY-05	March 4, 1865	1st term	Resigned on July 21, 1866. Returned to the House on December 3, 1866. Left the House in 1867.
165	Philetus Sawyer	R	WI-05	March 4, 1865	1st term	
166	George S. Shanklin	D	KY-07	March 4, 1865	1st term	Left the House in 1867.
167	Samuel Shellabarger	R	OH-07	March 4, 1865; Previous service, 1861–1863.	2nd term*	
168	Charles Sitgreaves	D	NJ-03	March 4, 1865	1st term	
169	Thomas N. Stilwell	R	IN-11	March 4, 1865	1st term	Left the House in 1867.
170	Stephen Taber	D	NY-01	March 4, 1865	1st term	
171	Nelson Taylor	D	NY-05	March 4, 1865	1st term	Left the House in 1867.
172	Anthony Thornton	D	IL-10	March 4, 1865	1st term	Left the House in 1867.
173	Lawrence S. Trimble	D	KY-01	March 4, 1865	1st term	
174	Rowland E. Trowbridge	R	MI-05	March 4, 1865; Previous service, 1861–1863.	2nd term*	
175	Henry Van Aernam	R	NY-31	March 4, 1865	1st term	
176	Burt Van Horn	R	NY-29	March 4, 1865; Previous service, 1861–1863.	2nd term*	
177	Robert T. Van Horn	R	MO-06	March 4, 1865	1st term	
178	Hamilton Ward, Sr.	R	NY-27	March 4, 1865	1st term	
179	Samuel L. Warner	R	CT-02	March 4, 1865	1st term	Left the House in 1867.
180	Martin Welker	R	OH-14	March 4, 1865	1st term	
181	John Wentworth	R	IL-01	March 4, 1865; Previous service, 1843–1851 and 1853–1855.	6th term**	Left the House in 1867.
182	Stephen F. Wilson	R	PA-18	March 4, 1865	1st term	
183	Edwin R. V. Wright	D	NJ-05	March 4, 1865	1st term	Left the House in 1867.
	Nathaniel P. Banks	R	MA-06	December 4, 1865; Previous service, 1853–1857.	4th term*	
	Isaac R. Hawkins	U	TN-07	December 4, 1865	1st term	
	John Lewis Thomas Jr.	D	MD-02	December 4, 1865	1st term	Left the House in 1867.
	Alexander Hamilton Coffroth	D	PA-16	February 19, 1866; Previous service, 1863–1865.	2nd term*	Resigned on July 18, 1866.
	Henry D. Washburn	R	IN-07	February 23, 1866	1st term	
	William E. Dodge	R	NY-08	April 7, 1866	1st term	Left the House in 1867.
	William Henry Koontz	R	PA-16	July 18, 1866	1st term	
	Samuel M. Arnell	UU	TN-06	July 24, 1866	1st term	
	William B. Campbell	U	TN-05	July 24, 1866; Previous service, 1837–1843.	4th term*	Left the House in 1867.
	Edmund Cooper	U	TN-04	July 24, 1866	1st term	Left the House in 1867.
	John W. Leftwich	UU	TN-08	July 24, 1866	1st term	Left the House in 1867.
	Horace Maynard	UU	TN-02	July 24, 1866; Previous service, 1857–1863.	4th term*	
	William Brickly Stokes	UU	TN-03	July 24, 1866; Previous service, 1859–1861.	2nd term*	
	Nathaniel G. Taylor	U	TN-01	July 24, 1866; Previous service, 1854–1855.	2nd term*	Left the House in 1867.
	Elijah Hise	D	KY-03	December 3, 1866	1st term	
	Andrew H. Ward	D	KY-06	December 3, 1866	1st term	Left the House in 1867.
	Robert S. Hale	R	NY-16	December 4, 1866	1st term	Left the House in 1867.
	John W. Hunter	D	NY-03	December 4, 1866	1st term	Left the House in 1867.
	Turner M. Marquett	R	NE-01	March 2, 1867	1st term	Left the House in 1867.

== Delegates ==
Rank	Delegate	Party	District	Seniority date (Previous service, if any)	No.# of term(s)	Notes
1	Samuel McLean	D	MT	January 6, 1865	2nd term	
2	Allen Alexander Bradford	R	CO	March 4, 1865	1st term	
3	Walter A. Burleigh	R	DAK	March 4, 1865	1st term	
4	José Francisco Chaves	R	NM	March 4, 1865	1st term	
5	Phineas Hitchcock	R	NE	March 4, 1865	1st term	
6	Edward Dexter Holbrook	D	ID	March 4, 1865	1st term	
7	William Henry Hooper	D	UT	March 4, 1865; Previous service, 1859–1861.	2nd term*	
8	Arthur A. Denny	R	WA	March 4, 1865	1st term	
	John Noble Goodwin	R	AZ	January 17, 1866; Previous service, 1861–1863.	2nd term*	

== See also ==
- 39th United States Congress
- List of United States congressional districts
- List of United States senators in the 39th Congress
