= 39th United States Congress =

Branch of the US government, 1865–1867

←	38th	40th	→
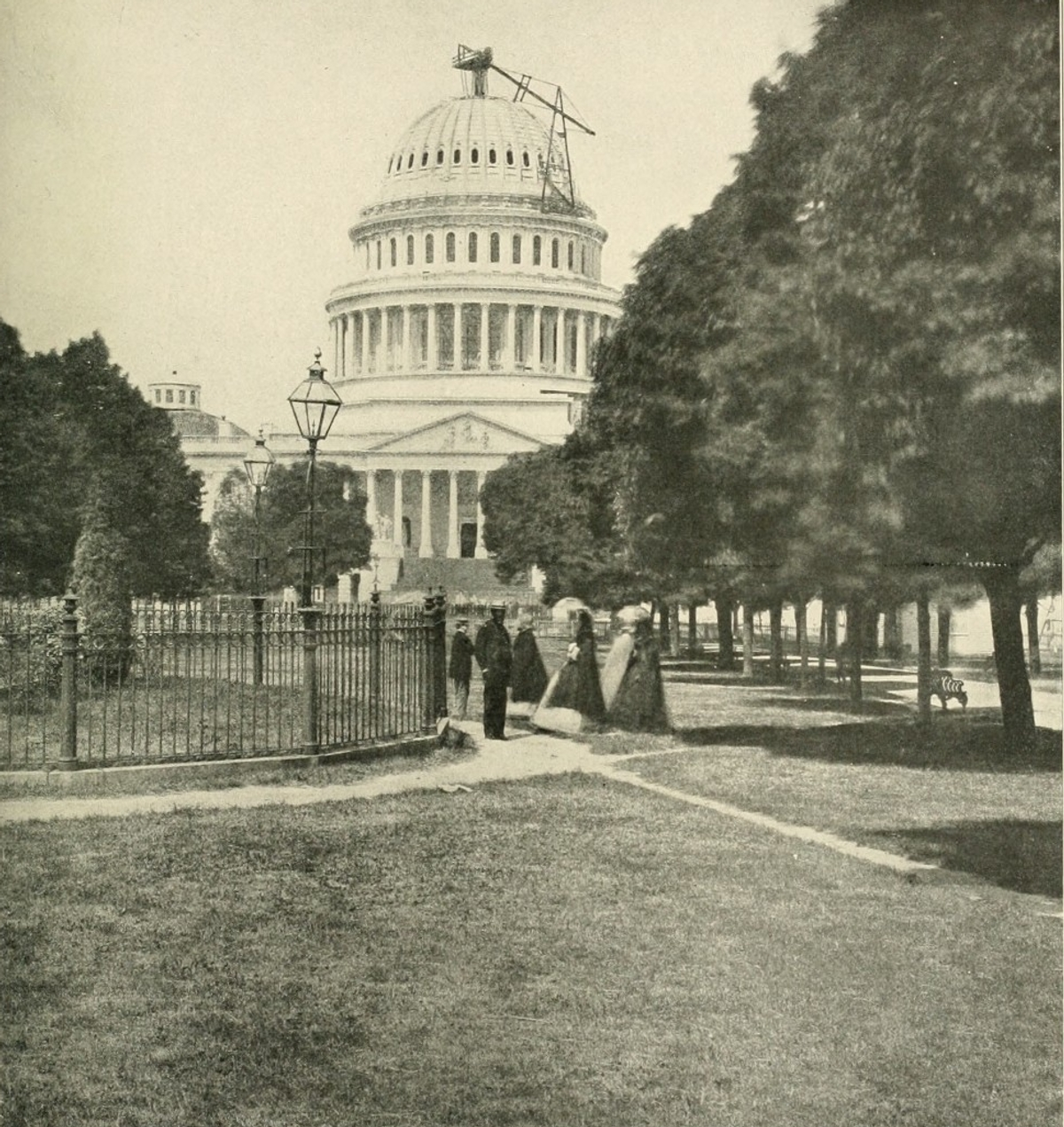
- United States Capitol (1863)

Overview
- Legislative body: United States Congress
- Jurisdiction: United States
- Term: March 4, 1865 – March 4, 1867

Senate
- Members: 54
- President: Andrew Johnson (D/NU) (Note: Andrew Johnson, a former War Democrat, was elected Vice President (and became President of the Senate) through the Republican-affiliated “National Union” party.) (until April 15, 1865); Vacant (from April 15, 1865)
- President pro tempore: Lafayette S. Foster (R); Benjamin Wade (R)
- Party control: Republican

House of Representatives
- Members: 193 representatives 9 non-voting delegates
- Speaker: Schuyler Colfax (R)
- Party control: Republican

Sessions
- Special (Note: Special session of the Senate.): March 4, 1865 – March 11, 1865
- 1st: December 4, 1865 – July 28, 1866
- 2nd: December 3, 1866 – March 4, 1867

The 39th United States Congress was a meeting of the legislative branch of the United States federal government, consisting of the United States Senate and the United States House of Representatives. It met in Washington, D.C., from March 4, 1865, to March 4, 1867, during Abraham Lincoln's final month as president, and the first two years of the administration of his successor, Andrew Johnson.

The apportionment of seats in this House of Representatives was based on the 1860 United States census. Both chambers had a Republican majority.

== Major events ==
- March 4, 1865: Second inauguration of President Abraham Lincoln.
- April 9, 1865: Surrender of Confederate forces at Appomattox Court House, effectively ending the American Civil War
- April 15, 1865: Assassination of President Abraham Lincoln, Vice President Andrew Johnson became President of the United States
- December 11, 1865: Creation of the House Appropriations Committee and the House Banking and Commerce Committee, reducing the tasks of the House Ways and Means Committee
- January, 1866: The second and current United States Capitol dome completed after 11 years of work.
- July 24, 1866: Tennessee became the first U.S. state to be readmitted to the Union following the American Civil War.
- November 5, 1866: United States House of Representatives elections, 1866
- January 8, 1867: African American men are granted the right to vote in the District of Columbia

== Major legislation ==
- April 9, 1866: Civil Rights Act of 1866, Sess. 1, ch. 31, 14 Stat. 27
- July 16, 1866: Freedmen's Bureau Bill, Sess. 1, ch. 200, 14 Stat. 173
- July 23, 1866: Judicial Circuits Act, Sess. 1, ch. 210, 14 Stat. 209, reduced the number of United States circuit courts to nine and the number of Supreme Court justices to seven
- July 23, 1866: District of Columbia Public Schools Act ("An Act relating to Public Schools in the District of Columbia"), Sess. 1, ch. 217, 14 Stat. 216
- July 25, 1866: An Act to revive the grade of General in the United States Army, Sess. 1, ch. 232, 14 Stat. 223, (now called "4-star general"); Lieutenant General Ulysses S. Grant became the first to have this rank.
- July 28, 1866: Metric Act of 1866, Sess. 1, ch. 301, 14 Stat. 339, legalized the use of the metric system for weights and measures in the United States.
- July 28, 1866: Washington City Colored Schools Lots Donation Act ("An Act donating certain Lots in the City of Washington for Schools for Colored Children in the District of Columbia"), Sess. 1, ch. 308, 14 Stat. 343
- March 2, 1867: Reconstruction Act, ch. 153, 14 Stat. 428 established five military districts, each headed by a general, in ten states of the former Confederate South (Tennessee excepted), and stipulates conditions for re-admission of these States into the Union.
- March 2, 1867: Tenure of Office Act, ch. 154, 14 Stat. 430 required the president to obtain the Senate's advice and consent to suspend or dismiss certain federal public officials (notably cabinet officers). Violation of this act will lead to the impeachment of Andrew Johnson by the next (40th) Congress in 1868.

== Constitutional amendments ==
- December 18, 1865: Thirteenth Amendment to the United States Constitution declared ratified
- June 13, 1866: Approved an amendment to the Constitution addressing citizenship rights and equal protection of the laws, and submitted it to the state legislatures for ratification
  - Amendment was later ratified on July 9, 1868, becoming the Fourteenth Amendment to the United States Constitution

== States admitted ==
- July 24, 1866: Tennessee readmitted to representation.
- March 1, 1867: Nebraska admitted as the 37th state, sess. 2, ch. 36, 14 Stat. 391 (over president's veto)

== Party summary ==
The count below identifies party affiliations at the beginning of the first session of this Congress, and includes members from vacancies and newly admitted states, when they were first seated. Changes resulting from subsequent replacements are shown below in the "Changes in membership" section.

=== Senate ===
During this Congress, two seats were added for the new state of Nebraska.

	Party (shading shows control)				Total	Vacant
	Democratic (D)	Republican (R)	Unionist (U)	Unconditional Unionist (UU)	Total	Vacant
End of previous congress	10	33	3	4	50	22
Begin	9	37	1	1	48	24
End	8	41	3	2	54	20
Final voting share	14.8%	75.9%	5.6%	3.7%		
Beginning of next congress	8	45	0	0	53	21

=== House of Representatives ===
During this Congress, one seat was added for the new state of Nebraska.

	Party (shading shows control)						Total	Vacant
	Democratic (D)	Republican (R)	Independent Republican (IR)	Unionist (U)	Unconditional Unionist (UU)	Other	Total	Vacant
End of previous congress	72	84	2	9	16	0	183	56
Begin	40	132	1	0	10	0	183	59
End	39	135	1	4	13	0	192	51
Final voting share	20.3%	70.3%	0.5%	2.1%	6.8%	0.0%		
Beginning of next congress	45	140	1	0	0	2 (Note: Conservative & Conservative Republican)	188	55

== Leadership ==
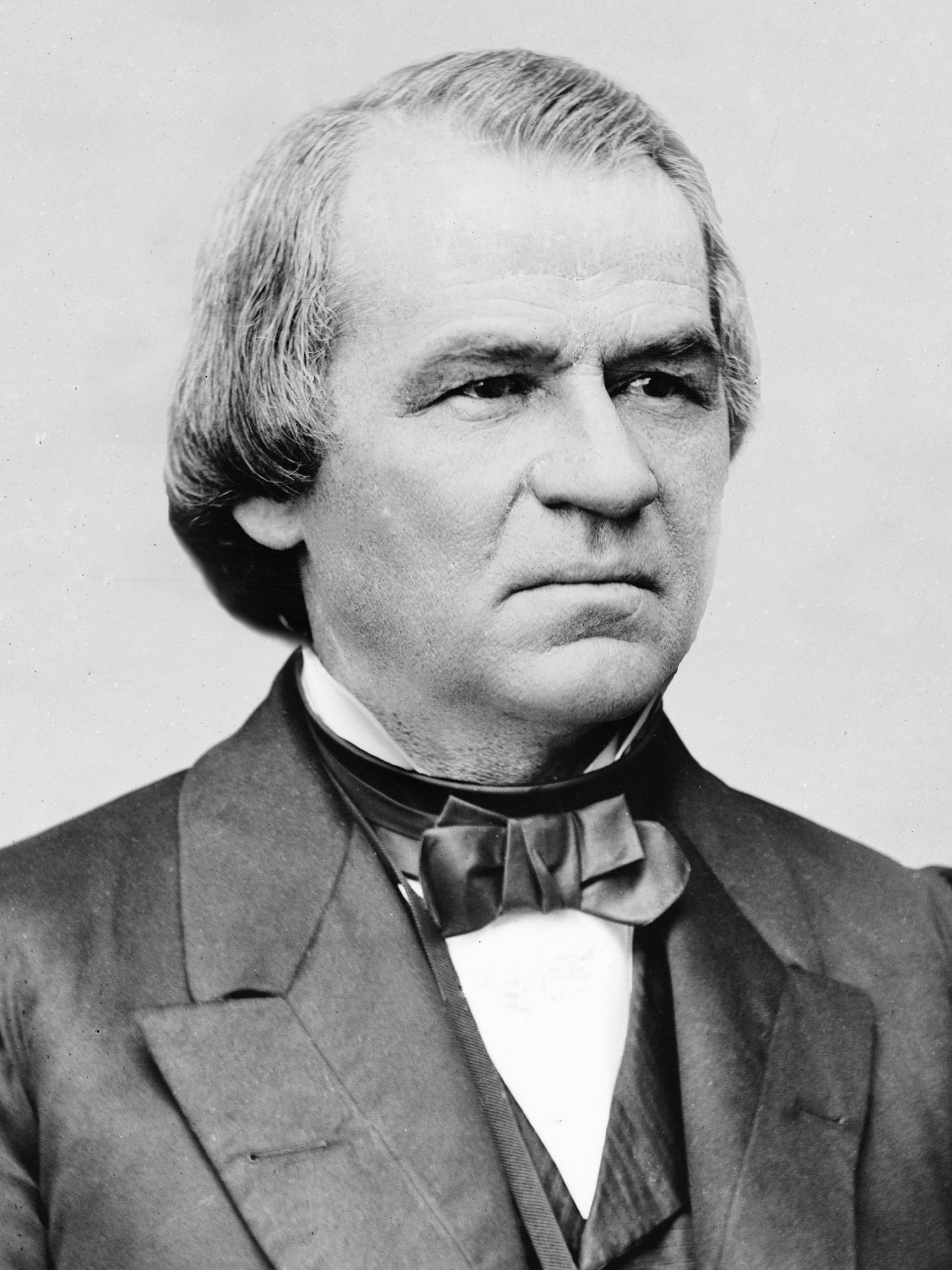
President of the Senate Andrew Johnson, until April 15, 1865

=== Senate ===
- President: Andrew Johnson (D), until April 15, 1865; vacant thereafter.
- President pro tempore: Lafayette S. Foster (R), until March 2, 1867
  - Benjamin F. Wade (R), elected March 2, 1867
- Republican Conference Chairman: Henry B. Anthony

=== House of Representatives ===
- Speaker: Schuyler Colfax (R)
- Republican Conference Chairman: Justin S. Morrill

== Members ==
Senators' party membership by state at the opening of the 39th Congress in March 1865. Green stripes represent Unionists and gray stripes represent Unconditional Unionists. The senators from Nebraska and Tennessee were not seated until later in the Congress. 2 Democrats 1 Democrat and 1 Republican 2 Republicans 2 Unionists Territories

This list is arranged by chamber, then by state. Senators are listed in order of seniority, and representatives are listed by district.

=== Senate ===
Senators were elected by the state legislatures every two years, with one-third beginning new six-year terms with each Congress. Preceding the names in the list below are Senate class numbers, which indicate the cycle of their election. In this Congress, Class 1 meant their term began in the last Congress, requiring reelection in 1868; Class 2 meant their term began in this Congress, requiring reelection in 1870; and Class 3 meant their term ended in this Congress, requiring reelection in 1866.

Skip to House of Representatives, below

==== Alabama ====
2. Vacant
3. Vacant

==== Arkansas ====
2. Vacant
3. Vacant

==== California ====
▌1. John Conness (R)
▌3. James A. McDougall (D)

==== Connecticut ====
▌1. James Dixon (R)
▌3. Lafayette S. Foster (R)

==== Delaware ====
▌1. George R. Riddle (D)
▌2. Willard Saulsbury Sr. (D)

==== Florida ====
1. Vacant
3. Vacant

==== Georgia ====
2. Vacant
3. Vacant

==== Illinois ====
▌2. Richard Yates (R)
▌3. Lyman Trumbull (R)

==== Indiana ====
▌1. Thomas A. Hendricks (D)
▌3. Henry S. Lane (R)

==== Iowa ====
▌2. James W. Grimes (R)
▌3. James Harlan (R), until May 15, 1865

▌Samuel J. Kirkwood (R), from January 13, 1866

==== Kansas ====
▌2. Jim Lane (R), until July 11, 1866

▌Edmund G. Ross (R), from July 19, 1866

▌3. Samuel C. Pomeroy (R)

==== Kentucky ====
▌2. James Guthrie (D)
▌3. Garrett Davis (U)

==== Louisiana ====
2. Vacant
3. Vacant

==== Maine ====
▌1. Lot M. Morrill (R)
▌2. William P. Fessenden (R)

==== Maryland ====
▌1. Reverdy Johnson (D)
▌3. John A. J. Creswell (UU), from March 9, 1865

==== Massachusetts ====
▌1. Charles Sumner (R)
▌2. Henry Wilson (R)

==== Michigan ====
▌1. Zachariah Chandler (R)
▌2. Jacob M. Howard (R)

==== Minnesota ====
▌1. Alexander Ramsey (R)
▌2. Daniel S. Norton (R)

==== Mississippi ====
1. Vacant
2. Vacant

==== Missouri ====
▌1. John B. Henderson (R)
▌3. B. Gratz Brown (R)

==== Nebraska ====
▌1. Thomas Tipton (R), from March 1, 1867 (newly admitted state)
▌2. John M. Thayer (R), from March 1, 1867 (newly admitted state)

==== Nevada ====
▌1. William M. Stewart (R)
▌3. James W. Nye (R)

==== New Hampshire ====
▌2. Aaron H. Cragin (R)
▌3. Daniel Clark (R), until July 27, 1866

▌George G. Fogg (R), from August 31, 1866

==== New Jersey ====
▌1. William Wright (D), until November 1, 1866

▌Frederick T. Frelinghuysen (R), from November 12, 1866

▌2. John P. Stockton (D), March 15, 1865 – March 27, 1866

▌Alexander G. Cattell (R), from September 19, 1866

==== New York ====
▌3. Ira Harris (R)
▌1. Edwin D. Morgan (R)

==== North Carolina ====
2. Vacant
3. Vacant

==== Ohio ====
▌1. Benjamin Wade (R)
▌3. John Sherman (R)

==== Oregon ====
▌2. George H. Williams (R)
▌3. James W. Nesmith (D)

==== Pennsylvania ====
▌1. Charles R. Buckalew (D)
▌3. Edgar Cowan (R)

==== Rhode Island ====
▌1. William Sprague IV (R)
▌2. Henry B. Anthony (R)

==== South Carolina ====
2. Vacant
3. Vacant

==== Tennessee ====
▌1. David T. Patterson (U), from July 28, 1866
▌2. Joseph S. Fowler (U), from July 24, 1866

==== Texas ====
1. Vacant
2. Vacant

==== Vermont ====
▌1. Solomon Foot (R), until March 28, 1866

▌George F. Edmunds (R), from April 3, 1866

▌3. Jacob Collamer (R), until November 9, 1865

▌Luke P. Poland (R), from November 21, 1865

==== Virginia ====
1. Vacant
2. Vacant

==== West Virginia ====
▌1. Peter G. Van Winkle (UU)
▌2. Waitman T. Willey (R)

==== Wisconsin ====
▌1. James R. Doolittle (R)
▌3. Timothy O. Howe (R)

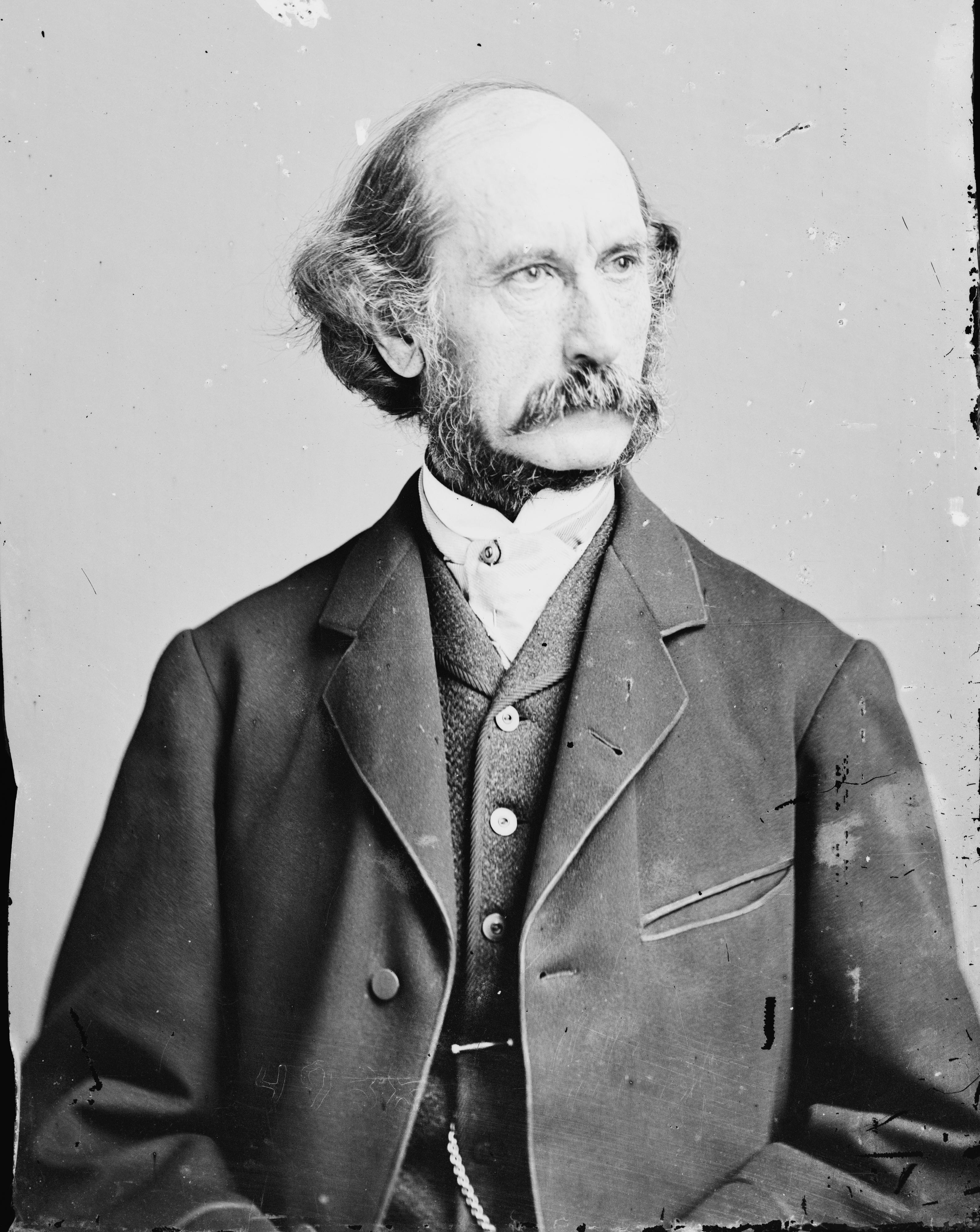
Senate President pro tempore Lafayette S. Foster, until March 2, 1867

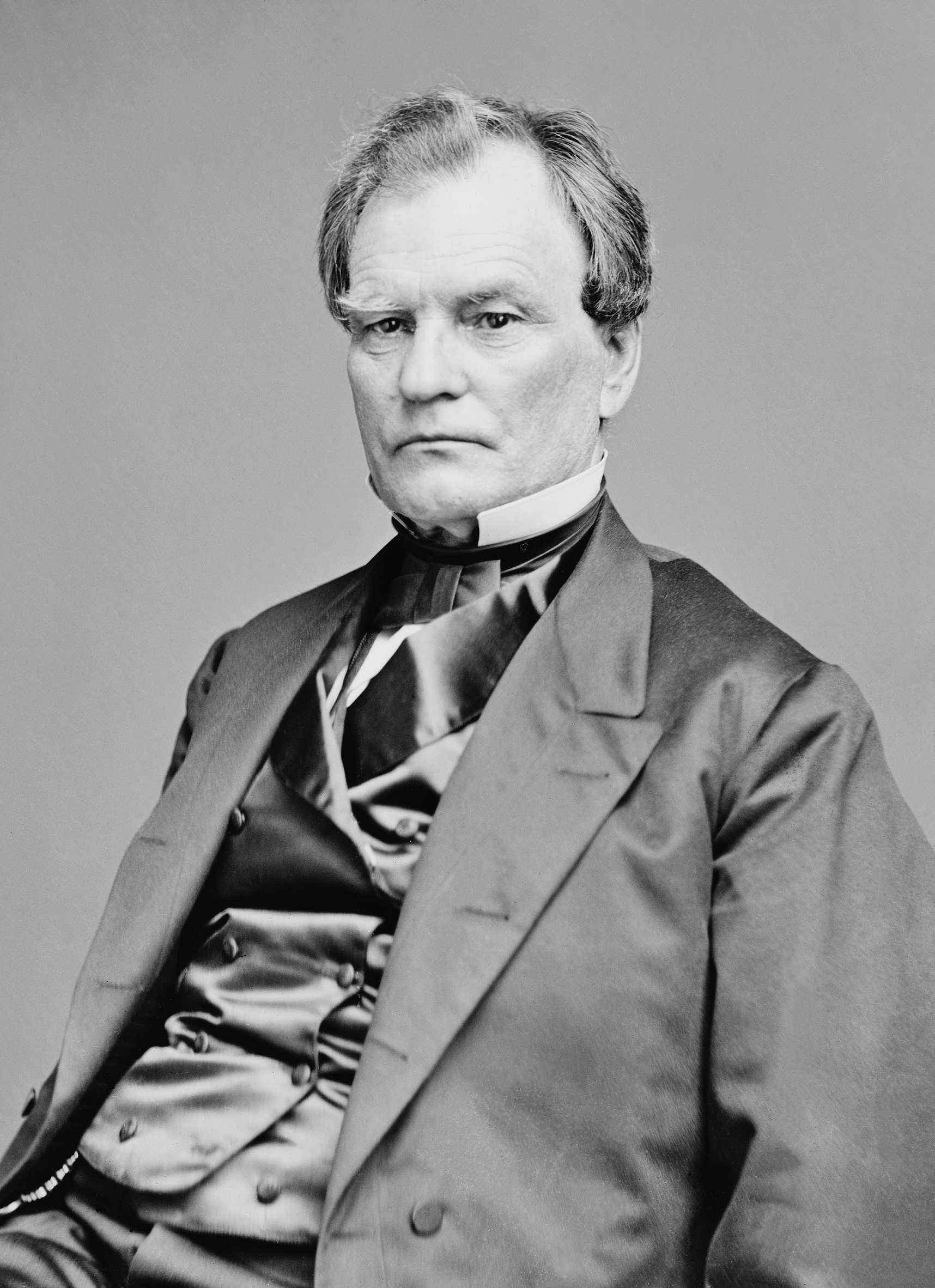
Senate President pro tempore Benjamin Wade, from March 2, 1867

=== House of Representatives ===
The names of representatives are preceded by their district numbers.

==== Alabama ====
1. Vacant
2. Vacant
3. Vacant
4. Vacant
5. Vacant
6. Vacant

==== Arkansas ====
1. Vacant
2. Vacant
3. Vacant

==== California ====
(3 Republicans)

▌1. Donald C. McRuer (R)
▌2. William Higby (R)
▌3. John Bidwell (R)

==== Connecticut ====
(4 Republicans)

▌1. Henry C. Deming (R)
▌2. Samuel L. Warner (R)
▌3. Augustus Brandegee (R)
▌4. John H. Hubbard (R)

==== Delaware ====
(1 Democrat)

▌At-large. John A. Nicholson (D)

==== Florida ====
At-large. Vacant

==== Georgia ====
1. Vacant
2. Vacant
3. Vacant
4. Vacant
5. Vacant
6. Vacant
7. Vacant

==== Illinois ====
(11–3 Republican)

▌1. John Wentworth (R)
▌2. John F. Farnsworth (R)
▌3. Elihu B. Washburne (R)
▌4. Abner C. Harding (R)
▌5. Ebon C. Ingersoll (R)
▌6. Burton C. Cook (R)
▌7. Henry P. H. Bromwell (R)
▌8. Shelby M. Cullom (R)
▌9. Lewis Winans Ross (D)
▌10. Anthony Thornton (D)
▌11. Samuel S. Marshall (D)
▌12. Jehu Baker (R)
▌13. Andrew J. Kuykendall (R)
▌At-large. Samuel W. Moulton (R)

==== Indiana ====
(8–3 Republican)

▌1. William E. Niblack (D)
▌2. Michael C. Kerr (D)
▌3. Ralph Hill (R)
▌4. John H. Farquhar (R)
▌5. George W. Julian (R)
▌6. Ebenezer Dumont (R)
▌7. Daniel W. Voorhees (D), until February 23, 1866

▌Henry D. Washburn (R), from February 23, 1866

▌8. Godlove S. Orth (R)
▌9. Schuyler Colfax (R)
▌10. Joseph H. Defrees (R)
▌11. Thomas N. Stilwell (R)

==== Iowa ====
(6 Republicans)

▌1. James F. Wilson (R)
▌2. Hiram Price (R)
▌3. William B. Allison (R)
▌4. Josiah B. Grinnell (R)
▌5. John A. Kasson (R)
▌6. Asahel W. Hubbard (R)

==== Kansas ====
(1 Republican)

▌At-large. Sidney Clarke (R)

==== Kentucky ====
(4–5 Democratic)

▌1. Lawrence S. Trimble (D)
▌2. Burwell C. Ritter (D)
▌3. Henry Grider (D), until September 7, 1866

▌Elijah Hise (D), from December 3, 1866

▌4. Aaron Harding (D)
▌5. Lovell H. Rousseau (UU), until July 21, 1866, and from December 3, 1866
▌6. Green C. Smith (UU), until July ??, 1866

▌Andrew H. Ward (D), from December 3, 1866

▌7. George S. Shanklin (D)
▌8. William H. Randall (UU)
▌9. Samuel McKee (UU)

==== Louisiana ====
1. Vacant
2. Vacant
3. Vacant
4. Vacant
5. Vacant

==== Maine ====
(5 Republicans)

▌1. John Lynch (R)
▌2. Sidney Perham (R)
▌3. James G. Blaine (R)
▌4. John H. Rice (R)
▌5. Frederick A. Pike (R)

==== Maryland ====
(3–2 Unconditional Unionist)

▌1. Hiram McCullough (D)
▌2. Edwin H. Webster (UU), until July ??, 1865

▌John L. Thomas Jr. (UU), from December 4, 1865

▌3. Charles E. Phelps (UU)
▌4. Francis Thomas (UU)
▌5. Benjamin G. Harris (D)

==== Massachusetts ====
(10 Republicans)

▌1. Thomas D. Eliot (R)
▌2. Oakes Ames (R)
▌3. Alexander H. Rice (R)
▌4. Samuel Hooper (R)
▌5. John B. Alley (R)
▌6. Daniel W. Gooch (R), until September 1, 1865

▌Nathaniel P. Banks (R), from December 4, 1865

▌7. George S. Boutwell (R)
▌8. John D. Baldwin (R)
▌9. William B. Washburn (R)
▌10. Henry L. Dawes (R)

==== Michigan ====
(6 Republicans)

▌1. Fernando C. Beaman (R)
▌2. Charles Upson (R)
▌3. John W. Longyear (R)
▌4. Thomas W. Ferry (R)
▌5. Rowland E. Trowbridge (R)
▌6. John F. Driggs (R)

==== Minnesota ====
(2 Republicans)

▌1. William Windom (R)
▌2. Ignatius L. Donnelly (R)

==== Mississippi ====
1. Vacant
2. Vacant
3. Vacant
4. Vacant
5. Vacant

==== Missouri ====
(8–1 Republican)

▌1. John Hogan (D)
▌2. Henry T. Blow (R)
▌3. Thomas E. Noell (R)
▌4. John R. Kelso (IR)
▌5. Joseph W. McClurg (R)
▌6. Robert T. Van Horn (R)
▌7. Benjamin F. Loan (R)
▌8. John F. Benjamin (R)
▌9. George W. Anderson (R)

==== Nebraska ====
(1 Republican)

▌At-large. Turner M. Marquette (R), from March 2, 1867 (newly admitted state)

==== Nevada ====
(1 Republican)

▌At-large. Delos R. Ashley (R)

==== New Hampshire ====
(3 Republicans)

▌1. Gilman Marston (R)
▌2. Edward H. Rollins (R)
▌3. James W. Patterson (R)

==== New Jersey ====
(3–2 Democratic)

▌1. John F. Starr (R)
▌2. William A. Newell (R)
▌3. Charles Sitgreaves (D)
▌4. Andrew J. Rogers (D)
▌5. Edwin R. V. Wright (D)

==== New York ====
(20–11 Republican)

▌1. Stephen Taber (D)
▌2. Teunis G. Bergen (D)
▌3. James Humphrey (R), until June 16, 1866

▌John W. Hunter (D), from December 4, 1866

▌4. Morgan Jones (D)
▌5. Nelson Taylor (D)
▌6. Henry J. Raymond (R)
▌7. John W. Chanler (D)
▌8. James Brooks (D), until April 7, 1866

▌William E. Dodge (R), from April 7, 1866

▌9. William A. Darling (R)
▌10. William Radford (D)
▌11. Charles H. Winfield (D)
▌12. John H. Ketcham (R)
▌13. Edwin N. Hubbell (D)
▌14. Charles Goodyear (D)
▌15. John Augustus Griswold (R)
▌16. Orlando Kellogg (R), until August 24, 1865

▌Robert S. Hale (R), from December 3, 1865

▌17. Calvin T. Hulburd (R)
▌18. James M. Marvin (R)
▌19. Demas Hubbard Jr. (R)
▌20. Addison H. Laflin (R)
▌21. Roscoe Conkling (R)
▌22. Sidney T. Holmes (R)
▌23. Thomas T. Davis (R)
▌24. Theodore M. Pomeroy (R)
▌25. Daniel Morris (R)
▌26. Giles W. Hotchkiss (R)
▌27. Hamilton Ward Sr. (R)
▌28. Roswell Hart (R)
▌29. Burt Van Horn (R)
▌30. James M. Humphrey (D)
▌31. Henry H. Van Aernam (R)

==== North Carolina ====
1. Vacant
2. Vacant
3. Vacant
4. Vacant
5. Vacant
6. Vacant
7. Vacant

==== Ohio ====
(17–2 Republican)

▌1. Benjamin Eggleston (R)
▌2. Rutherford B. Hayes (R)
▌3. Robert C. Schenck (R)
▌4. William Lawrence (R)
▌5. Francis C. Le Blond (D)
▌6. Reader W. Clarke (R)
▌7. Samuel Shellabarger (R)
▌8. James R. Hubbell (R)
▌9. Ralph P. Buckland (R)
▌10. James M. Ashley (R)
▌11. Hezekiah S. Bundy (R)
▌12. William E. Finck (D)
▌13. Columbus Delano (R)
▌14. Martin Welker (R)
▌15. Tobias A. Plants (R)
▌16. John Bingham (R)
▌17. Ephraim R. Eckley (R)
▌18. Rufus P. Spalding (R)
▌19. James A. Garfield (R)

==== Oregon ====
(1 Republican)

▌At-large. James H. D. Henderson (R)

==== Pennsylvania ====
(15–9 Republican)

▌1. Samuel J. Randall (D)
▌2. Charles O'Neill (R)
▌3. Leonard Myers (R)
▌4. William D. Kelley (R)
▌5. M. Russell Thayer (R)
▌6. Benjamin M. Boyer (D)
▌7. John M. Broomall (R)
▌8. Sydenham E. Ancona (D)
▌9. Thaddeus Stevens (R)
▌10. Myer Strouse (D)
▌11. Philip Johnson (D), until January 29, 1867
▌12. Charles Denison (D)
▌13. Ulysses Mercur (R)
▌14. George F. Miller (R)
▌15. Adam J. Glossbrenner (D)
▌16. Alexander H. Coffroth (D), February 19, 1866 – July 18, 1866

▌William H. Koontz (R), from July 18, 1866

▌17. Abraham A. Barker (R)
▌18. Stephen F. Wilson (R)
▌19. Glenni W. Scofield (R)
▌20. Charles V. Culver (R)
▌21. John L. Dawson (D)
▌22. James K. Moorhead (R)
▌23. Thomas Williams (R)
▌24. George V. Lawrence (R)

==== Rhode Island ====
(2 Republicans)

▌1. Thomas A. Jenckes (R)
▌2. Nathan F. Dixon Jr. (R)

==== South Carolina ====
1. Vacant
2. Vacant
3. Vacant
4. Vacant

==== Tennessee ====
(4 Unconditional Unionists; 4 Unionists)

▌1. Nathaniel G. Taylor (U), from July 24, 1866
▌2. Horace Maynard (UU), from July 24, 1866
▌3. William B. Stokes (UU), from July 24, 1866
▌4. Edmund Cooper (U), from July 24, 1866
▌5. William B. Campbell (U), from July 24, 1866
▌6. Samuel M. Arnell (UU), from July 24, 1866
▌7. Isaac R. Hawkins (U), from July 24, 1866
▌8. John W. Leftwich (UU), from July 24, 1866

==== Texas ====
1. Vacant
2. Vacant
3. Vacant
4. Vacant

==== Vermont ====
(3 Republicans)

▌1. Frederick E. Woodbridge (R)
▌2. Justin S. Morrill (R)
▌3. Portus Baxter (R)

==== Virginia ====
1. Vacant
2. Vacant
3. Vacant
4. Vacant
5. Vacant
6. Vacant
7. Vacant
8. Vacant

==== West Virginia ====
(3 Unconditional Unionists)

▌1. Chester D. Hubbard (UU)
▌2. George R. Latham (UU)
▌3. Kellian Whaley (UU)

==== Wisconsin ====
(5–1 Republican)

▌1. Halbert E. Paine (R)
▌2. Ithamar C. Sloan (R)
▌3. Amasa Cobb (R)
▌4. Charles A. Eldredge (D)
▌5. Philetus Sawyer (R)
▌6. Walter D. McIndoe (R)

==== Non-voting members ====
(6–3 Republican)

▌Arizona Territory. John N. Goodwin (R)
▌Colorado Territory. Allen A. Bradford (R)
▌Dakota Territory. Walter A. Burleigh (R)
▌Idaho Territory. Edward D. Holbrook (D)
▌Montana Territory. Samuel McLean (D)
▌Nebraska Territory. Phineas W. Hitchcock (R), until March 1, 1867
▌New Mexico Territory. J. Francisco Chaves (R)
▌Utah Territory. William H. Hooper (D)
▌Washington Territory. Arthur A. Denny (R)

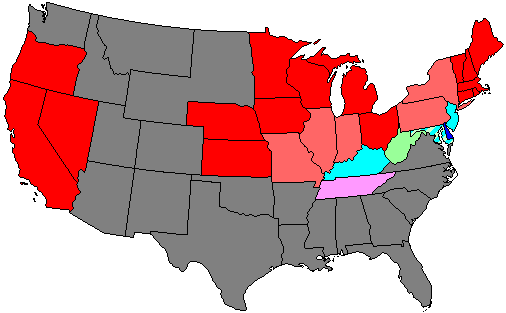
House seats by party holding plurality in state: 80.1–100% Democratic / 80.1–100% Republican; 60.1–80% Democratic / 60.1–80% Republican; Up to 60% Democratic / Up to 60% Republican

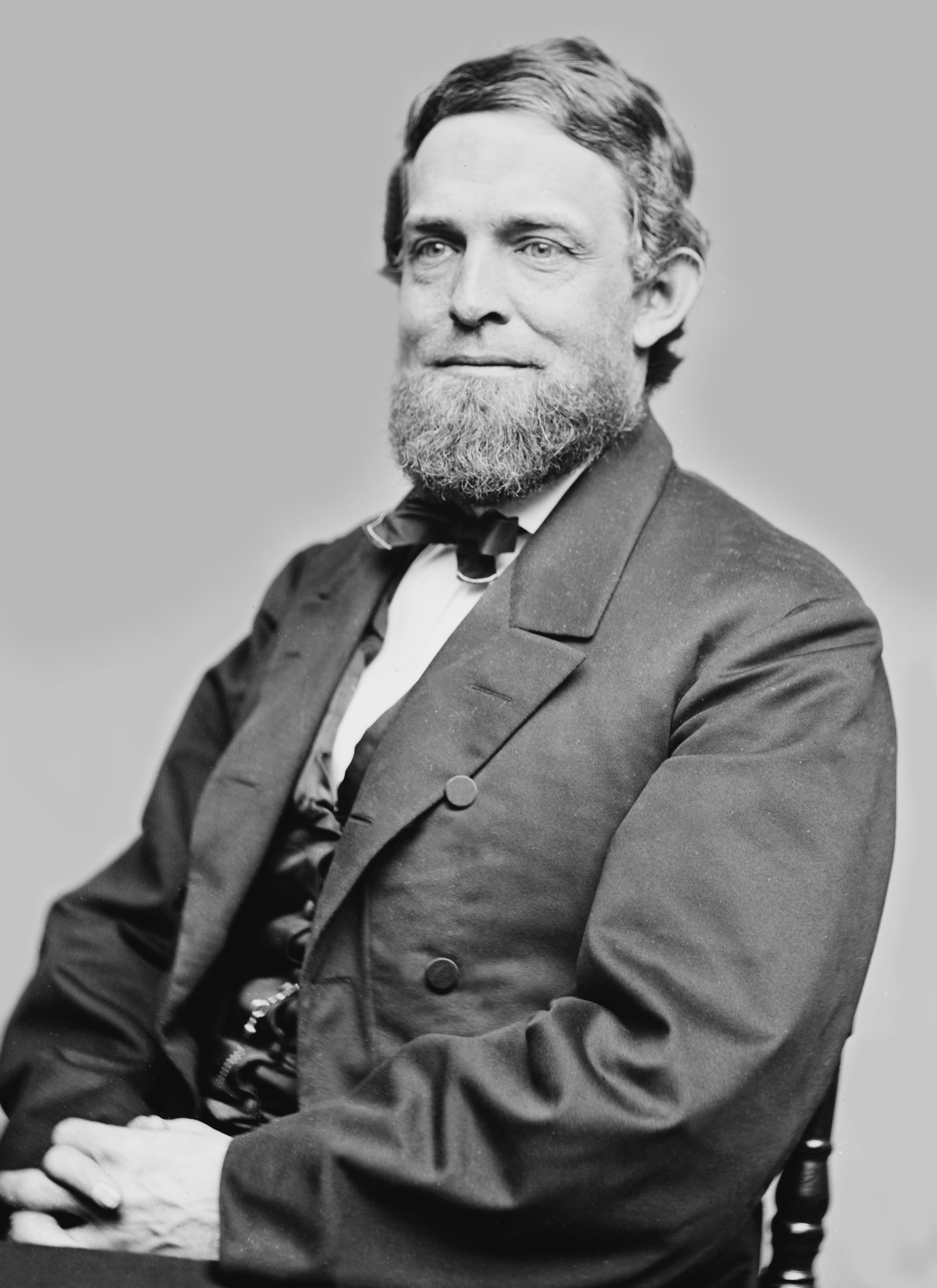
Speaker of the House Schuyler Colfax

== Changes in membership ==
The count below reflects changes from the beginning of the first session of this Congress.

=== Senate ===
- Replacements: 8
  - Democratic: 2-seat net loss
  - Republican: 2-seat net gain
  - Unionist: no net change
  - Unconditional Union: no net change
- Deaths: 4
- Resignations: 2
- Vacancy: 1
- Seats of newly admitted states: 2
- Seats of re-admitted states: 2
- Total seats with changes: 12

Senate changes
State (class)	Vacated by	Reason for change	Successor	Date of successor's formal installation (Note: When seated or oath administered, not necessarily when service began.)
Maryland (3)	Vacant	Sen. Thomas Hicks had died during previous congress. Successor elected March 9, 1865.	John Creswell (UU)	March 9, 1865
New Jersey (2)	Vacant	Although elected in time for this Congress, the Senator-elect was not seated until March 15, 1865. Senator was later removed in election dispute, see below.	John P. Stockton (D)	March 15, 1865
Tennessee (2)	Vacant	Tennessee re-admitted to the Union. Senators were elected July 24, 1866.	Joseph S. Fowler (U)	July 24, 1866
Tennessee (1)	Vacant	Tennessee re-admitted to the Union. Senators were elected July 24, 1866.	David T. Patterson (U)	July 28, 1866
Iowa (3)	James Harlan (R)	Resigned May 15, 1865, after being appointed U.S. Secretary of the Interior. Successor elected January 13, 1866.	Samuel J. Kirkwood (R)	January 13, 1866
Vermont (3)	Jacob Collamer (R)	Died November 9, 1865. Successor was appointed November 21, 1865, to continue the term. Appointee was elected October 24, 1866, to finish the term.	Luke P. Poland (R)	November 21, 1865
New Jersey (2)	John P. Stockton (D)	Disputed election led to Senate vacating the seat March 27, 1866. Successor elected September 19, 1866.	Alexander G. Cattell (R)	September 19, 1866
Vermont (1)	Solomon Foot (R)	Died March 28, 1866. Successor was appointed April 3, 1866, to continue the term. Appointee was elected October 24, 1866, to finish the term.	George F. Edmunds (R)	April 3, 1866
Kansas (2)	Jim Lane (R)	Died July 11, 1866, after being mortally wounded from a self-inflicted gunshot 10 days earlier Successor was appointed July 19, 1866, to continue the term. Appointee was elected January 23, 1867, to finish the term.	Edmund G. Ross (R)	July 19, 1866
New Hampshire (3)	Daniel Clark (R)	Resigned July 27, 1866, after being appointed Judge of the U.S. District Court for the District of New Hampshire. Successor was appointed August 31, 1866.	George G. Fogg (R)	August 31, 1866
New Jersey (1)	William Wright (D)	Died November 1, 1866. Successor was appointed November 12, 1866. Appointee was elected January 23, 1867, to finish the term.	Frederick T. Frelinghuysen (R)	November 12, 1866
Nebraska (1)	New seat	Nebraska admitted to the Union March 1, 1867.	Thomas Tipton (R)	March 1, 1867
Nebraska (2)	New seat	Nebraska admitted to the Union March 1, 1867.	John M. Thayer (R)	March 1, 1867

=== House of Representatives ===
- Replacements: 9
  - Democratic: 1-seat net gain
  - Republican: 2-seat net gain
  - Unconditional Unionist: 1 seat net loss
  - Unionist: 0 net change
- Deaths: 4
- Resignations: 4
- Contested election: 3
- Seats from newly admitted states: 1
- Seats from re-admitted states: 8
- Total seats with changes: 21

House changes
District	Vacated by	Reason for change	Successor	Date of successor's formal installation
Tennessee 1st	Vacant	Tennessee re-admitted into the Union	Nathaniel G. Taylor (U)	July 24, 1866
Tennessee 2nd	Vacant	Tennessee re-admitted into the Union	Horace Maynard (UU)	July 24, 1866
Tennessee 3rd	Vacant	Tennessee re-admitted into the Union	William B. Stokes (UU)	July 24, 1866
Tennessee 4th	Vacant	Tennessee re-admitted into the Union	Edmund Cooper (U)	July 24, 1866
Tennessee 5th	Vacant	Tennessee re-admitted into the Union	William B. Campbell (U)	July 24, 1866
Tennessee 6th	Vacant	Tennessee re-admitted into the Union	Samuel M. Arnell (UU)	July 24, 1866
Tennessee 7th	Vacant	Tennessee re-admitted into the Union	Isaac R. Hawkins (U)	July 24, 1866
Tennessee 8th	Vacant	Tennessee re-admitted into the Union	John W. Leftwich (UU)	July 24, 1866
Maryland 2nd	Edwin H. Webster (UU)	Resigned some time in July, 1865 after being appointed Collector of Customs for the port of Baltimore	John L. Thomas Jr. (UU)	December 4, 1865
New York 16th	Orlando Kellogg (R)	Died August 24, 1865	Robert S. Hale (R)	December 3, 1865
Massachusetts 6th	Daniel W. Gooch (R)	Resigned September 1, 1865, after being appointed Navy Agent for the port of Boston	Nathaniel P. Banks (R)	December 4, 1865
Pennsylvania 16th	Vacant	incumbent Coffroth prevented from taking seat due to election contest	Alexander H. Coffroth (D)	February 19, 1866
Pennsylvania 16th	Alexander H. Coffroth (D)	Lost contested election July 18, 1866	William H. Koontz (R)	July 18, 1866
Indiana 7th	Daniel W. Voorhees (D)	Lost contested election February 23, 1866	Henry D. Washburn (R)	February 23, 1866
New York 8th	James Brooks (D)	Lost contested election April 7, 1866	William E. Dodge (R)	April 7, 1866
New York 3rd	James Humphrey (R)	Died June 16, 1866	John W. Hunter (D)	December 4, 1866
Kentucky 6th	Green C. Smith (UU)	Resigned some time in July, 1866 after being appointed Governor of the Montana Territory.	Andrew H. Ward (D)	December 3, 1866
Kentucky 5th	Lovell Rousseau (UU)	Resigned July 21, 1866, after being reprimanded for his assault of Iowa Rep. Josiah B. Grinnell. Was re-elected to fill his own seat.	Lovell Rousseau (UU)	December 3, 1866
Kentucky 3rd	Henry Grider (D)	Died September 7, 1866	Elijah Hise (D)	December 3, 1866
Pennsylvania 11th	Philip Johnson (D)	Died January 29, 1867	Vacant	Not filled this term
Nebraska Territory At-large	Phineas Hitchcock (R)	Nebraska achieved statehood March 1, 1867	District eliminated	
Nebraska At-large	New State	Nebraska admitted to the Union March 1, 1867. Seat remained vacant until March 2, 1867	Turner M. Marquette (R)	March 2, 1867

== Committees ==
Lists of committees and their party leaders for members of the House and Senate committees can be found through the Official Congressional Directory at the bottom of this article. The directory after the pages of terms of service lists committees of the Senate, House (Standing with Subcommittees, Select and Special) and Joint and, after that, House/Senate committee assignments. On the committees section of the House and Senate in the Official Congressional Directory, the committee's members on the first row on the left side shows the chairman of the committee and on the right side shows the ranking member of the committee.

=== Senate ===
- Agriculture (Chairman: John Sherman)
- Audit and Control the Contingent Expenses of the Senate (Chairman: George H. Williams)
- Claims (Chairman: Timothy O. Howe)
- Coins, Weights and Measures (Select)
- Commerce (Chairman: Zachariah Chandler)
- Compensation (Select)
- Distributing Public Revenue Among the States (Select)
- District of Columbia (Chairman: Lot M. Morrill)
- Engrossed Bills (Chairman: Aaron H. Cragin)
- Finance (Chairman: William P. Fessenden)
- Foreign Relations (Chairman: Charles Sumner)
- Indian Affairs (Chairman: John B. Henderson)
- Interior Department Clerical Force (Select)
- Judiciary (Chairman: Lyman Trumbull)
- Manufactures (Chairman: William Sprague IV)
- Military Affairs and the Militia (Chairman: Henry Wilson)
- Mines and Mining (Chairman: John Conness)
- Mississippi River Levees Reconstruction (Select)
- National Banks (Select)
- National Telegraph Company (Select)
- Naval Affairs (Chairman: James W. Grimes)
- Ordnance and War Ships (Select)
- Pacific Railroad (Chairman: Jacob M. Howard)
- Patents and the Patent Office (Chairman: Waitman T. Willey)
- Pensions (Chairman: Henry S. Lane)
- Post Office and Post Roads (Chairman: Alexander Ramsey)
- Private Land Claims (Chairman: Ira Harris)
- Public Buildings and Grounds (Chairman: B. Gratz Brown)
- Public Lands (Chairman: Samuel C. Pomeroy)
- Retrenchment
- Revolutionary Claims (Chairman: Richard Yates)
- Tariff Regulation (Select)
- Territories (Chairman: Benjamin F. Wade)
- Whole

=== House of Representatives ===
- Accounts (Chairman: Edward H. Rollins)
- Agriculture (Chairman: John Bidwell)
- Appropriations (Chairman: Thaddeus Stevens)
- Banking and Currency (Chairman: Theodore M. Pomeroy)
- Claims (Chairman: Columbus Delano)
- Coinage, Weights and Measures (Chairman: John A. Kasson)
- Commerce (Chairman: Elihu B. Washburne)
- District of Columbia (Chairman: Ebon C. Ingersoll)
- Elections (Chairman: Henry L. Dawes)
- Expenditures in the Interior Department (Chairman: Ebenezer Dumont)
- Expenditures in the Navy Department (Chairman: George W. Julian)
- Expenditures in the Post Office Department (Chairman: Jehu Baker)
- Expenditures in the State Department (Chairman: Frederick A. Pike)
- Expenditures in the Treasury Department (Chairman: James M. Marvin)
- Expenditures in the War Department (Chairman: Henry C. Deming)
- Expenditures on Public Buildings (Chairman: John W. Longyear)
- Foreign Affairs (Chairman: Nathaniel P. Banks)
- Freedmen's Affairs (Chairman: Thomas D. Eliot)
- Indian Affairs (Chairman: William Windom)
- Invalid Pensions (Chairman: Sidney Perham)
- Judiciary (Chairman: James F. Wilson)
- Manufactures (Chairman: James K. Moorhead)
- Mileage (Chairman: George W. Anderson)
- Military Affairs (Chairman: Robert C. Schenck)
- Militia (Chairman: Abner C. Harding)
- Mines and Mining (Chairman: William Higby)
- Naval Affairs (Chairman: Alexander H. Rice)
- Pacific Railroads (Chairman: Hiram Price)
- Patents (Chairman: Thomas A. Jenckes)
- Post Office and Post Roads (Chairman: John B. Alley)
- Public Buildings and Grounds (Chairman: John H. Rice)
- Public Expenditures (Chairman: Calvin T. Hulburd)
- Public Lands (Chairman: George W. Julian)
- Revisal and Unfinished Business (Chairman: Glenni W. Scofield)
- Revolutionary Claims (Chairman: Kellian V. Whaley)
- Revolutionary Pensions (Chairman: Walter D. McIndoe)
- Roads and Canals (Chairman: Fernando C. Beaman)
- Rules (Select)
- Standards of Official Conduct
- Territories (Chairman: James M. Ashley)
- Ways and Means (Chairman: Justin S. Morrill)
- Whole

=== Joint committees ===
- Conditions of Indian Tribes (Special)
- Conduct of the War
- Enrolled Bills (Chairman: Sen. James Nye)
- The Library (Chairman: N/A)
- Printing (Chairman: N/A)
- Retrenchment
- To Inquire into the Condition of the States which Formed the So-Called Confederate States

== Caucuses ==
- Democratic (House)
- Democratic (Senate)

== Employees ==
=== Legislative branch agency directors ===
- Architect of the Capitol: Thomas U. Walter, resigned May 26, 1865
  - Edward Clark, appointed August 30, 1865
- Librarian of Congress: Ainsworth Rand Spofford

=== Senate ===
- Chaplain: Thomas Bowman (Methodist), until March 9, 1865
  - Edgar H. Gray (Baptist), from March 9, 1865
- Secretary: John W. Forney
- Sergeant at Arms: George T. Brown

=== House of Representatives ===
- Chaplain: William Henry Channing (Unitarian), until December 4, 1865
  - Charles B. Boynton (Congregationalist), from December 4, 1865
- Clerk: Edward McPherson
- Doorkeeper: Ira Goodnow
- Messenger to the Speaker: William D. Todd
- Postmaster: Josiah Given
- Reading Clerks: Edward W. Barber
- Sergeant at Arms: Nehemiah G. Ordway

== See also ==
- 1864 United States elections (elections leading to this Congress)
  - 1864 United States presidential election
  - 1864–65 United States Senate elections
  - 1864–65 United States House of Representatives elections
- 1866 United States elections (elections during this Congress, leading to the next Congress)
  - 1866–67 United States Senate elections
  - 1866–67 United States House of Representatives elections

== Notes ==
Congressional Globe, 39th Congress, external links to full text
Session	Part	Start date	End date	Pages	Google	Hathi
First	One	December 4, 1865	February 21, 1866	1 to 960	EL	EL
First	Two	February 21, 1866	April 12, 1866	961 to 1920	EL	EL
First	Three	April 12, 1866	May 29, 1866	1921 to 2880	EL	EL
First	Four	May 29, 1866	July 16, 1866	2881 to 3840	EL	EL
First	Five	July 16, 1866	July 28, 1866	3841 to 4310, plus Appendix	EL	EL
Second	One	December 3, 1866	January 25, 1867	1 to 752	EL	EL
Second	Two	January 25, 1867	February 18, 1867	753 to 1504	EL	EL
Second	Three	February 18, 1867	March 2, 1867	1505 to 2005, plus Appendix	EL	EL
