= Idaho Territory's at-large congressional district =

Former congressional district

Coordinates: 45°N 114°W

- Obsolete district
- Created: 1864, as a non-voting delegate was granted by Congress
- Eliminated: 1890, as a result of statehood
- Years active: 1864–1890

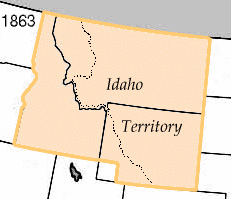
Idaho Territory, as originally organized, in 1863

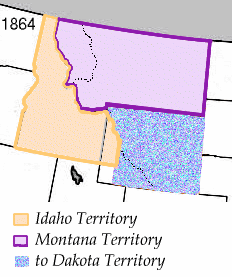
Idaho Territory in 1864

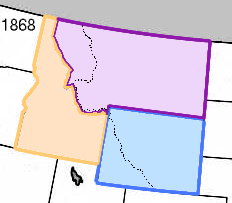
Idaho Territory (yellow) in 1868

Idaho Territory's at-large congressional district is an obsolete congressional district that encompassed the area of the Idaho Territory, which was originally created from parts of the Washington Territory and Dakota Territory in 1863. In 1864, parts of the territory were ceded back to the Dakota Territory and another part was reorganized into the Montana Territory. The boundaries of the territory were changed again in 1868 when the Wyoming Territory was created.

After Idaho's admission to the Union as the 43rd state by act of Congress on July 3, 1890, this district was dissolved and replaced by Idaho's at-large congressional district.

== List of members representing the district ==
On March 3, 1863, an act of Congress gave Idaho Territory the authority to elect a Congressional delegate, although the first delegate did not take his seat until 1864.

Delegate (District home)	Party	Years	Cong ress	Electoral history
District created February 1, 1864
William H. Wallace (Lewiston)	Union	February 1, 1864 – March 3, 1865	38th	Elected October 31, 1863 in anticipation of territorial status. Retired.
Edward D. Holbrook (Idaho City)	Democratic	March 4, 1865 – March 3, 1869	39th 40th	Elected in 1864. Re-elected in 1866. Retired.
Jacob K. Shafer (Idaho City)	Democratic	March 4, 1869 – March 3, 1871	41st	Elected in 1868. Lost renomination.
Samuel A. Merritt (Idaho City)	Democratic	March 4, 1871 – March 3, 1873	42nd	Elected in 1870. Lost renomination.
John Hailey (Boise City)	Democratic	March 4, 1873 – March 3, 1875	43rd	Elected in 1872. Retired.
Thomas W. Bennett (Boise City)	Independent	March 4, 1875 – June 23, 1876	44th	Elected in 1874. Lost election contest.
Stephen S. Fenn (Mount Idaho)	Democratic	June 23, 1876 – March 3, 1879	44th 45th	Won election contest. Re-elected in 1876. Retired.
George Ainslie (Idaho City)	Democratic	March 4, 1879 – March 3, 1883	46th 47th	Elected in 1878. Re-elected in 1880. Lost re-election.
Theodore F. Singiser (Boise City)	Republican	March 4, 1883 – March 3, 1885	48th	Elected in 1882. Lost re-election.
John Hailey (Boise City)	Democratic	March 4, 1885 – March 3, 1887	49th	Elected in 1884. Lost re-election.
Fred Dubois (Blackfoot)	Republican	March 4, 1887 – July 3, 1890	50th 51st	Elected in 1886. Re-elected in 1888. District eliminated upon statehood.
District eliminated July 3, 1890
