= List of United States senators in the 39th Congress =

This is a complete list of United States senators during the 39th United States Congress listed by seniority from March 4, 1865, to March 3, 1867.

Order of service is based on the commencement of the senator's first term. Behind this is former service as a senator (only giving the senator seniority within their new incoming class), service as vice president, a House member, a cabinet secretary, or a governor of a state. The final factor is the population of the senator's state.

Senators who were sworn in during the middle of the Congress (up until the last senator who was not sworn in early after winning the November 1866 election) are listed at the end of the list with no number.

== Terms of service ==
Class	Terms of service of senators that expired in years
Class 3	Terms of service of senators that expired in 1867 (AL, AR, CA, CT, FL, GA, IA, IL, IN, KS, KY, LA, MD, MO, NC, NH, NV, NY, OH, OR, PA, SC, VT, and WI.)
Class 1	Terms of service of senators that expired in 1869 (CA, CT, DE, FL, IN, MA, MD, ME, MI, MN, MO, MS, NE, NJ, NV, NY, OH, PA, RI, TN, TX, VA, VT, WI, and WV)
Class 2	Terms of service of senators that expired in 1871 (AL, AR, DE, GA, IA, IL, KS, KY, LA, MA, ME, MI, MN, MS, NC, NE, NH, NJ, OR, RI, SC, TN, TX, VA, and WV.)

== U.S. Senate seniority list ==
U.S. Senate seniority
Rank	Senator (party-state)	Seniority date	Other factors
1	Solomon Foot (R-VT)	March 4, 1851	
2	Benjamin Wade (R-OH)	March 15, 1851	
3	Charles Sumner (LR-MA)	April 11, 1851	
4	Henry Wilson (R-MA)	January 31, 1855	
5	Lyman Trumbull (R-IL)	March 4, 1855	
6	Jacob Collamer (R-VT)	March 4, 1855	
7	Lafayette S. Foster (R-CT)	March 4, 1855	
8	James Harlan (R-IA)	January 29, 1857	
9	Zachariah Chandler (R-MI)	March 4, 1857	
10	James Dixon (R-CT)	March 4, 1857	
11	James R. Doolittle (R-WI)	March 4, 1857	
12	Daniel Clark (R-NH)	June 27, 1857	
13	Henry B. Anthony (R-RI)	March 4, 1859	Former governor
14	Willard Saulsbury Sr. (D-DE)	March 4, 1859	
15	James W. Grimes (R-IA)	March 4, 1859	
16	Timothy O. Howe (R-WI)	March 4, 1861	
17	James A. McDougall (D-CA)	March 4, 1861	
18	Henry S. Lane (R-WI)	March 4, 1861	
19	Ira Harris (R-NJ)	March 4, 1861	
20	James Nesmith (D-OR)	March 4, 1861	
21	Edgar Cowan (R-PA)	March 4, 1861	
22	John Sherman (R-OH)	March 21, 1861	
23	Samuel C. Pomeroy (R-KS)	April 4, 1861	
24	Jim Lane (R-KS)	April 4, 1861	
25	Garrett Davis (U-KY)	December 23, 1861	
26	Jacob M. Howard (R-MI)	January 17, 1862	
27	Alexander Ramsey (R-MN)	March 4, 1863	
28	William Sprague IV (R-RI)	March 4, 1863	
29	John Conness (R-CA)	March 4, 1863	
30	Thomas A. Hendricks (D-IN)	March 4, 1863	
31	Reverdy Johnson (D-MD)	March 4, 1863	
32	Edwin D. Morgan (R-NY)	March 4, 1863	
33	Charles R. Buckalew (D-PA)	March 4, 1863	
34	William Wright (D-NJ)	March 4, 1863	
35	Waitman T. Willey (R-VA)	August 4, 1863	
36	Peter G. Van Winkle (U-WV)	August 4, 1863	
37	Benjamin G. Brown (D-MO)	November 13, 1863	
38	George R. Riddle (D-DE)	February 2, 1864	
39	William M. Stewart (R-NV)	February 1, 1865	
40	James W. Nye (R-NV)	February 1, 1865	
41	Aaron H. Cragin (R-NH)	March 4, 1865	
42	Richard Yates (R-IL)	March 4, 1865	
43	William P. Fessenden (R-ME)	March 4, 1865	
44	Daniel S. Norton (R-MN)	March 4, 1865	
45	George H. Williams (R-OR)	March 4, 1865	
46	James Guthrie (D-KY)	March 4, 1865	
47	John Creswell (UU-MD)	March 9, 1865	
48	John P. Stockton (D-NJ)	March 15, 1865	
	Luke P. Poland (R-VT)	November 21, 1865	
	Samuel J. Kirkwood (R-IA)	January 13, 1866	
	George F. Edmunds (R-VT)	April 3, 1866	
	Edmund G. Ross (R-KS)	July 19, 1866	
	Joseph S. Fowler (U-TN)	July 24, 1866	
	David T. Patterson (U-TN)	July 28, 1866	
	George G. Fogg (R-NH)	August 31, 1866	
	Alexander G. Cattell (R-NJ)	September 19, 1866	
	Thomas Tipton (R-NE)	March 1, 1867	
	John Milton Thayer (R-NE)	March 1, 1867	

== See also ==
- 39th United States Congress
- List of United States representatives in the 39th Congress
