= Samuel H. Dosh =

6th President pro tempore of the California State Senate
- In office January 5, 1857 – April 29, 1857
- Preceded by: Delos R. Ashley
- Succeeded by: Samuel A. Merritt

Member of the California State Senate from the 13th district
- In office 1855–1856

Personal details
- Born: Samuel H. Dosh; March 19, 1827 Strasburg, Virginia, U.S.
- Died: June 13, 1861 (age 34) Shasta, California, U.S.
- Party: Democratic
- Spouse: Eleanor F. Crawford (m. 1856)
- Children: 2

Military service
- Branch/service: United States Army
- Rank: General

Samuel H. Dosh (March 19, 1827 – June 13, 1861) was an American military officer and politician who served in the California State Senate and served as President pro tempore in 1857.

== Biography ==
Samuel H. Dosh was born in Strasburg, Virginia in 1827, and worked in printing in Lexington, Virginia before traveling to California in 1849 to work as a miner in El Dorado County. In 1853, Dosh was elected a trustee of the Shasta County Mining and Water Company. He eventually worked for The Placer Times and The Sacramento Union before moving to Shasta in February 1852 and establishing The Shasta Courier. He was a General in the U.S. Army.

Dosh was elected in the California State Senate's 13th district in 1855 and again 1856. He served as President pro tempore between January and April 1857.

He died on June 13, 1861, in Shasta.

== Personal life ==
Dosh was married to Eleanor F. Crawford in 1856 and had two daughters. Dosh was a member of the Odd Fellows.

Preceded by Delos R. Ashley	President pro tempore of the California State Senate; 1857–1857	Succeeded by Samuel A. Merritt
