= Edwin H. Webster =

American politician (1829–1893)

Edwin Hanson Webster
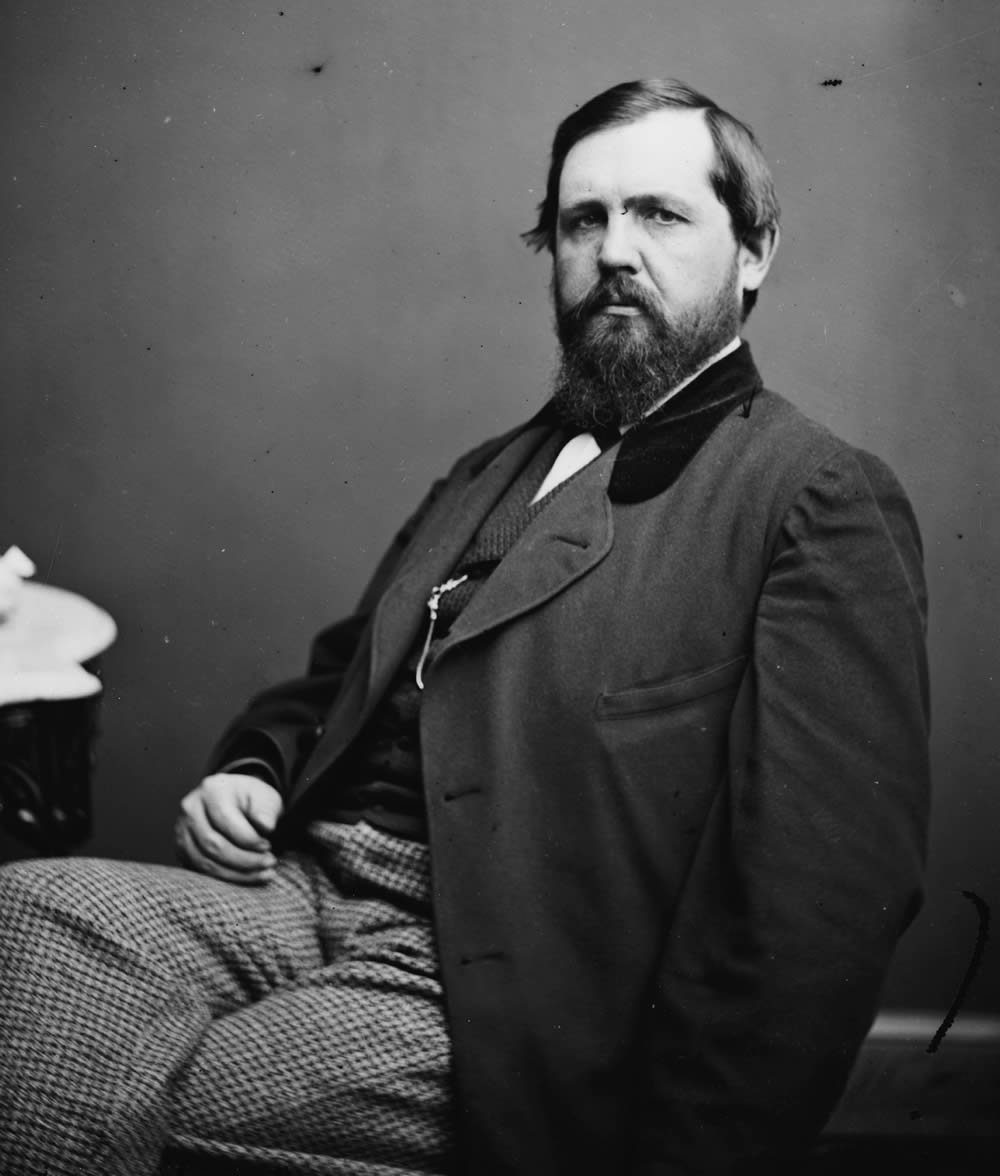

Member of the U.S. House of Representatives from Maryland's 2nd district
- In office March 4, 1859 – July 1865

Member of the Maryland Senate
- In office 1855–1859
- Preceded by: Henry D. Farnandis
- Succeeded by: Franklin Whitaker
- Constituency: Harford County

Personal details
- Born: March 31, 1829 near Churchville, Maryland, U.S.
- Died: April 24, 1893 (aged 64) Bel Air, Maryland, U.S.
- Resting place: Calvary Cemetery near Churchville, Maryland, U.S.
- Party: Whig; American Party; Union; Unconditional Union
- Spouse: Caroline H. Earl (m. 1855)
- Education: Dickinson College

Edwin Hanson Webster (March 31, 1829 – April 24, 1893) was a U.S. congressman from Maryland, serving the second district for two terms from 1859 until 1865. Prior to the American Civil War, Webster was a lawyer and Maryland state senator from 1855 to 1859. In the summer of 1862, he recruited the 7th Maryland Infantry Regiment and served as colonel until he returned to Congress on January 1, 1863. He resumed command of the regiment from March 4, 1863 and resigned his commission in September to return to Congress. In 1864, he drafted a military code for the Maryland state militia. After July 1865, he was twice a collector of customs at Baltimore, a lawyer in private practice and president of the Harford National Bank in Harford County, Maryland.

== Early life ==
Edwin Hanson Webster was born on March 31, 1829, near Churchville, Maryland, to Martha (née Hanson) and Henry Webster. Webster received a classical training, and attended the Churchville Academy and later the New London Academy of Chester County, Pennsylvania. He graduated from Dickinson College of Carlisle, Pennsylvania in 1847, and afterwards taught school and studied law at the office of Otho Scott of Bel Air, Maryland. He taught at a classical school near his father's home for eighteen months. He was admitted to the bar in 1851, and commenced practice in Bel Air.

== Early career and American Civil War ==
In 1851, prior to being admitted to the bar, Webster was nominated as a Whig for the office of state's attorney, but lost by a margin of ten votes to William H. Dallam. He practiced law with Stevenson Archer for four years.

Webster was elected to the Maryland Senate, defeating Ramsey McHenry. He served in that role from 1855 until 1859. In 1856, Webster served as president of the senate. In 1856, Webster was a presidential elector. During the American Civil War, Webster was colonel of the 7th Regiment Maryland Volunteer Infantry, serving in 1862 and 1863. He was elected as a candidate of the American Party (Know Nothing) to the Thirty-sixth Congress, defeating Ramsey McHenry. He was also elected as an Unionist to the Thirty-seventh Congress and as an Unconditional Unionist to the Thirty-eighth and Thirty-ninth Congresses.

Webster served in Congress, representing Maryland's 2nd congressional district, starting on March 4, 1859. He twice declined appointments as a brigadier general. In the summer of 1862, he recruited the 7th Maryland Infantry Regiment. On January 1, 1863, he relinquished command of the regiment to Charles E. Phelps to return to the U.S. House of Representatives. After a short session, he assumed command of the regiment on March 4. After getting re-elected to the U.S. House of Representatives, he resigned his military commission in December. In the summer of 1864, after the invasion of Maryland by the Confederates, he offered his services to Governor Augustus Bradford. Bradford then appointed Webster to draft a military code for the state militia. He was again elected to the U.S. House of Representatives in November 1864. He voted for abolition of slavery in the United States. He resigned in July 1865.

== Later career ==
In 1865, he was appointed by President Abraham Lincoln as collector of customs at the Port of Baltimore, serving in that position from July 27, 1865, to April 15, 1869. A list of Maryland appointments, including Webster's, was in the pocket of Lincoln during his assassination. Afterwards, he resumed the practice of his profession in Bel Air until he was again appointed collector of customs by President Chester A. Arthur on February 17, 1882. He served as collector until February 23, 1886. In 1882, he engaged in banking, which he followed until his death. After his retirement, Webster served as president of the Harford National Bank until his death.

== Personal life ==
Webster married Caroline H. (née McCormick) Earl in June 1855. They had at least four children, J. Edwin, Ida M., Bessie and Caroline H. His daughter Bessie married William H. Harlan, a Bel Air educator and law partner of his son J. Edwin.

Webster died in Bel Air on April 24, 1893. He is interred in Calvary Cemetery, near Churchville.

Political offices
Preceded by George Wells	President of the Maryland State Senate; 1858	Succeeded by John B. Brooke
U.S. House of Representatives
Preceded by James B. Ricaud	U.S. Congressman from the 2nd district of Maryland; 1859–1865	Succeeded by John L. Thomas Jr.
