= Samuel A. Merritt =

American politician (1827–1910)

Samuel Augustus Merritt
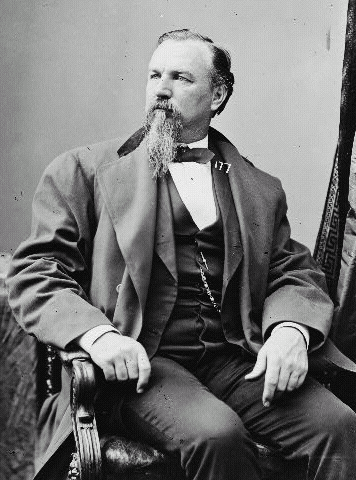

Delegate to the U.S. House of Representatives from Idaho Territory
- In office March 4, 1871 – March 3, 1873
- Preceded by: Jacob K. Shafer
- Succeeded by: John Hailey

7th President pro tempore of the California State Senate
- In office January 4, 1858 – April 26, 1858
- Preceded by: Samuel H. Dosh
- Succeeded by: W. B. Dickinson

Member of the California State Senate from the 6th district
- In office 1857–1861

Member of the California State Assembly from the 10th district
- In office 1851–1851

Personal details
- Born: August 15, 1827 Staunton, Virginia, U.S.
- Died: September 8, 1910 (aged 83) Salt Lake City, Utah, U.S.
- Party: Democratic
- Profession: Attorney

Samuel Augustus Merritt (August 15, 1827 – September 8, 1910) was an American politician who served as a California legislator, as a Congressional Delegate from Idaho Territory, and as a judge in Utah Territory.

Born in Staunton, Virginia, Merritt was graduated from Washington College, Lexington, Virginia, in 1848. He moved to Mariposa County, California in 1849, and was county clerk and public administrator in 1850. He served as a member of the California State Assembly in 1851 and 1852, representing Mariposa and Tulare counties. He studied law, and was admitted to the bar in 1852 and commenced practice. He served in the California State Senate 1857–1862. He moved to the Territory of Idaho in 1862.

Merritt was elected as a Democrat to the Forty-second Congress (March 4, 1871 – March 3, 1873); he was an unsuccessful candidate for renomination in 1872. He moved to Salt Lake City, Utah in 1873 and engaged in mining operations and the practice of law. He was city attorney 1888–1890, and served as a member of the Democratic National Committee in 1892. He was chief justice of the supreme court of the Territory of Utah from 1894 to 1896. He died in Salt Lake City at age 83, and was interred in Salt Lake City Cemetery.

Political offices
Preceded by District created	California State Assemblyman, 10th District; 1851–1853 (with H. S. Richardson, then Thomas E. Ridley)	Succeeded by Samuel Bell, Philemon T. Herbert
U.S. House of Representatives
Preceded by Jacob K. Shafer	Delegate to the U.S. House of Representatives from Idaho; 1871–1873	Succeeded by John Hailey
