= United States House Committee on Freedmen's Affairs =

The Committee on Freedmen's Affairs was a select committee of the U.S. House of Representatives.

== History ==
The committee was established on December 6, 1865, with the mandate that "so much of the President's message as relates to freedmen shall be referred; and all reports and papers concerning freedmen shall be referred to them, with the liberty to report by bill or otherwise."At the opening of the second session of the same Congress (39th), the committee was continued as a standing committee with the same jurisdiction. At the opening of the 44th Congress (1875), Representative James G. Blaine observed that the recent amendments to the Constitution ensured "that there is no longer any distinction between American citizens; that we are all equal before the law; and that all legislation respecting the rights of any person should go through the regular standing committees." The committee was therefore omitted from the committee roster, and its jurisdiction was returned to other committees, in large part to the Judiciary Committee.

== See also ==
- Freedmen's Bureau
