= Jacob K. Shafer =

American judge (1823–1876)

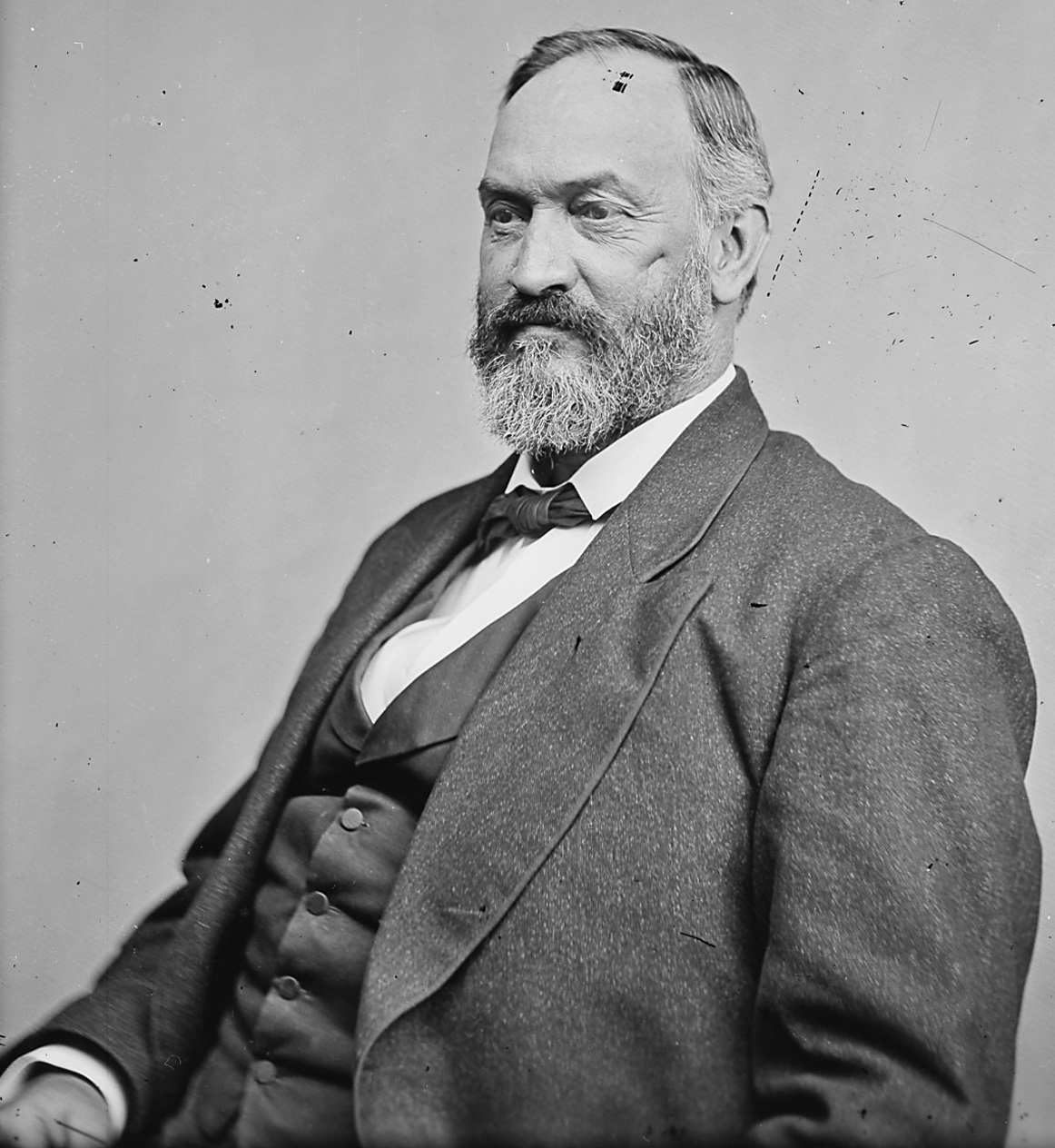

Delegate to the U.S. House of Representatives from Idaho Territory
- In office March 4, 1869 – March 3, 1871
- Preceded by: Edward Dexter Holbrook
- Succeeded by: Samuel A. Merritt

4th Mayor of Stockton, California
- In office January 1853 – May 1853
- Preceded by: William Baker
- Succeeded by: M.B. Kenney

Personal details
- Born: December 26, 1823 Broadway, Virginia, US
- Died: November 22, 1876 (aged 52) Eureka, Nevada, US
- Party: Democratic
- Profession: Attorney

Jacob K. Shafer (December 26, 1823 – November 22, 1876) was an American politician who served as the delegate from Idaho Territory.

Born near Broadway, Virginia, Shafer was graduated from Washington and Lee University, Lexington, Virginia, in 1843. And from the law school of L.P. Thompson in Staunton, Virginia, in 1846. He moved to Stockton, California in 1849, was admitted to the bar in California and practiced law. He served as district attorney of the fifth judicial district of California in 1850. He served as mayor of Stockton in 1852 and as a judge of the San Joaquin County Court from 1853 to 1862. In 1862 he moved to what later became Idaho Territory.

Shafer was elected as a Democrat to the Forty-first Congress (March 4, 1869 – March 3, 1871), but was an unsuccessful candidate for renomination. He resumed the practice of law, then later he moved to Eureka, Nevada, where he died November 22, 1876. He was interred in the Masonic Cemetery.

== Sources ==
- United States Congress. "Jacob K. Shafer (id: S000276)". Biographical Directory of the United States Congress.

U.S. House of Representatives
Preceded by Edward D. Holbrook	Delegate to the U.S. House of Representatives from Idaho; 1869–1871	Succeeded by Samuel Augustus Merritt
