= Theodore Frelinghuysen Singiser =

American politician (1845-1907)

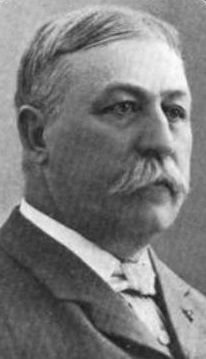

Delegate to the U.S. House of Representatives from Idaho Territory
- In office March 4, 1883 – March 3, 1885
- Preceded by: George Ainslie
- Succeeded by: John Hailey

Acting Governor of Idaho
- In office 1881–1882
- Lieutenant Governor: Vacant
- Preceded by: John Baldwin Neil
- Succeeded by: John Baldwin Neil

Personal details
- Born: March 15, 1845 Cumberland County, Pennsylvania, U.S.
- Died: January 23, 1907 (aged 61) Chicago, Illinois, U.S.
- Party: Republican
- Profession: Attorney

Theodore Frelinghuysen Singiser (March 15, 1845 – January 23, 1907) was a Delegate from Idaho Territory.

== Early life ==
Born in Churchtown in Cumberland County, Pennsylvania, Singiser attended the common schools. He learned the art of printing, and then enlisted in the Union Army as a private in Company E, Sixth Regiment, Pennsylvania Reserves, on June 6, 1861.

== Career ==
He served as assistant assessor of internal revenue in 1866 and 1867, and engaged in mercantile and editorial pursuits. He studied law, and was admitted to the bar in Washington, D.C., in 1878. Singiser was employed in the United States Treasury from June 1, 1875, to May 31, 1879. He was appointed receiver of public moneys at Oxford, Idaho, in February 1879. He engaged in mining in Idaho and Utah, and was Secretary of the Territory of Idaho in 1880. He was also Acting Governor of Idaho Territory during the winter of 1881-1882.

Singiser was elected as a Republican to the Forty-eighth Congress (March 4, 1883 – March 3, 1885). He was an unsuccessful candidate for reelection in 1884 to the Forty-ninth Congress. He was the receiver of public money at Mitchell, Dakota (now South Dakota) from 1885 to 1889.

== Personal life ==
Singiser was a member of the Frelinghuysen family and had significant holdings in business. Singiser was also involved in mining.

He died in 1907 in Chicago, he was interred in Chestnut Hill Cemetery, Mechanicsburg, Pennsylvania.

Singiser never married.

== Sources ==
- United States Congress. "Theodore Frelinghuysen Singiser (id: S000443)". Biographical Directory of the United States Congress.

U.S. House of Representatives
Preceded by George Ainslie	Delegate to the U.S. House of Representatives from Idaho; 1883-1885	Succeeded by John Hailey
