= 7th Maryland Infantry Regiment =

Military unit on the Union side during the American Civil War

The 7th Regiment Maryland Volunteer Infantry was a regiment that participated in the American Civil War.

== Service ==
The regiment was recruited from the northern line of Maryland counties, under the call of July 1, 1862, for "three years or the war". Toward the end of August, 1862, nine companies had been enrolled and mustered in Baltimore, and went into "Camp Harford", a spot now included within the limits of Druid Hill Park. The aggregate strength of the regiment at formation was 784 officers and men. Call of duty hurried it to the field before it had received its tenth company, the men recruited for which were mustered into other regiments. The tenth Company, K, was composed of the re-enlisted men of the Tenth Maryland (a six months' organization), and joined the regiment in April, 1864.

The Seventh Regiment was raised and originally commanded by Colonel Edwin H. Webster, of Harford County, a representative from Maryland in Congress. Lieutenant Colonel Charles E. Phelps, subsequently promoted Colonel, and later Brigadier-General by brevet, was a member of the Baltimore bar, and had been Major of the "Maryland Guard", somewhat celebrated just before the war as a thoroughly drilled volunteer battalion. Additional leadership was provided by Major William H. Dallam, a prominent and highly esteemed lawyer of Harford County. Dallam had served as the Clerk of the Circuit Court and for many years as State's Attorney.

After serving guard duty in the defenses of Washington, the regiment was sent to the Shenandoah Valley for operations. Their first combat came on March 13, 1863, when they repulsed a charge by the 5th Virginia Infantry regiment. They were sent to V Corps, Army of the Potomac. At the Battle of Gettysburg, they were forced to withdraw from the Peach Orchard early on the second day. They were among the units who repelled Pickett's charge. The unit was stationed for garrison duty in southern Pennsylvania and was involved in skirmishes against some of Jubal Early's infantry units. Because of heavy losses at the Battle of Cold Harbor, they were sent as replacements to IV corps, Army of the Potomac. They suffered heavy casualties during the Siege of Petersburg, having to repel six charges by counterattacking units of the 15th Georgia Volunteer Infantry. They marched in the Grand review and were mustered out of service on June 3, 1865.

This unit suffered the loss of 389 men, who were 23 officers and 366 enlisted men, and 65 of those men died of disease. 13 men were captured at Gettysburg, 5 of which perished at Libby Prison. Unit was noted by President Lincoln for being "very effective in combat and showing utmost loyalty to the cause of the great republic".
