= John Hailey =

American politician

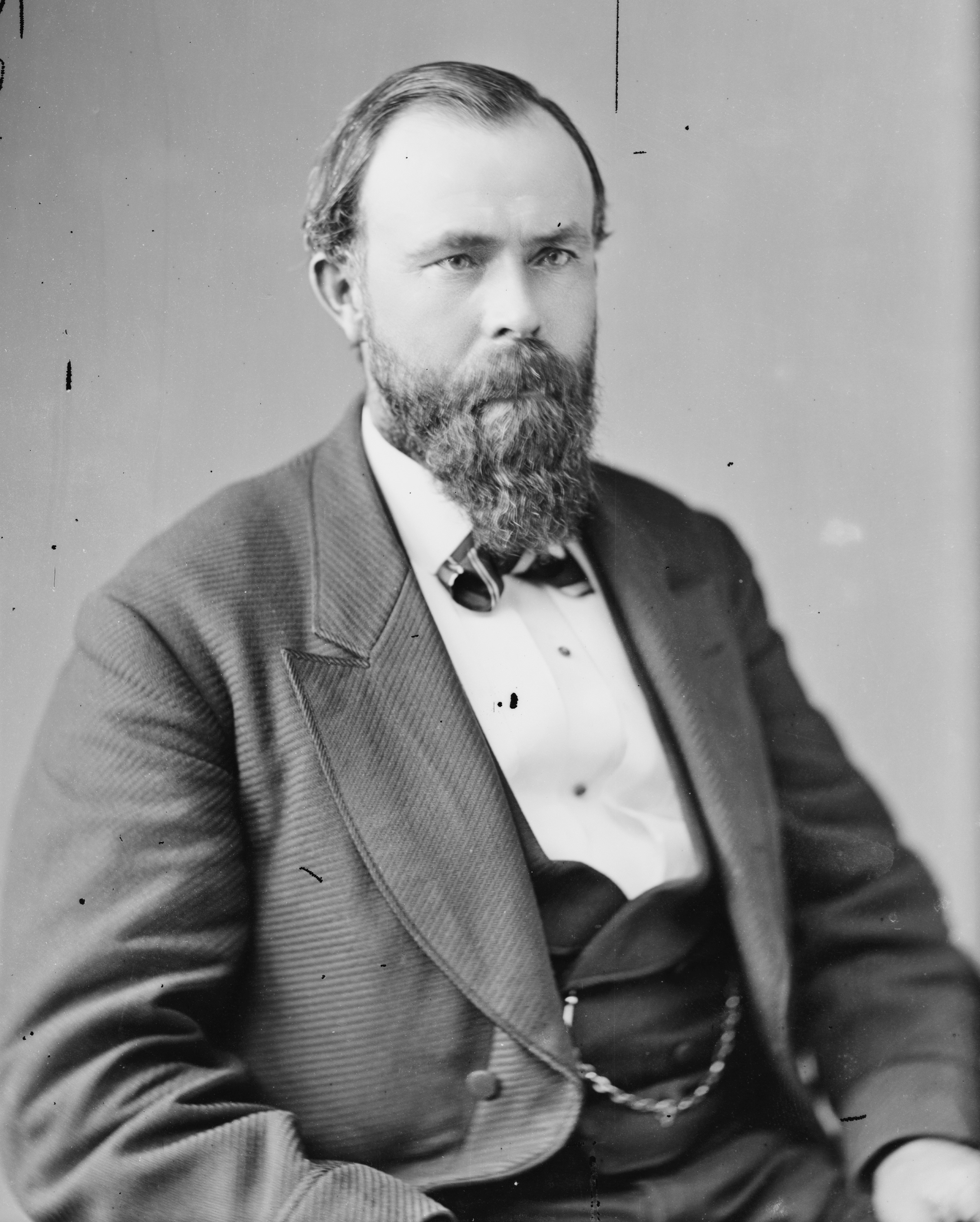
- Mathew Brady photo, Library of Congress

County Commissioner of Logan County, Idaho
- In office 1891–1893

Delegate to the U.S. House of Representatives from Idaho Territory
- In office March 4, 1873 – March 3, 1875
- Preceded by: Samuel A. Merritt
- Succeeded by: Thomas W. Bennett
- In office March 4, 1885 – March 3, 1887
- Preceded by: Theodore F. Singiser
- Succeeded by: Fred Dubois

Member of the Idaho Territorial Council
- In office 1880–1881
- Constituency: Ada and Washington Counties

County Commissioner of Ada County
- In office 1877–1879

Personal details
- Born: August 29, 1835 Smith County, Tennessee, U.S.
- Died: April 10, 1921 (aged 85) Boise, Idaho, U.S.
- Party: Democratic
- Profession: Rancher, mining
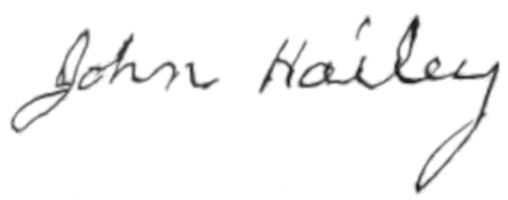
- Signature

John Hailey (August 29, 1835 – April 10, 1921) was an American politician who served as a Congressional Delegate from Idaho Territory.

== Biography ==
Hailey was born in Smith County, Tennessee, and attended the public schools. Of Scottish ancestry, his grandfather, Philip Hailey, and his father, John Hailey, were both natives of Virginia. His father married Miss Nancy Baird, a native of Tennessee, the daughter of Captain Josiah Baird, who had been a captain in the War of 1812.

He moved in 1848 to Missouri with his parents, who settled in Dade County. Hailey crossed the Plains, emigrating to Oregon in 1853. He enlisted as a private on the outbreak of the Rogue River Indian War in 1855 and was subsequently promoted to lieutenant. He married Louisa M. Griffin on August 7, 1856, in Jackson County, Oregon, and they would have six children including Thomas G. Hailey, who would serve in the Oregon Supreme Court. Hailey moved to Washington Territory in 1862 and engaged in agricultural pursuits, stock raising, and mining.

Hailey was elected mayor of Boise, Idaho Territory, in 1871 but never took office. He was elected as a Delegate to the Forty-third Congress (March 4, 1873 – March 3, 1875). He declined to be a candidate for renomination in 1874.

From 1877 to 1879, Hailey was a county commissioner for Ada County, and from 1880 to 1881, he represented Ada and Washington Counties on the Idaho Territorial Council, serving as its president. In 1884, Hailey was elected to the Forty-ninth Congress (March 4, 1885 – March 3, 1887), and was an unsuccessful candidate for reelection in 1886 to the Fiftieth Congress. From 1891 to 1893, he served as a county commissioner for Logan County.

== Later life ==
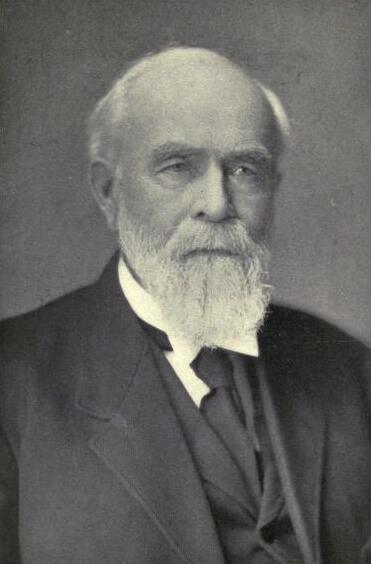
Hailey in his later years

He was appointed warden of the Idaho State Penitentiary in 1899. In 1907, upon the founding of the Historical Society of the State of Idaho, Hailey was made its first secretary and librarian. In 1910, as secretary and librarian, Hailey wrote a history of the state at the request of the legislature.

He died in Boise, Idaho, on April 10, 1921, and was interred in the Masonic Burial Ground. The city of Hailey is named in his honor.

In 1958, he was inducted into the Hall of Great Westerners of the National Cowboy & Western Heritage Museum.

== Sources ==
- United States Congress. "John Hailey (id: H000023)". Biographical Directory of the United States Congress.

U.S. House of Representatives
Preceded by Samuel A. Merritt	Delegate to the U.S. House of Representatives from Idaho; 1873-1875	Succeeded by Thomas W. Bennett
Preceded by Theodore F. Singiser	Delegate to the U.S. House of Representatives from Idaho; 1885-1887	Succeeded by Fred Dubois
