= Charles E. Phelps =

Union Army general

Charles Edward Phelps
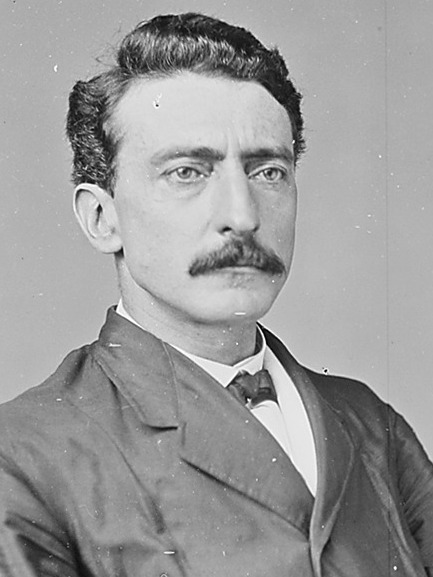

Judge of the Circuit Court of Baltimore
- In office 1882–1908
- Appointed by: William Thomas Hamilton

Member of the U.S. House of Representatives from Maryland's 3rd district
- In office March 4, 1865 – March 3, 1869
- Preceded by: Henry Winter Davis
- Succeeded by: Thomas Swann

Member of the Baltimore City Council
- In office 1860–1861

Personal details
- Born: May 1, 1833 Guilford, Vermont, US
- Died: December 27, 1908 (aged 75) Baltimore, Maryland, US
- Resting place: Woodlawn Cemetery, Baltimore, Maryland
- Party: Know Nothing (before 1861); Union (1861–63); Unconditional Union (1863–66); Conservative (1866–69)
- Spouse: Martha Woodward
- Parent: Almira Hart Lincoln Phelps (mother)
- Education: Princeton University; Harvard University Law School

Military service
- Allegiance: Union
- Branch/service: United States Army (Union Army)
- Years of service: 1861–1864
- Rank: Colonel; Brevet Brigadier General
- Unit: 7th Maryland Infantry Regiment
- Battles/wars: American Civil War; *Battle of Spotsylvania
- Awards: Medal of Honor

Charles Edward Phelps (May 1, 1833 – December 27, 1908) was a colonel in the Union Army during the Civil War, later received a brevet as a brigadier general of volunteers, served as a city councilman, a U.S. Congressman from the third district of Maryland, and received the Medal of Honor. In later life, he was professor of equity at University of Maryland Law School and served for many years as judge on the Circuit Court of Baltimore.

== Early life and education ==
Charles Edward Phelps was born in Guilford, Vermont, on May 1, 1833. His father was John Phelps, a lawyer and Senator in the Vermont State government. At the age of 5, he moved with his parents to Pennsylvania, and at the age of 8 to Maryland, when his mother, Almira Hart Lincoln Phelps,(sister of Emma Willard), became principal of the Patapsco Female Seminary in Ellicott City. He matriculated at Princeton University, where he was admitted to the Zeta Psi fraternity, graduating in 1852. He then studied at Harvard University Law School, graduating in 1853.

== Early career ==
Phelps was admitted the Maryland bar association in 1855. He was admitted to practice in the Supreme Court of the United States in 1859.

In 1860, Phelps was elected and served on the Baltimore City Council.

== Civil War military service ==
In 1861, Phelpswas commissioned a major of the Maryland Guard, and, in 1862, he was raised to lieutenant colonel of the 7th Maryland Infantry Regiment, fighting for the Union. He became colonel in 1863.

During the Battle of the Wilderness in 1864 his horse was killed from under him. While leading a charge at Laurel Hill during the Battle of Spotsylvania, Phelps was wounded and taken prisoner. However, he was later rescued by General Phillip Sheridan's cavalry under the immediate command of Brigadier General George Armstrong Custer. Phelps received the Medal of Honor for valor at the Battle of Spotsylvania Court House on May 8, 1864.

He was honorably discharged on account of wounds on September 9, 1864. Shortly thereafter Phelps was elected as congressman from the 3rd district of Maryland to the Thirty-Ninth Congress as an Unconditional Unionist, and was reelected to the Fortieth Congress as a member of the Conservative Party (as the Democratic Party was being referred to in some states). On May 4, 1866, President Andrew Johnson nominated Phelps for appointment to the brevet grade of brigadier general of volunteers to rank from March 13, 1865, and the U.S. Senate confirmed the appointment on May 18, 1866.

After the war, Phelps became a companion of the Maryland Commandery of the Military Order of the Loyal Legion of the United States.

On March 30, 1898, Phelps was awarded the Medal of Honor in honor of his military service. The citation read,

Rode to the head of the assaulting column, then much broken by severe losses and faltering under the close fire of artillery, placed himself conspicuously in front of the troops, and gallantly rallied and led them to within a few feet of the enemy's works, where he was severely wounded and captured.

== United States House of Representatives ==
Phelps served in the United States House of Representatives from 1865 through 1869. At this time, his party affiliation was "Conservative".

In February 1868, he voted against the impeachment of President Andrew Johnson. In his remarks to the House on the day of the impeachment vote, Phelps questioned whether Johnson's attempted at removing Edwin Stanton as secretary of war (which triggered the impeachment) had been indeed constituted a violation of the Tenure of Office Act. He cast doubt that it could be considered have yet been a removal, since Stanton was still fighting it, and also argued that no appointment of a successor to Stanton had actually been made, since Johnson had instead only acted to empower an officer to act in an ad interim capacity. He also questioned whether Stanton would be eligible for protection under the law, as he had been appointed by Abraham Lincoln, not Johnson. Phelps also questioned the constitutionality of the Tenure of Office Act, as he argued it interfered with the presidents' constitutional power to remove officers. Phelps further argued,

The power of impeachment is expressly limited to cases of "treason, bribery, or other crimes and high misdemeanors." No charge is preferred against the president other than an official act which is by a forced construction of the Tenure of Office law claimed to be a "high misdemeanor".

== Later government work and judgeship ==
In 1872, he served as the state manager of Prince George's County's House of Reformation for Colored Children. In 1876, he served as a commissioner of the Baltimore Public Schools school board.

In 1882, he was appointed by Governor William Thomas Hamilton to serve as an associate judge of the Circuit Court of Baltimore. He held this judgeship until the year he died.

== Other ventures ==
In 1869, he established a legal practice with John Van Lear Findlay.

In 1896, Phelps became a charter member of the Maryland State Bar Association.

Phelps taught at University of Maryland Law School from 1884 through 1907, where he was a professor of equity. In 1901, he published the book Falstaff and Equity, relating legal arguments to Shakespeare. In 1907 he received an honorary Doctor of Laws from Princeton University.

== Personal life and death ==
In 1868, Phelps married Martha Woodward of Baltimore.

Phelps died on December 27, 1908, at Baltimore, Maryland and was buried at Woodlawn Cemetery, Baltimore.

== See also ==
- List of Medal of Honor recipients
- List of American Civil War Medal of Honor recipients: T–Z
- List of American Civil War brevet Generals (Union)

== Notes ==
U.S. House of Representatives
Preceded by Henry Winter Davis	U.S. Congressman, Maryland's 3rd District; 1865–1869	Succeeded by Thomas Swann
