= Edward D. Holbrook =

American politician (1836–1870)

Edward Holbrook
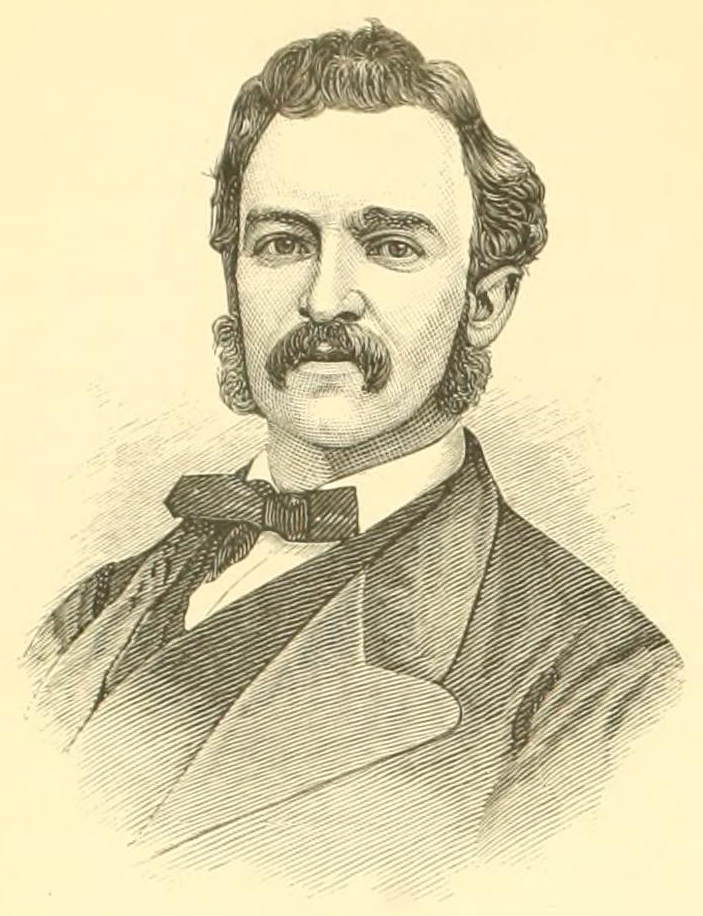

Delegate to the U.S. House of Representatives from the Idaho Territory's at-large district
- In office March 4, 1865 – March 3, 1869
- Preceded by: William H. Wallace
- Succeeded by: Jacob K. Shafer

Personal details
- Born: Edward Dexter Holbrook; May 6, 1836 Elyria, Ohio, U.S.
- Died: June 18, 1870 (aged 34) Idaho City, Idaho Territory, U.S.
- Party: Democratic
- Education: Oberlin College (LLB)

Edward Dexter Holbrook (May 6, 1836 – June 18, 1870) was an American lawyer and politician who served as a delegate to the U.S. House of Representatives from the Idaho Territory from 1865 to 1869.

== Early life and career ==
Edward Dexter Holbrook was born May 6, 1836, in Elyria, Ohio. He attended public schools and studied law at Oberlin College. He was admitted to the bar in 1859, aged 23, and maintained a private practice in Elyria. He later moved to Weaverville, California, then Placerville, Idaho, amid the discovery of gold in Idaho. He continued practicing law in Placerville until he was elected as a delegate.

== U.S. House of Representatives ==
=== Elections ===
A Democrat, Holbrook was elected as a delegate on October 10, 1864, defeating Samuel C. Parks, a Unionist, with 4,639 votes (53.3%) to Parks's 4,060 (46.7%). On October 22, believing that he had likely been elected, Holbrook gave a speech in Idaho City, where he vowed to serve the people of Idaho, not any political party. He was officially declared the winner by governor Caleb Lyon on November 14.

Holbrook was reelected on August 13, 1866, defeating Republican J. M. Kirkpatrick, with 3,638 votes (55.4%) to Kirkpatrick's 2,923 (44.6%).

=== Tenure ===
While Holbrook officially entered office on March 4, 1865, The Idaho World announced Holbrook's intentions to maintain his practice until Congress first convened in December, unless a special session was called. He left for Washington, D.C., on October 16, 1865; on the day of his departure, his friends gifted him a pocket watch. On his trip to D.C., he took a steamboat from San Francisco to New York City.

On February 4, 1869, during the debate of an Indian Appropriations Act, Holbrook interrupted Benjamin Butler, a Republican from Massachusetts, and said that his claims about Indian agents were false:

And after the gentleman having charge of this bill [Butler] saw fit to silence Delegates here by raising points of order and making assertions which he knows at the time he made them to be unqualifiedly false...

After he refused to retract this claim, Holbrook was censured by the House of Representatives for the use of unparliamentary language. Holbrook did not seek reelection to a third term in 1868; he was succeeded by Jacob K. Shafer on March 3, 1869.

== Death ==
After referring to fellow Democrat Charles Douglas as "a liar, a coward, and an assassin", they confronted each other in front of Holbrook's law office in Idaho City on June 17, 1870. After speaking to each other, they both drew revolvers and fired 11 shots, until they were both arrested. Holbrook was shot in the abdomen and died the next day. He was buried at the Masonic Burial Ground in Idaho City; his funeral was the largest held in the Idaho Territory, with around 600 attending.

After one hung jury, Douglas was acquitted of manslaughter.

== Electoral history ==
The Idaho Territory's at-large congressional district general election, 1864
Party	Candidate	Votes	%
Democratic	Edward D. Holbrook	4,639	53.3
Union	Samuel C. Parks	4,060	46.7
Total votes		8,699	100

The Idaho Territory's at-large congressional district general election, 1866
Party	Candidate	Votes	%
Democratic	Edward D. Holbrook	3,638	55.4
Republican	J. M. Kirkpatrick	2,923	44.6
Total votes		6,561	100

== See also ==
- List of assassinated American politicians
- List of United States representatives expelled, censured, or reprimanded

U.S. House of Representatives
Preceded by William H. Wallace	Delegate to the U.S. House of Representatives from Idaho Territory's at-large congressional district 1865–1869	Succeeded by Jacob K. Shafer
