= John Lewis Thomas Jr. =

American politician (1835–1893)

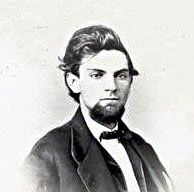

Member of the U.S. House of Representatives from Maryland's 2nd district
- In office December 4, 1865 – March 3, 1867
- Preceded by: Edwin H. Webster
- Succeeded by: Stevenson Archer

Personal details
- Born: May 20, 1835 Baltimore, Maryland, U.S.
- Died: October 15, 1893 (aged 58) Baltimore, Maryland, U.S.
- Resting place: Green Mount Cemetery, Baltimore, Maryland, U.S.
- Party: Unconditional Union
- Profession: Politician, lawyer

John Lewis Thomas Jr. (May 20, 1835 – October 15, 1893) was an American politician.

Born in Baltimore, Maryland, Thomas studied law and was admitted to the bar in 1856, commencing practice soon afterwards in Cumberland, Maryland. He also served as city counselor of Cumberland in 1856 and 1857. He moved to Baltimore in 1857, continued the practice of law, and also served as city solicitor of Baltimore from 1860 to 1862. He was a delegate to the State constitutional convention of 1863 and State's attorney from 1863 to 1865.

In 1865, Thomas was elected as an Unconditional Unionist to the Thirty-ninth Congress to fill the vacancy caused by the resignation of Edwin H. Webster and served from December 4, 1865, to March 3, 1867. He was an unsuccessful Republican candidate for reelection in 1866 to the Fortieth Congress. After Congress, he served as collector of the port of Baltimore from 1869 to 1873 and again from 1877 to 1882. He died in Baltimore and is interred in Green Mount Cemetery.

U.S. House of Representatives
Preceded by Edwin Hanson Webster	Member of the U.S. House of Representatives from Maryland's 2nd congressional district 1865–1867	Succeeded by Stevenson Archer
