= Delos R. Ashley =

American politician (1828–1873)

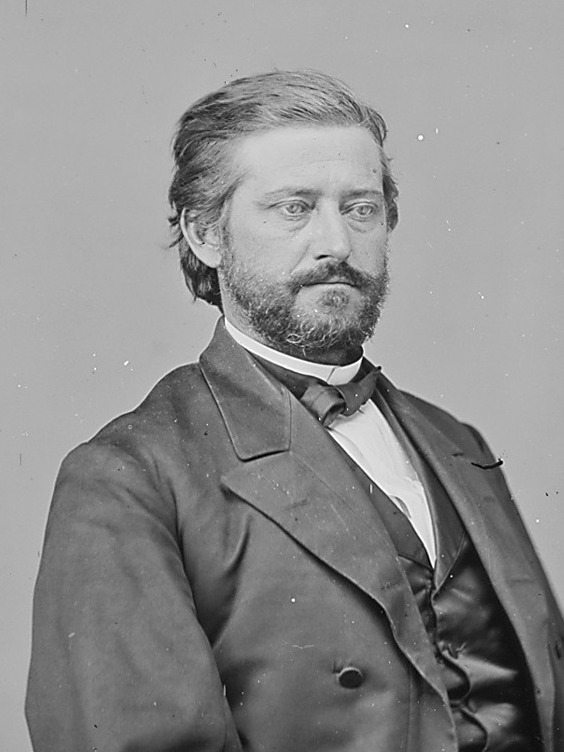

Member of the U.S. House of Representatives from Nevada's at-large district
- In office March 4, 1865 – March 3, 1869
- Preceded by: Henry G. Worthington
- Succeeded by: Thomas Fitch

6th Treasurer of California
- In office 1862–1863
- Governor: Leland Stanford
- Preceded by: Thomas Findley
- Succeeded by: Romualdo Pacheco

5th President pro tempore of the California State Senate
- In office 1856–1857
- Preceded by: Royal Sprague
- Succeeded by: Samuel H. Dosh

Member of the California State Senate from the 3rd district
- In office 1856–1857

Member of the California State Assembly from the 4th district
- In office 1854–1855

Personal details
- Born: February 19, 1828 Arkansas Post, Arkansas Territory
- Died: July 18, 1873 (aged 45) San Francisco, California
- Resting place: Holy Cross Cemetery, Colma, California
- Party: Democratic; Know Nothing; Republican
- Spouse: Annie (McNamara) Ashley
- Children: 4
- Profession: Attorney

Delos Rodeyn Ashley (February 19, 1828 – July 18, 1873) was a California and Nevada politician who served as State Treasurer of California and a member of the United States House of Representatives from Nevada.

== Biography ==
Ashley was born at Arkansas Post, Arkansas Territory, on February 19, 1828. He was the son of Chester Ashley, who was an attorney and later U.S. senator from Arkansas. He received his education in the local schools, then studied law with an attorney in Monroe, Michigan. He was admitted to the bar in 1849, and moved to Monterey, California, where he established a practice.

As a member of the Democratic Party, Ashley served as district attorney of Monterey County from 1851 to 1852. From 1854 to 1855 he represented the 3rd District in the California State Assembly. From 1856 to 1857 he served in the California State Senate as a member of the Know Nothings. During his senate term, he was the body's president pro tempore. He later became a Republican, and he served as California State Treasurer from 1862 to 1863.

In 1864, Ashley moved to Virginia City, Nevada. In 1865, news accounts indicated he had been a passenger aboard the steamship Yosemite when her boiler exploded, killing 55 and injuring and burning dozens more. Ashley was blown into the Sacramento River, and escaped the wreck by swimming to shore.

Later that year he was elected to the United States House of Representatives from Nevada's at-large district. He was reelected in 1866 and served from March 4, 1865, to March 3, 1869. He was not a candidate for reelection in 1868. During his Congressional service, Ashley was chairman of the Committee on Mines and Mining.

He moved to Pioche, Nevada, in 1871 and resumed practicing law. When his health began to fail in 1872, Ashley moved to San Francisco, California, where he lived in retirement until his death on July 18, 1873. He was buried at Calvary Cemetery in San Francisco, and was later part of a mass reburial of Calvary Cemetery remains at Holy Cross Catholic Cemetery in Colma, California, Section H.

== Family ==
Ashley was the husband of Annie (McNamara) Ashley. They were the parents of four children:

- Delos Richard Ashley (1852–1932)
- Annie Rosalie Ashley O'Connell (1854–1899), the wife of Daniel O'Connell
- Ida Inez Ashley Eddy (1861–1932)
- Victoria Frances Ashley (1864–1864)

Political offices
Preceded by Thomas Findley	Treasurer of California; 1862–1863	Succeeded by Romualdo Pacheco
U.S. House of Representatives
Preceded by Henry G. Worthington	Member of the U.S. House of Representatives from Nevada's at-large congressional district 1865–1869	Succeeded by Thomas Fitch
