= First ladies of Idaho =

Title of the spouse of the governor of Idaho

First Lady of Idaho
- Seal of Idaho

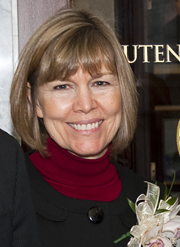
- Current; Teresa Little since January 7, 2019
- Style: Mrs. Little; Madam First Lady
- Residence: Pierce House
- Inaugural holder: Magdalena Shoup
- Formation: July 3, 1890 (136 years ago)
- Website: Official website

First Lady or First Gentleman of Idaho is the title attributed to the wife or husband of the governor of Idaho. The holder of the title resides with the governor at the Pierce House in Boise, Idaho.

The current first lady of Idaho is Teresa Little, wife of Governor Brad Little, who has held the position since January 7, 2019. To date, there has never been a first gentleman of the state of Idaho.

== List of first ladies of Idaho ==
First Ladies of the State of Idaho
| First Lady | Term begins | Term ends | Governor | Notes |
|---|---|---|---|---|
| Magdalena Shoup | December 8, 1890 | December 19, 1890 | George L. Shoup | |
| Vacant (Note: Governor Willey was never married.) | December 19, 1890 | January 2, 1893 | N. B. Willey | |
| Louisa McConnell | January 2, 1893 | January 4, 1897 | William J. McConnell | |
| Belle Steunenberg | January 4, 1897 | January 7, 1901 | Frank Steunenberg | |
| Ruth Hunt | January 7, 1901 | January 5, 1903 | Frank W. Hunt | |
| Grace Morrison | January 5, 1903 | January 2, 1905 | John T. Morrison | |
| Amanda Gooding | January 2, 1905 | January 4, 1909 | Frank R. Gooding | |
| Sarah Brady | January 4, 1909 | January 2, 1911 | James H. Brady | |
| Mary Hawley | January 2, 1911 | January 6, 1913 | James H. Hawley | |
| Mary Haines | January 6, 1913 | January 4, 1915 | John M. Haines | |
| Helena Alexander | January 4, 1915 | January 6, 1919 | Moses Alexander | |
| Nellie Davis | January 6, 1919 | January 1, 1923 | D. W. Davis | |
| Clara Moore | January 1, 1923 | January 3, 1927 | Charles C. Moore | |
| Cora Balridge | January 3, 1927 | January 5, 1931 | H. C. Baldridge | |
| Edna Ross | January 5, 1931 | January 4, 1937 | C. Ben Ross | |
| Ethel Clark | January 4, 1937 | January 2, 1939 | Barzilla W. Clark | |
| Elizabeth Bottolfsen | January 2, 1939 | January 6, 1941 | C. A. Bottolfsen | |
| Jean Clark | January 6, 1941 | January 4, 1943 | Chase Clark | |
| Elizabeth Bottolfsen | January 4, 1943 | January 1, 1945 | C. A. Bottolfsen | |
| Clara Gossett | January 1, 1945 | November 17, 1945 | Charles C. Gossett | |
| Luella Williams | November 17, 1945 | January 6, 1947 | Arnold Williams | |
| Olive Robins | January 6, 1947 | January 1, 1951 | C. A. Robins | |
| Grace Jordan | January 1, 1951 | January 3, 1955 | Len Jordan | |
| Lucille Smylie | January 3, 1955 | January 2, 1967 | Robert Smylie | |
| Ruby Samuelson | January 2, 1967 | January 4, 1971 | Don Samuelson | |
| Carol Andrus | January 4, 1971 | January 23, 1977 | Cecil Andrus | |
| Lola Evans | January 23, 1977 | January 5, 1987 | John Evans | |
| Carol Andrus | January 5, 1987 | January 2, 1995 | Cecil Andrus | |
| Jacque Batt | January 2, 1995 | January 4, 1999 | Phil Batt | |
| Patricia Kempthorne | January 8, 1999 | May 26, 2006 | Dirk Kempthorne | |
| Vicki Risch | May 26, 2006 | January 1, 2007 | Jim Risch | |
| Lori Otter | January 1, 2007 | January 7, 2019 | Butch Otter | |
| Teresa Little | January 7, 2019 | Current | Brad Little | |
