= Compton White =

Compton White may refer to:

- Compton I. White (1877–1956), US Representative from Idaho
- Compton I. White Jr. (1920–1998), US Representative from Idaho
