= List of United States representatives in the 88th Congress =

This is a complete list of United States representatives during the 88th United States Congress listed by seniority.

As an historical article, the districts and party affiliations listed reflect those during the 88th Congress (January 3, 1963 – January 3, 1965). Seats and party affiliations on similar lists for other congresses will be different for certain members.

Seniority depends on the date on which members were sworn into office. Since many members are sworn in on the same day, subsequent ranking is based on previous congressional service of the individual and then by alphabetical order by the last name of the representative.

Committee chairmanship in the House is often associated with seniority. However, party leadership is typically not associated with seniority.

Note: The "*" indicates that the representative/delegate may have served one or more non-consecutive terms while in the House of Representatives of the United States Congress.

== U.S. House seniority list ==
U.S. House seniority
Rank	Representative	Party	District	Seniority date (Previous service, if any)	No.# of term(s)	Notes
1	Carl Vinson	D	GA-06	November 3, 1914	26th term	Dean of the House; Left the House in 1965.
2	Clarence Cannon	D	MO-09	March 4, 1923	21st term	Died on May 12, 1964.
3	Emanuel Celler	D	NY-10	March 4, 1923	21st term	
4	Joseph William Martin Jr.	R	MA-10	March 4, 1925	20th term	
5	John William McCormack	D	MA-09	November 6, 1928	19th term	Speaker of the House
6	Wright Patman	D	TX-01	March 4, 1929	18th term	
7	Howard W. Smith	D	VA-08	March 4, 1931	17th term	
8	William M. Colmer	D	MS-05	March 4, 1933	16th term	
9	Francis E. Walter	D	PA-15	March 4, 1933	16th term	Died on May 31, 1963.
10	Harold D. Cooley	D	NC-04	July 7, 1934	16th term	
11	Leslie C. Arends	R	IL-17	January 3, 1935	15th term	
12	Charles A. Buckley	D	NY-23	January 3, 1935	15th term	Left the House in 1965.
13	George H. Mahon	D	TX-19	January 3, 1935	15th term	
14	Charles A. Halleck	R	IN-02	January 29, 1935	15th term	
15	Eugene James Keogh	D	NY-11	January 3, 1937	14th term	
16	Michael J. Kirwan	D	OH-19	January 3, 1937	14th term	
17	William R. Poage	D	TX-11	January 3, 1937	14th term	
18	Harry R. Sheppard	D	CA-33	January 3, 1937	14th term	Left the House in 1965.
19	Albert Thomas	D	TX-08	January 3, 1937	14th term	
20	George M. Grant	D	AL	June 14, 1938	14th term	Left the House in 1965.
21	Clarence J. Brown	R	OH-07	January 3, 1939	13th term	
22	Ezekiel C. Gathings	D	AR-01	January 3, 1939	13th term	
23	Ben F. Jensen	R	IA-07	January 3, 1939	13th term	Left the House in 1965.
24	John L. McMillan	D	SC-06	January 3, 1939	13th term	
25	Wilbur Mills	D	AR-02	January 3, 1939	13th term	
26	Clarence E. Kilburn	R	NY-31	February 13, 1940	13th term	Left the House in 1965.
27	Clifford Davis	D	TN-09	February 14, 1940	13th term	Left the House in 1965.
28	Frances P. Bolton	R	OH-22	February 27, 1940	13th term	
29	Herbert Covington Bonner	D	NC-01	November 5, 1940	13th term	
30	Oren Harris	D	AR-04	January 3, 1941	12th term	
31	Felix Edward Hébert	D	LA-01	January 3, 1941	12th term	
32	L. Mendel Rivers	D	SC-01	January 3, 1941	12th term	
33	Jamie Whitten	D	MS-02	November 4, 1941	12th term	
34	Cecil R. King	D	CA-17	August 25, 1942	12th term	
35	Thomas Abernethy	D	MS-01	January 3, 1943	11th term	
36	James C. Auchincloss	R	NJ-03	January 3, 1943	11th term	Left the House in 1965.
37	William L. Dawson	D	IL-01	January 3, 1943	11th term	
38	Michael A. Feighan	D	OH-20	January 3, 1943	11th term	
39	O. C. Fisher	D	TX-21	January 3, 1943	11th term	
40	Leon H. Gavin	R	PA-23	January 3, 1943	11th term	Died on September 15, 1963.
41	Charles B. Hoeven	R	IA-06	January 3, 1943	11th term	Left the House in 1965.
42	Chester E. Holifield	D	CA-19	January 3, 1943	11th term	
43	Walt Horan	R	WA-05	January 3, 1943	11th term	Left the House in 1965.
44	Ray Madden	D	IN-01	January 3, 1943	11th term	
45	James H. Morrison	D	LA-06	January 3, 1943	11th term	
46	Tom J. Murray	D	TN-07	January 3, 1943	11th term	
47	Thomas J. O'Brien	D	IL-06	January 3, 1943; Previous service, 1933–1939.	14th term*	Died on April 14, 1964.
48	Alvin O'Konski	R	WI-10	January 3, 1943	11th term	
49	Philip J. Philbin	D	MA-03	January 3, 1943	11th term	
50	W. Arthur Winstead	D	MS-04	January 3, 1943	11th term	Left the House in 1965.
51	George W. Andrews	D	AL	March 14, 1944	11th term	
52	John J. Rooney	D	NY-14	June 6, 1944	11th term	
53	John W. Byrnes	R	WI-08	January 3, 1945	10th term	
54	Frank Chelf	D	KY-04	January 3, 1945	10th term	
55	Robert J. Corbett	R	PA-18	January 3, 1945; Previous service, 1939–1941.	11th term*	
56	George Hyde Fallon	D	MD-04	January 3, 1945	10th term	
57	James G. Fulton	R	PA-27	January 3, 1945	10th term	
58	George Paul Miller	D	CA-08	January 3, 1945	10th term	
59	Thomas E. Morgan	D	PA-26	January 3, 1945	10th term	
60	Adam Clayton Powell Jr.	D	NY-18	January 3, 1945	10th term	
61	Charles Melvin Price	D	IL-24	January 3, 1945	10th term	
62	Albert Rains	D	AL	January 3, 1945	10th term	Left the House in 1965.
63	Robert L. F. Sikes	D	FL-01	January 3, 1945; Previous service, 1941–1944.	12th term*	
64	James William Trimble	D	AR-03	January 3, 1945	10th term	
65	John E. Fogarty	D	RI-02	February 7, 1945; Previous service, 1941–1944	12th term*	
66	J. Vaughan Gary	D	VA-03	March 6, 1945	10th term	Left the House in 1965.
67	A. Walter Norblad	R	OR-01	January 18, 1946	10th term	Died on September 20, 1964.
68	Olin E. Teague	D	TX-06	August 24, 1946	10th term	
69	Carl Albert	D	OK-03	January 3, 1947	9th term	
70	John B. Bennett	R	MI-12	January 3, 1947; Previous service, 1943–1945.	10th term*	Died on August 9, 1964.
71	John Blatnik	D	MN-08	January 3, 1947	9th term	
72	Hale Boggs	D	LA-02	January 3, 1947; Previous service, 1941–1943.	10th term*	
73	Omar Burleson	D	TX-17	January 3, 1947	9th term	
74	Paul B. Dague	R	PA-09	January 3, 1947	9th term	
75	Harold Donohue	D	MA-04	January 3, 1947	9th term	
76	Joe L. Evins	D	TN-04	January 3, 1947	9th term	
77	Katharine St. George	R	NY-27	January 3, 1947	9th term	Left the House in 1965.
78	Porter Hardy Jr.	D	VA-02	January 3, 1947	9th term	
79	Frank M. Karsten	D	MO-01	January 3, 1947	9th term	
80	Otto Passman	D	LA-05	January 3, 1947	9th term	
81	R. Walter Riehlman	R	NY-34	January 3, 1947	9th term	Left the House in 1965.
82	Thor C. Tollefson	R	WA-06	January 3, 1947	9th term	Left the House in 1965.
83	John Bell Williams	D	MS-03	January 3, 1947	9th term	
84	Robert E. Jones Jr.	D	AL	January 28, 1947	9th term	
85	Edward Garmatz	D	MD-03	July 15, 1947	9th term	
86	Clark W. Thompson	D	TX-09	August 23, 1947; Previous service, 1933–1935.	10th term*	
87	William Moore McCulloch	R	OH-04	November 4, 1947	9th term	
88	Abraham J. Multer	D	NY-13	November 4, 1947	9th term	
89	Watkins Moorman Abbitt	D	VA-04	February 17, 1948	9th term	
90	Paul C. Jones	D	MO-10	November 2, 1948	9th term	
91	Wayne N. Aspinall	D	CO-04	January 3, 1949	8th term	
92	William A. Barrett	D	PA-01	January 3, 1949; Previous service, 1945–1947.	9th term*	
93	Charles Edward Bennett	D	FL-02	January 3, 1949	8th term	
94	Richard Walker Bolling	D	MO-05	January 3, 1949	8th term	
95	James J. Delaney	D	NY-09	January 3, 1949; Previous service, 1945–1947.	9th term*	
96	Clyde Doyle	D	CA-23	January 3, 1949; Previous service, 1945–1947.	9th term*	Died on March 14, 1963.
97	Carl Elliott	D	AL	January 3, 1949	8th term	Left the House in 1965.
98	Gerald Ford	R	MI-05	January 3, 1949	8th term	
99	William J. Green Jr.	D	PA-05	January 3, 1949; Previous service, 1945–1947.	9th term*	Died on December 21, 1963.
100	Wayne Hays	D	OH-18	January 3, 1949	8th term	
101	Albert S. Herlong Jr.	D	FL-05	January 3, 1949	8th term	
102	H. R. Gross	R	IA-03	January 3, 1949	8th term	
103	Carl D. Perkins	D	KY-07	January 3, 1949	8th term	
104	George M. Rhodes	D	PA-06	January 3, 1949	8th term	
105	Peter W. Rodino	D	NJ-10	January 3, 1949	8th term	
106	Harley Orrin Staggers	D	WV-02	January 3, 1949	8th term	
107	Tom Steed	D	OK-04	January 3, 1949	8th term	
108	Homer Thornberry	D	TX-10	January 3, 1949	8th term	Resigned on December 20, 1963.
109	Edwin E. Willis	D	LA-03	January 3, 1949	8th term	
110	Clement J. Zablocki	D	WI-04	January 3, 1949	8th term	
111	John P. Saylor	R	PA-22	September 13, 1949	8th term	
112	Edna F. Kelly	D	NY-12	November 8, 1949	8th term	
113	John F. Shelley	D	CA-05	November 8, 1949	8th term	Resigned on January 7, 1964.
114	William B. Widnall	R	NJ-07	February 6, 1950	8th term	
115	William H. Bates	R	MA-06	February 14, 1950	8th term	
116	E. Ross Adair	R	IN-04	January 3, 1951	7th term	
117	William Hanes Ayres	R	OH-14	January 3, 1951	7th term	
118	Page Belcher	R	OK-01	January 3, 1951	7th term	
119	Howard Baker Sr.	R	TN-02	January 3, 1951	7th term	Died on January 7, 1964.
120	Ellis Yarnal Berry	R	SD-02	January 3, 1951	7th term	
121	Jackson Edward Betts	R	OH-08	January 3, 1951	7th term	
122	Frank T. Bow	R	OH-16	January 3, 1951	7th term	
123	William G. Bray	R	IN-07	January 3, 1951	7th term	
124	John Chenoweth	R	CO-03	January 3, 1951; Previous service, 1941–1949.	11th term*	Left the House in 1965.
125	Thomas B. Curtis	R	MO-02	January 3, 1951	7th term	
126	William Jennings Bryan Dorn	D	SC-03	January 3, 1951; Previous service, 1947–1949.	8th term*	
127	Tic Forrester	D	GA-03	January 3, 1951	7th term	Left the House in 1965.
128	John Jarman	D	OK-05	January 3, 1951	7th term	
129	John C. Kluczynski	D	IL-05	January 3, 1951	7th term	
130	John Lesinski Jr.	D	MI-16	January 3, 1951	7th term	Left the House in 1965.
131	George Meader	R	MI-02	January 3, 1951	7th term	Left the House in 1965.
132	William E. Miller	R	NY-40	January 3, 1951	7th term	Left the House in 1965.
133	Harold C. Ostertag	R	NY-37	January 3, 1951	7th term	Left the House in 1965.
134	Kenneth A. Roberts	D	AL	January 3, 1951	7th term	Left the House in 1965.
135	Byron G. Rogers	D	CO-01	January 3, 1951	7th term	
136	Walter E. Rogers	D	TX-18	January 3, 1951	7th term	
137	William L. Springer	R	IL-22	January 3, 1951	7th term	
138	William Van Pelt	R	WI-06	January 3, 1951	7th term	Left the House in 1965.
139	J. Ernest Wharton	R	NY-28	January 3, 1951	7th term	Left the House in 1965.
140	John C. Watts	D	KY-06	April 4, 1951	7th term	Left the House in 1965.
141	Elizabeth Kee	D	WV-05	July 17, 1951	7th term	Left the House in 1965.
142	Clifford McIntire	R	ME-02	October 22, 1951	7th term	Left the House in 1965.
143	Frank C. Osmers Jr.	R	NJ-09	November 6, 1951; Previous service, 1939–1943.	9th term*	Left the House in 1965.
144	Paul F. Schenck	R	OH-03	November 6, 1951	7th term	Left the House in 1965.
145	Leo W. O'Brien	D	NY-29	April 1, 1952	7th term	
146	John Dowdy	D	TX-07	September 23, 1952	7th term	
147	Frank J. Becker	R	NY-05	January 3, 1953	6th term	
148	Edward Boland	D	MA-02	January 3, 1953	6th term	
149	Jack Brooks	D	TX-02	January 3, 1953	6th term	
150	Joel Broyhill	R	VA-10	January 3, 1953	6th term	
151	James A. Byrne	D	PA-03	January 3, 1953	6th term	
152	Elford Albin Cederberg	R	MI-10	January 3, 1953	6th term	
153	Steven Derounian	R	NY-03	January 3, 1953	6th term	Left the House in 1965.
154	Ed Edmondson	D	OK-02	January 3, 1953	6th term	
155	Paul A. Fino	R	NY-24	January 3, 1953	6th term	
156	Lawrence H. Fountain	D	NC-02	January 3, 1953	6th term	
157	Peter Frelinghuysen Jr.	R	NJ-05	January 3, 1953	6th term	
158	Samuel Friedel	D	MD-07	January 3, 1953	6th term	
159	Charles S. Gubser	R	CA-10	January 3, 1953	6th term	
160	Harlan Hagen	D	CA-18	January 3, 1953	6th term	
161	James A. Haley	D	FL-07	January 3, 1953	6th term	
162	Craig Hosmer	R	CA-32	January 3, 1953	6th term	
163	Charles R. Jonas	R	NC-08	January 3, 1953	6th term	
164	Victor A. Knox	R	MI-11	January 3, 1953	6th term	Left the House in 1965.
165	Melvin Laird	R	WI-07	January 3, 1953	6th term	
166	Phillip M. Landrum	D	GA-09	January 3, 1953	6th term	
167	William S. Mailliard	R	CA-06	January 3, 1953	6th term	
168	Donald Ray Matthews	D	FL-08	January 3, 1953	6th term	
169	John E. Moss	D	CA-03	January 3, 1953	6th term	
170	Barratt O'Hara	D	IL-02	January 3, 1953; Previous service, 1949–1951.	7th term*	
171	Tip O'Neill	D	MA-08	January 3, 1953	6th term	
172	Thomas Pelly	R	WA-01	January 3, 1953	6th term	
173	John R. Pillion	R	NY-39	January 3, 1953	6th term	Left the House in 1965.
174	Richard Harding Poff	R	VA-06	January 3, 1953	6th term	
175	John J. Rhodes	R	AZ-01	January 3, 1953	6th term	
176	Armistead I. Selden Jr.	D	AL	January 3, 1953	6th term	
177	Leonor Sullivan	D	MO-03	January 3, 1953	6th term	
178	T. Ashton Thompson	D	LA-07	January 3, 1953	6th term	
179	James B. Utt	R	CA-35	January 3, 1953	6th term	
180	Jack Westland	R	WA-02	January 3, 1953	6th term	Left the House in 1965.
181	Bob Wilson	R	CA-36	January 3, 1953	6th term	
182	J. Arthur Younger	R	CA-11	January 3, 1953	6th term	
183	J. L. Pilcher	D	GA-02	February 4, 1953	6th term	Left the House in 1965.
184	William M. Tuck	D	VA-05	April 14, 1953	6th term	
185	Robert T. Ashmore	D	SC-04	June 2, 1953	6th term	
186	William Natcher	D	KY-02	August 1, 1953	6th term	
187	Lester Johnson	D	WI-09	October 13, 1953	6th term	Left the House in 1965.
188	Glenard P. Lipscomb	R	CA-24	November 10, 1953	6th term	
189	John James Flynt Jr.	D	GA-04	November 2, 1954	6th term	
190	Bruce Alger	R	TX-05	January 3, 1955	5th term	Left the House in 1965.
191	Thomas W. L. Ashley	D	OH-09	January 3, 1955	5th term	
192	William H. Avery	R	KS-02	January 3, 1955	5th term	Left the House in 1965.
193	John F. Baldwin Jr.	R	CA-14	January 3, 1955	5th term	
194	Ross Bass	D	TN-06	January 3, 1955	5th term	Resigned on November 3, 1964.
195	Frank M. Clark	D	PA-25	January 3, 1955	5th term	
196	William C. Cramer	R	FL-12	January 3, 1955	5th term	
197	Winfield K. Denton	D	IN-08	January 3, 1955; Previous service, 1949–1953.	7th term*	
198	Charles Diggs	D	MI-13	January 3, 1955	5th term	
199	Dante Fascell	D	FL-04	January 3, 1955	5th term	
200	Daniel J. Flood	D	PA-11	January 3, 1955; Previous service, 1945–1947 and 1949–1953.	8th term**	
201	Kenneth J. Gray	D	IL-21	January 3, 1955	5th term	
202	Edith Green	D	OR-03	January 3, 1955	5th term	
203	Martha Griffiths	D	MI-17	January 3, 1955	5th term	
204	George Huddleston Jr.	D	AL	January 3, 1955	5th term	Left the House in 1965.
205	William Raleigh Hull Jr.	D	MO-06	January 3, 1955	5th term	
206	W. Pat Jennings	D	VA-09	January 3, 1955	5th term	
207	August E. Johansen	R	MI-03	January 3, 1955	5th term	Left the House in 1965.
208	Joe M. Kilgore	D	TX-15	January 3, 1955	5th term	Left the House in 1965.
209	Richard Lankford	D	MD-05	January 3, 1955	5th term	Left the House in 1965.
210	Torbert Macdonald	D	MA-07	January 3, 1955	5th term	
211	William Edwin Minshall Jr.	R	OH-23	January 3, 1955	5th term	
212	Henry S. Reuss	D	WI-05	January 3, 1955	5th term	
213	James Roosevelt	D	CA-26	January 3, 1955	5th term	
214	Fred Schwengel	R	IA-01	January 3, 1955	5th term	Left the House in 1965.
215	Eugene Siler	R	KY-05	January 3, 1955	5th term	Left the House in 1965.
216	Bernice F. Sisk	D	CA-16	January 3, 1955	5th term	
217	Charles M. Teague	R	CA-13	January 3, 1955	5th term	
218	Frank Thompson	D	NJ-04	January 3, 1955	5th term	
219	Charles Vanik	D	OH-21	January 3, 1955	5th term	
220	Jim Wright	D	TX-12	January 3, 1955	5th term	
221	Paul Rogers	D	FL-06	January 11, 1955	5th term	
222	John Dingell	D	MI-15	December 13, 1955	5th term	
223	Elmer J. Holland	D	PA-20	January 24, 1956; Previous service, 1942–1943.	6th term*	
224	James C. Healey	D	NY-21	February 7, 1956	5th term	Left the House in 1965.
225	Walter S. Baring Jr.	D	NV	January 3, 1957; Previous service, 1949–1953.	6th term*	
226	Lindley Beckworth	D	TX-03	January 3, 1957; Previous service, 1939–1953.	11th term*	
227	William Broomfield	R	MI-18	January 3, 1957	4th term	
228	Charles E. Chamberlain	R	MI-06	January 3, 1957	4th term	
229	Harold R. Collier	R	IL-10	January 3, 1957	4th term	
230	Glenn Cunningham	R	NE-02	January 3, 1957	4th term	
231	Willard S. Curtin	R	PA-08	January 3, 1957	4th term	
232	Florence P. Dwyer	R	NJ-06	January 3, 1957	4th term	
233	Leonard Farbstein	D	NY-19	January 3, 1957	4th term	
234	Robert P. Griffin	R	MI-09	January 3, 1957	4th term	
235	Robert W. Hemphill	D	SC-05	January 3, 1957	4th term	Resigned on May 1, 1964.
236	Alton Lennon	D	NC-07	January 3, 1957	4th term	
237	John J. McFall	D	CA-15	January 3, 1957	4th term	
238	Robert Michel	R	IL-18	January 3, 1957	4th term	
239	Arch A. Moore Jr.	R	WV-01	January 3, 1957	4th term	
240	Ralph James Scott	D	NC-05	January 3, 1957	4th term	
241	H. Allen Smith	R	CA-20	January 3, 1957	4th term	
242	Al Ullman	D	OR-02	January 3, 1957	4th term	
243	Basil Lee Whitener	D	NC-10	January 3, 1957	4th term	
244	John Andrew Young	D	TX-14	January 3, 1957	4th term	
245	Joseph Montoya	D	NM	April 9, 1957	4th term	Resigned on November 3, 1964.
246	Milton W. Glenn	R	NJ-02	November 5, 1957	4th term	Left the House in 1965.
247	Roland V. Libonati	D	IL-07	December 31, 1957	4th term	Left the House in 1965.
248	Howard W. Robison	R	NY-33	January 14, 1958	4th term	
249	John Herman Dent	D	PA-21	January 21, 1958	4th term	
250	Fats Everett	D	TN-08	February 1, 1958	4th term	
251	Al Quie	R	MN-01	February 18, 1958	4th term	
252	Robert N.C. Nix Sr.	D	PA-02	May 20, 1958	4th term	
253	Robert R. Barry	R	NY-25	January 3, 1959	3rd term	Left the House in 1965.
254	John Brademas	D	IN-03	January 3, 1959	3rd term	
255	James A. Burke	D	MA-11	January 3, 1959	3rd term	
256	William T. Cahill	R	NJ-01	January 3, 1959	3rd term	
257	Robert R. Casey	D	TX-22	January 3, 1959	3rd term	
258	Jeffery Cohelan	D	CA-07	January 3, 1959	3rd term	
259	Silvio O. Conte	R	MA-01	January 3, 1959	3rd term	
260	Emilio Q. Daddario	D	CT-01	January 3, 1959	3rd term	
261	Dominick V. Daniels	D	NJ-14	January 3, 1959	3rd term	
262	Ed Derwinski	R	IL-04	January 3, 1959	3rd term	
263	Samuel L. Devine	R	OH-12	January 3, 1959	3rd term	
264	Thomas N. Downing	D	VA-01	January 3, 1959	3rd term	
265	Thaddeus J. Dulski	D	NY-41	January 3, 1959	3rd term	
266	Cornelius Edward Gallagher	D	NJ-13	January 3, 1959	3rd term	
267	Robert Giaimo	D	CT-03	January 3, 1959	3rd term	
268	Seymour Halpern	R	NY-06	January 3, 1959	3rd term	
269	Ken Hechler	D	WV-04	January 3, 1959	3rd term	
270	Elmer J. Hoffman	R	IL-14	January 3, 1959	3rd term	Left the House in 1965.
271	Harold T. Johnson	D	CA-02	January 3, 1959	3rd term	
272	Joseph Karth	D	MN-04	January 3, 1959	3rd term	
273	Robert Kastenmeier	D	WI-02	January 3, 1959	3rd term	
274	Hastings Keith	R	MA-12	January 3, 1959	3rd term	
275	Odin Langen	R	MN-07	January 3, 1959	3rd term	
276	Del Latta	R	OH-05	January 3, 1959	3rd term	
277	John Lindsay	R	NY-17	January 3, 1959	3rd term	
278	Catherine Dean May	R	WA-04	January 3, 1959	3rd term	
279	Harris B. McDowell Jr.	D	DE	January 3, 1959; Previous service, 1955–1957.	4th term*	
280	William H. Milliken Jr.	R	PA-07	January 3, 1959	3rd term	Left the House in 1965.
281	John S. Monagan	D	CT-05	January 3, 1959	3rd term	
282	William S. Moorhead	D	PA-14	January 3, 1959	3rd term	
283	Thomas G. Morris	D	NM	January 3, 1959	3rd term	
284	William T. Murphy	D	IL-03	January 3, 1959	3rd term	
285	Ancher Nelsen	R	MN-02	January 3, 1959	3rd term	
286	James G. O'Hara	D	MI-07	January 3, 1959	3rd term	
287	Alexander Pirnie	R	NY-32	January 3, 1959	3rd term	
288	Roman C. Pucinski	D	IL-11	January 3, 1959	3rd term	
289	Ralph Julian Rivers	D	AK	January 3, 1959	3rd term	
290	Dan Rostenkowski	D	IL-08	January 3, 1959	3rd term	
291	J. Edward Roush	D	IN-05	January 3, 1959	3rd term	
292	George E. Shipley	D	IL-23	January 3, 1959	3rd term	
293	Don L. Short	R	ND-02	January 3, 1959	3rd term	Left the House in 1965.
294	John M. Slack Jr.	D	WV-03	January 3, 1959	3rd term	
295	Neal Smith	D	IA-05	January 3, 1959	3rd term	
296	Samuel S. Stratton	D	NY-35	January 3, 1959	3rd term	
297	Frank Stubblefield	D	KY-01	January 3, 1959	3rd term	
298	Herman Toll	D	PA-04	January 3, 1959	3rd term	
299	George M. Wallhauser	R	NJ-12	January 3, 1959	3rd term	Left the House in 1965.
300	William J. Randall	D	MO-04	March 3, 1959	3rd term	
301	Charles Goodell	R	NY-38	May 26, 1959	3rd term	
302	John Henry Kyl	R	IA-04	December 15, 1959	3rd term	Left the House in 1965.
303	Jacob H. Gilbert	D	NY-22	March 8, 1960	3rd term	
304	Herman T. Schneebeli	R	PA-17	April 26, 1960	3rd term	
305	Roy A. Taylor	D	NC-11	June 25, 1960	3rd term	
306	Julia Butler Hansen	D	WA-03	November 8, 1960	3rd term	
307	J. Irving Whalley	R	PA-12	November 8, 1960	3rd term	
308	Joseph Patrick Addabbo	D	NY-07	January 3, 1961	2nd term	
309	John B. Anderson	R	IL-16	January 3, 1961	2nd term	
310	John M. Ashbrook	R	OH-17	January 3, 1961	2nd term	
311	James F. Battin	R	MT-02	January 3, 1961	2nd term	
312	Ralph F. Beermann	R	NE-01	January 3, 1961	2nd term	Left the House in 1965.
313	Alphonzo E. Bell Jr.	R	CA-28	January 3, 1961	2nd term	
314	James E. Bromwell	R	IA-02	January 3, 1961	2nd term	Left the House in 1965.
315	Donald C. Bruce	R	IN-11	January 3, 1961	2nd term	Left the House in 1965.
316	Hugh Carey	D	NY-15	January 3, 1961	2nd term	
317	Donald D. Clancy	R	OH-02	January 3, 1961	2nd term	
318	James C. Corman	D	CA-22	January 3, 1961	2nd term	
319	John W. Davis	D	GA-07	January 3, 1961	2nd term	
320	Bob Dole	R	KS-01	January 3, 1961	2nd term	
321	Robert Ellsworth	R	KS-03	January 3, 1961	2nd term	
322	Paul Findley	R	IL-20	January 3, 1961	2nd term	
323	Edward Rowan Finnegan	D	IL-09	January 3, 1961	2nd term	Resigned on December 6, 1964.
324	Fernand St. Germain	D	RI-01	January 3, 1961	2nd term	
325	George Atlee Goodling	R	PA-19	January 3, 1961	2nd term	Left the House in 1965.
326	George Elliott Hagan	D	GA-01	January 3, 1961	2nd term	
327	Durward Gorham Hall	R	MO-07	January 3, 1961	2nd term	
328	Ralph R. Harding	D	ID-02	January 3, 1961	2nd term	Left the House in 1965.
329	William H. Harrison	R	WY	January 3, 1961; Previous service, 1951–1955.	4th term*	Left the House in 1965.
330	Bill Harsha	R	OH-06	January 3, 1961	2nd term	
331	R. James Harvey	R	MI-08	January 3, 1961	2nd term	
332	Ralph Harvey	R	IN-10	January 3, 1961; Previous service, 1947–1959.	8th term*	
333	David N. Henderson	D	NC-03	January 3, 1961	2nd term	
334	Richard Howard Ichord Jr.	D	MO-08	January 3, 1961	2nd term	
335	Charles Samuel Joelson	D	NJ-08	January 3, 1961	2nd term	
336	Carleton J. King	R	NY-30	January 3, 1961	2nd term	
337	Horace R. Kornegay	D	NC-06	January 3, 1961	2nd term	
338	Clark MacGregor	R	MN-03	January 3, 1961	2nd term	
339	David Martin	R	NE-03	January 3, 1961	2nd term	
340	Charles Mathias	D	MD-06	January 3, 1961	2nd term	
341	F. Bradford Morse	R	MA-05	January 3, 1961	2nd term	
342	Charles Adams Mosher	R	OH-13	January 3, 1961	2nd term	
343	Hjalmar Carl Nygaard	R	ND-01	January 3, 1961	2nd term	Died on July 18, 1963.
344	Arnold Olsen	D	MT-01	January 3, 1961	2nd term	
345	Otis G. Pike	D	NY-01	January 3, 1961	2nd term	
346	Ben Reifel	R	SD-01	January 3, 1961	2nd term	
347	Richard L. Roudebush	R	IN-06	January 3, 1961	2nd term	
348	William Fitts Ryan	D	NY-20	January 3, 1961	2nd term	
349	Henry C. Schadeberg	R	WI-01	January 3, 1961	2nd term	Left the House in 1965.
350	Richard Schweiker	R	PA-13	January 3, 1961	2nd term	
351	Garner E. Shriver	R	KS-04	January 3, 1961	2nd term	
352	Abner W. Sibal	R	CT-04	January 3, 1961	2nd term	Left the House in 1965.
353	Robert Stafford	R	VT	January 3, 1961	2nd term	
354	Robert Grier Stephens Jr.	D	GA-10	January 3, 1961	2nd term	
355	Vernon Wallace Thomson	R	WI-03	January 3, 1961	2nd term	
356	Stanley R. Tupper	R	ME-01	January 3, 1961	2nd term	
357	Victor Wickersham	D	OK-06	January 3, 1961; Previous service, 1941–1947 and 1949–1957.	9th term**	Left the House in 1965.
358	Earl Wilson	R	IN-09	January 3, 1961; Previous service, 1941–1959.	11th term*	Left the House in 1965.
359	Mo Udall	D	AZ-02	May 2, 1961	2nd term	
360	John C. Kunkel	R	PA-16	May 16, 1961; Previous service, 1939–1951.	8th term*	
361	Henry B. González	D	TX-20	November 4, 1961	2nd term	
362	Lucien N. Nedzi	D	MI-01	November 7, 1961	2nd term	
363	Joe Waggonner	D	LA-04	December 19, 1961	2nd term	
364	Graham B. Purcell Jr.	D	TX-13	January 27, 1962	2nd term	
365	Ray Roberts	D	TX-04	January 30, 1962	2nd term	
366	Harold M. Ryan	D	MI-14	February 13, 1962	2nd term	Left the House in 1965.
367	Benjamin S. Rosenthal	D	NY-08	February 20, 1962	2nd term	
368	Pete Abele	R	OH-10	January 3, 1963	1st term	Left the House in 1965.
369	Oliver P. Bolton	R	OH-11	January 3, 1963; Previous service, 1953–1957.	3rd term*	Left the House in 1965.
370	Bill Brock	R	TN-03	January 3, 1963	1st term	
371	Donald G. Brotzman	R	CO-02	January 3, 1963	1st term	Left the House in 1965.
372	George Brown Jr.	D	CA-29	January 3, 1963	1st term	
373	Jim Broyhill	R	NC-09	January 3, 1963	1st term	
374	Everett G. Burkhalter	D	CA-27	January 3, 1963	1st term	Left the House in 1965.
375	Laurence J. Burton	R	UT-01	January 3, 1963	1st term	
376	Ronald B. Cameron	D	CA-25	January 3, 1963	1st term	
377	James Colgate Cleveland	R	NH-02	January 3, 1963	1st term	
378	Lionel Van Deerlin	D	CA-37	January 3, 1963	1st term	
379	Robert B. Duncan	D	OR-04	January 3, 1963	1st term	
380	Don Edwards	D	CA-09	January 3, 1963	1st term	
381	Ed Foreman	R	TX-16	January 3, 1963	1st term	Left the House in 1965.
382	Donald M. Fraser	D	MN-05	January 3, 1963	1st term	
383	Richard Fulton	D	TN-05	January 3, 1963	1st term	
384	Don Fuqua	D	FL-09	January 3, 1963	1st term	
385	Sam Gibbons	D	FL-10	January 3, 1963	1st term	
386	Thomas Gill	D	HI	January 3, 1963	1st term	Left the House in 1965.
387	Bernard F. Grabowski	D	CT	January 3, 1963	1st term	
388	James R. Grover	R	NY-02	January 3, 1963	1st term	
389	Edward Gurney	R	FL-11	January 3, 1963	1st term	
390	Richard T. Hanna	D	CA-34	January 3, 1963	1st term	
391	Augustus F. Hawkins	D	CA-21	January 3, 1963	1st term	
392	Frank Horton	R	NY-36	January 3, 1963	1st term	
393	J. Edward Hutchinson	R	MI-04	January 3, 1963	1st term	
394	Robert L. Leggett	D	CA-04	January 3, 1963	1st term	
395	Sherman P. Lloyd	R	UT-02	January 3, 1963	1st term	Left the House in 1965.
396	Clarence Long	D	MD-02	January 3, 1963	1st term	
397	Gillis W. Long	D	LA-08	January 3, 1963	1st term	Left the House in 1965.
398	John Otho Marsh Jr.	D	VA-07	January 3, 1963	1st term	
399	Patrick M. Martin	R	CA-38	January 3, 1963	1st term	Left the House in 1965.
400	Spark Matsunaga	D	HI	January 3, 1963	1st term	
401	Robert McClory	R	IL-12	January 3, 1963	1st term	
402	Joseph McDade	R	PA-10	January 3, 1963	1st term	
403	Robert T. McLoskey	R	IL-19	January 3, 1963	1st term	Left the House in 1965.
404	Joseph Minish	D	NJ-11	January 3, 1963	1st term	
405	Rogers Morton	R	MD-01	January 3, 1963	1st term	
406	John M. Murphy	D	NY-16	January 3, 1963	1st term	
407	Alec G. Olson	D	MN-06	January 3, 1963	1st term	
408	William St. Onge	D	CT-02	January 3, 1963	1st term	
409	Jimmy Quillen	R	TN-01	January 3, 1963	1st term	
410	Edward J. Patten	D	NJ-15	January 3, 1963	1st term	
411	Claude Pepper	D	FL-03	January 3, 1963	1st term	
412	Joe R. Pool	D	TX	January 3, 1963	1st term	
413	Charlotte Thompson Reid	R	IL-15	January 3, 1963	1st term	
414	Ogden Reid	R	NY-26	January 3, 1963	1st term	
415	Carl West Rich	R	OH-01	January 3, 1963	1st term	Left the House in 1965.
416	Edward R. Roybal	D	CA-30	January 3, 1963	1st term	
417	Donald Rumsfeld	R	IL-13	January 3, 1963	1st term	
418	Robert T. Secrest	D	OH-15	January 3, 1963; Previous service, 1933–1942 and 1949–1954.	9th term**	
419	George F. Senner Jr.	D	AZ-03	January 3, 1963	1st term	
420	Carlton R. Sickles	D	MD	January 3, 1963	1st term	
421	Joe Skubitz	R	KS-05	January 3, 1963	1st term	
422	Gene Snyder	R	KY-03	January 3, 1963	1st term	Left the House in 1965.
423	Neil Staebler	D	MI	January 3, 1963	1st term	Left the House in 1965.
424	K. William Stinson	R	WA-07	January 3, 1963	1st term	Left the House in 1965.
425	Robert Taft Jr.	R	OH	January 3, 1963	1st term	Left the House in 1965.
426	Burt L. Talcott	R	CA-12	January 3, 1963	1st term	
427	J. Russell Tuten	D	GA-08	January 3, 1963	1st term	
428	Albert Watson	D	SC-02	January 3, 1963	1st term	
429	James D. Weaver	R	PA-24	January 3, 1963	1st term	Left the House in 1965.
430	Charles L. Weltner	D	GA-05	January 3, 1963	1st term	
431	Compton I. White Jr.	D	ID-01	January 3, 1963	1st term	
432	Charles H. Wilson	D	CA-31	January 3, 1963	1st term	
433	John W. Wydler	R	NY-04	January 3, 1963	1st term	
434	Louis C. Wyman	R	NH-01	January 3, 1963	1st term	Left the House in 1965.
	Don H. Clausen	R	CA-01	January 22, 1963	1st term	
	Del M. Clawson	R	CA-23	June 11, 1963	1st term	
	Fred B. Rooney	D	PA-15	July 30, 1963	1st term	
	Mark Andrews	R	ND-01	October 22, 1963	1st term	
	Albert W. Johnson	R	PA-23	November 5, 1963	1st term	
	J. J. Pickle	D	TX-10	December 21, 1963	1st term	
	Phillip Burton	D	CA-05	February 18, 1964	1st term	
	Irene Baker	R	TN-02	March 10, 1964	1st term	Left the House in 1965.
	William J. Green, III	D	PA-05	April 28, 1964	1st term	
	Thomas S. Gettys	D	SC-05	November 3, 1964	1st term	
	William L. Hungate	D	MO-09	November 3, 1964	1st term	
	Wendell Wyatt	R	OR-01	November 3, 1964	1st term	

== Delegates ==
Rank	Delegate	Party	District	Seniority date (Previous service, if any)	No.# of term(s)	Notes
1	Antonio Fernós-Isern	D	PR	September 11, 1946	10th term	

== See also ==
- 88th United States Congress
- List of United States congressional districts
- List of United States senators in the 88th Congress
