= Abe Goff =

American politician

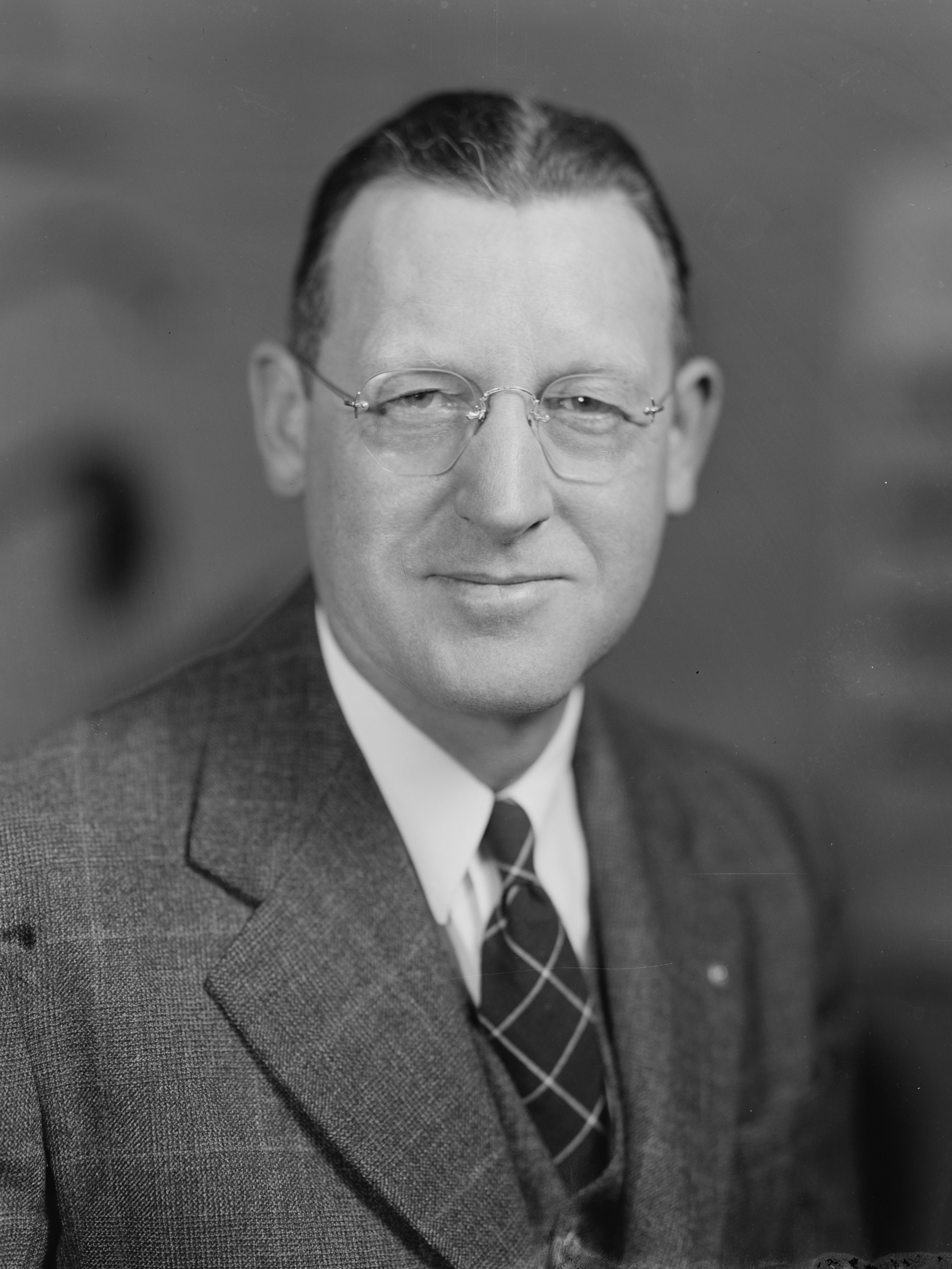
- Goff in 1947

Member of the U.S. House of Representatives from Idaho's 1st district
- In office January 3, 1947 – January 3, 1949
- Preceded by: Compton White Sr.
- Succeeded by: Compton White Sr.

Personal details
- Born: Abe McGregor Goff; December 21, 1899 Colfax, Washington, U.S.
- Died: November 23, 1984 (aged 84) Moscow, Idaho, U.S.
- Resting place: Moscow Cemetery; Moscow, Idaho
- Party: Republican
- Spouse(s): Florence Letitia Richardson Goff (1892–1987) (m.1927–1984, his death)
- Children: 2
- Education: University of Idaho (LLB)
- Profession: Attorney

Military service
- Allegiance: United States
- Branch/service: U.S. Army
- Years of service: 1918; 1941–1946
- Rank: Colonel
- Battles/wars: World War I (training), World War II

Abe McGregor Goff (December 21, 1899 – November 23, 1984) was an attorney and Republican politician from the U.S. state of Idaho, most notably as a one-term congressman from 1947 to 1949. He served in the U.S. Army in both world wars.

== Early years ==
Goff was born and raised in Colfax, Washington, in the Palouse region, the fourth son of Herbert W. and Mary (Dorsey) Goff. After graduating from high school in 1918, he enlisted in the U.S. Army as a private and underwent preliminary officer training at the University of Idaho in Moscow during the last weeks of World War I. Discharged from the military in December, he entered the law school at the UI in January 1919 and graduated in 1924. He was also the center on the Vandals football team. and was a member of Beta Theta Pi fraternity. His older brothers attended Washington State College (now University) in nearby Pullman.

== Early career ==
Goff commenced practice in Moscow the same year and was the prosecuting attorney for Latah County from 1926 to 1934. He also worked as a special lecturer at the UI law school from 1933 to 1941. In 1940, he was made president of the Idaho Bar Association. In 1941, Goff was elected to the Idaho Senate, after failing to win the Republican nomination for the United States Senate.

== World War II ==
Later the same year, he was activated as a member of the U.S. Army Reserves as a major, and served in the Mediterranean, European, and Pacific theaters. Goff was on General MacArthur's staff at the end of the war and was discharged as a colonel in 1946. While in the military, he was awarded the Legion of Merit.

== Congress ==
In 1946, Goff was elected to Congress as a Republican, narrowly defeating seven-term incumbent Compton White of Clark Fork. He served only one term, as White defeated him in 1948 and reclaimed the seat for a term.

U.S. House elections (Idaho's 1st district): Results 1946–1948
Year	Democrat	Votes	Pct	Republican	Votes	Pct	3rd Party	Party	Votes	Pct	
1946	Compton White (inc.)	36,509	49.4%	Abe M. Goff	37,326	50.6%					
1948	Compton White	46,846	51.8%	Abe M. Goff (inc.)	41,404	45.7%	Thomas B. Wood	Progressive	2,176	2.4%	^

Source: ^ 1948 election included 93 votes (0.1%) for Socialist Party candidate Richard M. Shaefer.

== After Congress ==
After leaving the House, Goff ran for the U.S. Senate in 1950, but appointed incumbent Henry Dworshak won the nomination in the August primary. Goff served as Idaho Republican Party Veterans Committee chairman in 1952. He then took a number of government posts in Washington, D.C.: he was general counsel of the Post Office Department, and later served on the Interstate Commerce Commission, from 1954 to 1967. After his terms ended, Goff retired to the Palouse in Idaho, working as a writer and lecturer in Moscow until his death in 1984.

== Personal life ==
Goff married Florence Letitia Richardson (1892–1987) of Moscow in 1927. They were married for 57 years and are buried at Moscow Cemetery, east of the city. They had two children: Timothy Richardson Goff (1932–72) and Annie McGregor Goff (1935–2018).

U.S. House of Representatives
Preceded by Compton I. White Sr.	United States House of Representatives, Idaho First Congressional District; January 3, 1947–January 3, 1949	Succeeded by Compton I. White Sr.
