= Gracie Pfost =

American politician (1906–1965)

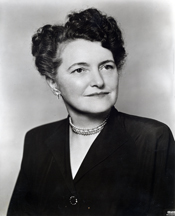

Member of the U.S. House of Representatives from Idaho's 1st district
- In office January 3, 1953 – January 3, 1963
- Preceded by: John Travers Wood
- Succeeded by: Compton I. White Jr.

Personal details
- Born: Gracie Bowers; March 12, 1906 Harrison, Arkansas, U.S.
- Died: August 11, 1965 (aged 59) Baltimore, Maryland, U.S.
- Party: Democratic
- Spouse: Jack Pfost (m. 1923–1961)
- Education: Link's Business College (AA)

Gracie Bowers Pfost (March 12, 1906 – August 11, 1965) was the first woman to represent Idaho in the United States Congress, serving five terms as a Democrat in the House of Representatives. Pfost represented the state's 1st district from 1953 to 1963.

== Early years ==
Born in an Ozark Mountain log cabin in Harrison, Arkansas, Pfost was five when her parents moved to a farm near Boise, Idaho, in 1911. One of five siblings, she quit Meridian High School at 16 in 1922 and worked as a milk analyst at a dairy in Nampa. The next year she married her supervisor, Jack Pfost, who was more than twice her age. She graduated from Link's Business College in Boise in 1929.

=== Early political career ===
Pfost entered politics in Canyon County; she held several positions in county government between 1929 and 1951, including deputy county clerk, auditor, recorder of deeds, and county treasurer. She also served as an Idaho delegate to all Democratic National Conventions between 1944 and 1960.

== Congress ==
In 1950, Pfost ran for Congress and won the Democratic nomination over Harry Wall of Lewiston, but narrowly lost to Republican John Travers Wood, a physician from Coeur d'Alene. In 1952, she defeated former eight-term Congressman Compton White, Sr. of Clark Fork in the Democratic primary and unseated Wood in another close general election. Pfost was reelected in 1954, 1956, 1958, and 1960. The "Hell's Belle" of Congress, she was a moderately liberal Democrat, who earned her nickname in her first year, fighting for a large federal dam on the Snake River in Hells Canyon. After years of debate, the single high dam was ultimately defeated and built as a three-dam complex (Brownlee, Oxbow, Hells Canyon) by the local private utility, Idaho Power.

U.S. House elections (Idaho's 1st district): Results 1950–1960
Year	Democrat	Votes	Pct	Republican	Votes	Pct
1950	Gracie Pfost	41,040	49.5%	John T. Wood	41,823	50.5%
1952	Gracie Pfost	54,725	50.3%	John T. Wood (inc.)	54,134	49.7%
1954	Gracie Pfost (inc.)	50,214	54.9%	Erwin Schwiebert	41,293	45.1%
1956	Gracie Pfost (inc.)	60,170	55.1%	Louise Shadduck	48,974	44.9%
1958	Gracie Pfost (inc.)	60,083	62.4%	A.B. Curtis	36,178	37.6%
1960	Gracie Pfost (inc.)	68,863	60.4%	Thomas A. Leupp	45,166	39.6%

=== Run for Senate ===
Though her House seat was considered secure, the death of Henry Dworshak in July 1962 prompted Pfost to run for his seat in the U.S. Senate. She was the Democratic nominee in the special election, but was narrowly defeated (51% to 49%) by the appointed Republican incumbent, former Governor Len Jordan Despite Democrat Frank Church winning re-election to the state's other senate seat . The election took place shortly after the Cuban Missile Crisis of late October; Jordan was re-elected in 1966 and retired at the end of that term, in early 1973.

Pfost's congressional seat was won by six points by Democrat Compton White, Jr. of Clark Fork, the 41-year-old namesake son of the late eight-term congressman. Idaho's other House seat also went to young Democrat, as 33-year-old Ralph Harding of Blackfoot won a second term. Idaho's other U.S. Senate seat (class 3) was also on the ballot, with 38-year-old Democrat Frank Church of Boise re-elected to the second of four terms.

To date, Dworshak's seat (class 2), earlier held by William Borah for over three decades, has been continuously held by Republicans for over 76 years (since October 1949), and Idaho has yet to elect a woman to the U.S. Senate.

U.S. Senate elections in Idaho (Class II): Results 1962 (special)
Year	Democrat	Votes	Pct	Republican	Votes	Pct
1962	Gracie Pfost	126,398	49.1%	Len B. Jordan	131,279	50.9%

== Death ==
After leaving the House in 1963, Pfost remained in Washington and worked in the Federal Housing Administration as a special assistant on housing for the elderly. She was hospitalized in Washington with pneumonia in October and a few months later at Johns Hopkins Hospital in Baltimore, Maryland. Later diagnosed with Hodgkin's disease, Pfost was admitted to Johns Hopkins Hospital several times in 1965, and died there on August 11 at age 59.

Pfost's husband Jack died of a heart attack four years earlier, at her Washington office during her last term in Congress. They did not have children and are buried at Meridian Cemetery in Meridian, Idaho.

== See also ==
- Women in the United States House of Representatives

U.S. House of Representatives
Preceded by John Wood	Member of the U.S. House of Representatives from Idaho's 1st congressional district 1953–1963	Succeeded by Compton White Jr.
Party political offices
Preceded by Bob McLaughlin	Democratic nominee for U.S. Senator from Idaho (Class 2); 1962	Succeeded by Ralph Harding
