= List of United States senators in the 88th Congress =

This is a complete list of United States senators during the 88th United States Congress listed by seniority from January 3, 1963, to January 3, 1965.

Order of service is based on the commencement of the senator's first term. Behind this is former service as a senator (only giving the senator seniority within their new incoming class), service as vice president, a House member, a cabinet secretary, or a governor of a state. The final factor is the population of the senator's state.

In this congress, J. William Fulbright (D-Arkansas) was the most senior junior senator and Hiram Fong (R-Hawaii) was the most junior senior senator.

Senators who were sworn in during the middle of the two-year congressional term (up until the last senator who was not sworn in early after winning the November 1964 election) are listed at the end of the list with no number.

== Terms of service ==
Class	Terms of service of senators that expired in years
Class 1	Terms of service of senators that expired in 1965 (AZ, CA, CT, DE, FL, HI, IN, MA, MD, ME, MI, MN, MO, MS, MT, ND, NE, NJ, NM, NV, NY, OH, PA, RI, TN, TX, UT, VA, VT, WA, WI, WV, and WY.)
Class 2	Terms of service of senators that expired in 1967 (AK, AL, AR, CO, DE, GA, IA, ID, IL, KS, KY, LA, MA, ME, MI, MN, MS, MT, NC, NE, NH, NJ, NM, OK, OR, RI, SC, SD, TN, TX, VA, WV, and WY.)
Class 3	Terms of service of senators that expired in 1969 (AL, AK, AR, AZ, CA, CO, CT, FL, GA, HI, IA, ID, IL, IN, KS, KY, LA, MD, MO, NC, NH, NV, NY, ND, OH, OK, OR, PA, SC, SD, UT, VT, WA, and WI.)

== U.S. Senate seniority list ==
U.S. Senate seniority
Rank	Senator (party-state)	Seniority date	Other factors
1	Carl Hayden (D-AZ)	March 4, 1927	
2	Richard Russell, Jr. (D-GA)	January 12, 1933	
3	Harry F. Byrd, Sr. (D-VA)	March 4, 1933	
4	Allen J. Ellender (D-LA)	January 3, 1937	
5	Joseph L. Hill (D-AL)	January 11, 1938	
6	George Aiken (R-VT)	January 10, 1941	
7	James Eastland (D-MS)	January 3, 1943	Previously a senator
8	John Little McClellan (D-AR)	January 3, 1943	
9	Warren G. Magnuson (D-WA)	December 14, 1944	
10	J. William Fulbright (D-AR)	January 3, 1945	Former representative
11	Bourke B. Hickenlooper (R-IA)	January 3, 1945	Former governor, Iowa 20th in population (1940)
12	Olin D. Johnston (D-SC)	January 3, 1945	Former governor, South Carolina 26th in population (1940)
13	Wayne Morse (D-OR)	January 3, 1945	
14	Leverett Saltonstall (R-MA)	January 4, 1945	
15	Milton Young (R-ND)	March 12, 1945	
16	Spessard Holland (D-FL)	September 24, 1946	
17	A. Willis Robertson (D-VA)	November 6, 1946	Former representative (13 years, 10 months)
18	John Sparkman (D-AL)	November 6, 1946	Former representative (9 years, 10 months)
19	John J. Williams (R-DE)	January 3, 1947	
20	John C. Stennis (D-MS)	November 17, 1947	
21	Karl Mundt (R-SD)	December 31, 1948	Former representative
22	Russell B. Long (D-LA)	December 31, 1948	
23	Estes Kefauver (D-TN)	January 3, 1949	Former representative (10 years)
24	Margaret Chase Smith (R-ME)	January 3, 1949	Former representative (8 years, 7 months)
25	Clinton Anderson (D-NM)	January 3, 1949	Former representative (4 years, 5 months)
26	Paul Douglas (D-IL)	January 3, 1949	Illinois 3rd in population (1940)
27	Hubert Humphrey (D-MN)	January 3, 1949	Minnesota 18th in population (1940)
28	Frank Carlson (R-KS)	November 27, 1950	
29	John O. Pastore (D-RI)	December 19, 1950	
30	Everett Dirksen (R-IL)	January 3, 1951	Former representative (16 years)
31	Almer Monroney (D-OK)	January 3, 1951	Former representative (12 years)
32	George Smathers (D-FL)	January 3, 1951	Former representative (4 years)
33	Wallace F. Bennett (R-UT)	January 3, 1951	
34	Thomas Kuchel (R-CA)	January 2, 1953	
35	Albert Gore, Sr. (D-TN)	January 3, 1953	Former representative (14 years)
36	Henry M. Jackson (D-WA)	January 3, 1953	Former representative (12 years)
37	James Glenn Beall (R-MD)	January 3, 1953	Former representative (10 years), Maryland 28th in population (1950)
38	Mike Mansfield (D-MT)	January 3, 1953	Former representative (10 years), Montana 42nd in population (1950)
39	Stuart Symington (D-MO)	January 3, 1953	Missouri 12th in population (1950)
40	Barry Goldwater (R-AZ)	January 3, 1953	Arizona 37th in population (1950)
41	Sam Ervin (D-NC)	June 5, 1954	
42	Norris Cotton (R-NH)	November 8, 1954	Former representative (7 years, 10 months)
43	Roman Hruska (R-NE)	November 8, 1954	Former representative (1 year, 10 months)
44	Alan Bible (D-NV)	December 2, 1954	
45	Carl Curtis (R-NE)	January 1, 1955	
46	Clifford P. Case (R-NJ)	January 3, 1955	Former representative
47	Patrick V. McNamara (D-MI)	January 3, 1955	Maryland 24th in population (1950)
48	Gordon L. Allott (R-CO)	January 3, 1955	Colorado 32nd in population (1950)
49	John Sherman Cooper (R-KY)	November 7, 1956	Previously a senator (twice) (total tenure 4 years, 4 months)
50	Strom Thurmond (D-SC)	November 7, 1956	Previously a senator (1 year, 3 months)
51	Thruston Ballard Morton (R-KY)	January 3, 1957	Former representative
52	Frank J. Lausche (D-OH)	January 3, 1957	Former governor, Ohio 5th in population (1950)
53	Herman Talmadge (D-GA)	January 3, 1957	Former governor, Georgia 13th in population (1950)
54	Joseph S. Clark (D-PA)	January 3, 1957	Pennsylvania 3rd in population (1950)
55	Frank Church (D-ID)	January 3, 1957	Idaho 43rd in population (1950)
56	Jacob K. Javits (R-NY)	January 9, 1957	
57	Ralph Yarborough (D-TX)	April 29, 1957	
58	William Proxmire (D-WI)	August 28, 1957	
59	Ben Jordan (D-NC)	April 19, 1958	
60	Jennings Randolph (D-WV)	November 5, 1958	
61	Hugh Scott (R-PA)	January 3, 1959	Former representative (18 years)
62	Clair Engle (D-CA)	January 3, 1959	Former representative (15 years, 4 months)
63	Kenneth Keating (R-NY)	January 3, 1959	Former representative (12 years)
64	Eugene McCarthy (D-MN)	January 3, 1959	Former representative (10 years)
65	Stephen Young (D-OH)	January 3, 1959	Former representative (8 years), Ohio 5th in population (1950)
66	Winston L. Prouty (R-VT)	January 3, 1959	Former representative (8 years), Vermont 46th in population (1950)
67	Robert Byrd (D-WV)	January 3, 1959	Former representative (6 years)
68	Harrison A. Williams (D-NJ)	January 3, 1959	Former representative (4 years), New Jersey 8th in population (1950)
69	Thomas J. Dodd (D-CT)	January 3, 1959	Former representative (4 years), Connecticut 34th in population (1950)
70	Edward L. Bartlett (D-AK)	January 3, 1959	Former delegate
71	Edmund Muskie (D-ME)	January 3, 1959	Former governor, Maine 35th in population (1950)
72	Ernest Gruening (D-AK)	January 3, 1959	Former Territorial Governor, Alaska 50th in population (1950)
73	Philip Hart (D-MI)	January 3, 1959	Michigan 7th in population (1950)
74	Vance Hartke (D-IN)	January 3, 1959	Indiana 11th in population (1950)
75	Frank Moss (D-UT)	January 3, 1959	Utah 38th in population (1950)
76	Gale W. McGee (D-WY)	January 3, 1959	Wyoming 48th in population (1950)
77	Howard Cannon (D-NV)	January 3, 1959	Nevada 49th in population (1950)
78	Hiram Fong (R-HI)	August 21, 1959	
79	Quentin Northrup Burdick (D-ND)	August 8, 1960	
80	Edward V. Long (D-MO)	September 23, 1960	
81	Maurine Neuberger (D-OR)	November 9, 1960	
82	Lee Metcalf (D-MT)	January 3, 1961	Former representative (8 years)
83	James Boggs (R-DE)	January 3, 1961	Former representative (6 years)
84	Jack Miller (R-IA)	January 3, 1961	Iowa 22nd in population (1950)
85	Claiborne Pell (D-RI)	January 3, 1961	Rhode Island 36th in population (1950)
86	John Tower (R-TX)	June 15, 1961	
87	James B. Pearson (R-KS)	January 31, 1962	
88	Len Jordan (R-ID)	August 6, 1962	
89	Milward L. Simpson (R-WY)	November 7, 1962	Former governor
90	Ted Kennedy (D-MA)	November 7, 1962	Massachusetts 9th in population (1960)
91	Thomas J. McIntyre (D-NH)	November 7, 1962	New Hampshire 45th in population (1960)
92	Edwin L. Mechem (R-NM)	November 30, 1962	
93	Abraham A. Ribicoff (D-CT)	January 3, 1963	Former representative (4 years), former cabinet secretary
94	Daniel Brewster (D-MD)	January 3, 1963	Former representative (4 years) - Maryland 21st in population (1960)
95	George McGovern (D-SD)	January 3, 1963	Former representative (4 years) - South Dakota 40th in population (1960)
96	Daniel Inouye (D-HI)	January 3, 1963	Former representative (4 years) - Hawaii 43rd in population (1960)
97	Peter H. Dominick (R-CO)	January 3, 1963	Former representative (2 years)
98	Birch Bayh (D-IN)	January 3, 1963	
99	J. Howard Edmondson (D-OK)	January 7, 1963	
100	Gaylord Nelson (D-WI)	January 8, 1963	
	Herbert S. Walters (D-TN)	August 20, 1963	
	Pierre Salinger (D-CA)	August 4, 1964	
	Ross Bass (D-TN)	November 4, 1964	Former representative (9 years, 10 months)
	Joseph Montoya (D-NM)	November 4, 1964	Former representative (7 years)
	Fred R. Harris (D-OK)	November 4, 1964	
	Walter Mondale (D-MN)	December 30, 1964	
	George Murphy (R-CA)	January 1, 1965	

The most senior senators by class were Harry F. Byrd Sr. (D-Virginia) from Class 1, Richard Russell Jr. (D-Georgia) from Class 2, and Carl Hayden (D-Arizona) from Class 3.

== See also ==
- 88th United States Congress
- List of United States representatives in the 88th Congress
