= State of Idaho Executive Residence =

Former official residence of the governor of Idaho

Coordinates: 43.6523°N 116.1979°W

Location in the United States
Location in Idaho

The State of Idaho has been without an official governor's residence since 2013.

Pierce House, in Boise's North End at 1805 N. 21st Street, served that role from 1947 to 1989. From 2009 until 2013, the former home of billionaire agribusiness magnate J. R. Simplot (1909–2008) and his wife Esther Simplot, served as the governor's official residence, although the house remained unoccupied; during this period, it was officially known as Idaho House.

Citing upkeep costs, the state returned the house to the Simplot family in 2013; it was demolished in January 2016, although its substantial flagpole remains.

== Background ==
In 1995, the Idaho Legislature formed a Governor's Housing Committee and Residence Fund "for the purpose of providing a Governor's housing allowance and/or the acquisition, construction, remodel, furnishing, equipping, or maintaining a Governor's residence." In 1999, the Legislature amended Idaho law to allow the Governor's Housing Committee "to accept grants, gifts, or donations related to a governor's residence."

== The Simplot mansion ==
J. R. Simplot, once among the 100 richest Americans, bought 2,200 acres (3.4 sq mi; 8.9 km^{2}) of undeveloped land in the Boise foothills in 1947 for five dollars an acre. Thirty-two years later in 1979, he built a Mediterranean-style villa on the land, located at 4000 Simplot Lane, on the top of a prominent hill in what had become the Highlands neighborhood of North Boise. The hill's elevation is about 3,150 feet (960 m) above sea level, north of and over two hundred vertical feet (60 m) above adjacent Bogus Basin Road.

The main level of the home consisted of two bedrooms, two and a half bathrooms, a library, a main kitchen and caterer's kitchen, and a board room/dining room, while the upper level consisted of an office, bathroom, entertainment area and great room/formal dining room. The 38-acre (15 ha) property included a 7,370-square-foot (685 m^{2}) house and a 1,151-square-foot (107 m^{2}) garage.

The house was visible for miles, and was dubbed "Fort Simplot" by neighbors who said it resembled a Boy Scout camp. A flagpole flying a thirty-by-fifty-foot (9 by 15 m) American flag was erected in 1980. Neighbors soon complained that the noise from the flag disturbed their sleep at night; Simplot responded by raising the flagpole to one hundred feet (30 m). A mudslide from the slopes of the hill in 1983 caused $20,000 in damage to an adjacent home.

Simplot gave the property to the state government on December 21, 2004, to serve as a residence for future governors after his own death, on the sole condition that a massive American flag continue to fly above the home. Dirk Kempthorne, governor at the time of the donation, accepted Simplot's donation of the $2.1 million property in 2004 and launched a $3 million private fund raising effort to renovate the interior. He also planned to sell naming rights to various rooms to make the house a showcase for Idaho industry, but Kempthorne resigned in June 2006 to become Secretary of the Interior and the plans were never implemented under his short-term successor, Jim Risch. The state's next governor, Butch Otter, was a former executive with the Simplot Company. He had divorced Simplot's daughter Gay in 1993, and declined to live in the mansion that his former father-in-law had built. In the 2006 gubernatorial election, Otter's Democratic opponent Jerry Brady called the house "too gaudy for a governor."

Simplot died at age 99 in 2008; the following year, some state legislators suggested selling the thirty-year-old home, using the proceeds to build a new mansion on state-owned residential property nearby. In January 2009, it was reported that a fund-raising campaign for the mansion had "sputtered" and that the cost of maintaining the lawn, $100,000 a year, was depleting funds. Otter and his wife Lori lived on their ranch west of the city near Star and received a state housing allowance of $58,000 per year, causing controversy. The Idaho Statesman editorialized that "It is ridiculous to subsidize his living expenses." Otter said he would stop taking the allowance once the state finished minimal renovations to the mansion, but would still not live there.

In 2013, the state government returned ownership of the property to the Simplot family due to the cost of its maintenance. Again citing maintenance costs, the family announced on January 4, 2016, that the house would be demolished. Demolition of the mansion began the same day, and was completed within a week. The Simplot family has not disclosed any plans for the site.
