= Grace Jordan =

First Lady of Idaho from 1951 to 1955

First Lady of Idaho
- In role January 1, 1951 – January 3, 1955
- Governor: Len Jordan
- Preceded by: Olive Robins
- Succeeded by: Lucille Smylie

Personal details
- Born: Grace Hartley Edgington; April 16, 1892 Wasco, Oregon, U.S.
- Died: September 20, 1985 (aged 93) Boise, Idaho U.S.
- Resting place: Cloverdale Memorial Park
- Spouse: Len Jordan (m. 1924; died 1985)
- Education: University of Oregon

Grace Edgington Jordan (April 16, 1892 – September 20, 1985) was an American author and journalist who served as first lady of Idaho from 1951 to 1955 as wife of Governor Len Jordan. As an author, she primarily wrote about her adopted home state of Idaho.

== Biography ==
Born Grace Hartley Edgington in Wasco, Oregon in 1892 to a doctor and a schoolteacher, she graduated with an honors degree in English from the University of Oregon. Following graduation, she worked as a journalist in Eugene and Lewiston, Idaho. In 1923, she became a member of Pi Beta Phi fraternity for Women when she was initiated as a convention Honor Initiate.

On December 30, 1924, she married Len Jordan (1899–1983). In 1933, the Jordans and their three children moved to a ranch in Hells Canyon along the Snake River in Idaho and later to Grangeville. In 1946, Len was elected to the state senate and in 1950, he was elected governor. The family moved to Boise where she served as First Lady of Idaho for four years.

Jordan's first book, Home Below Hells Canyon was published in 1954. A memoir of her time along the Snake River, it has since been translated into several languages and remains her best-known work. Several other books about Idaho life followed and Jordan wrote poetry and taught creative writing at several Idaho universities. In August 1962, Len was appointed to the U. S. Senate seat vacated by the death of Henry Dworshak. Three months later, Len was elected to complete the remaining four years of the term and the Jordans relocated to Washington D.C. He was re-elected in 1966, but chose not to run in 1972 and they retired from public service. Grace Jordan's book The Unintentional Senator describes this time in their life.

== Death and legacy ==
The Jordans returned to Boise, where she died in 1985, two years after her husband. They are buried in the Cloverdale Cemetery in west Boise.

Grace Jordan School in the Boise School District is named in her honor.

== Selected works ==
Home Below Hells Canyon (1954) (ISBN 0803251076)
Canyon Boy (1960)
Idaho Reader (1963)
The King's Pines of Idaho (1961)
The Unintentional Senator (1972)
The Country Editor (1976)
