= Teresa Little =

American educator and first lady of Idaho

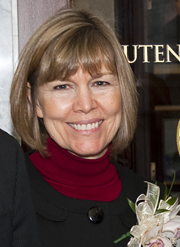

First Lady of Idaho
- Current
- Assumed role January 7, 2019
- Governor: Brad Little
- Preceded by: Lori Otter

Second Lady of Idaho
- In role January 6, 2009 – January 7, 2019
- Lieutenant Governor: Brad Little
- Preceded by: Vicki Risch
- Succeeded by: Jim McGeachin (as second gentleman)

Personal details
- Born: Teresa Soulen Weiser, Idaho, U.S.
- Spouse: Brad Little (m. 1978)
- Children: 2
- Education: University of Idaho (BA)

Teresa Little (née Soulen) is an American educator who has served as the first lady of Idaho since 2019 as the wife of Governor Brad Little. During her husband's term as lieutenant governor of Idaho, Little served as the second lady from 2009 to 2019.

== Early life and education ==
Little was born Teresa Soulen in Weiser, Idaho and raised on a ranch. She earned a Bachelor of Arts degree in home economics education with minors in science and physical education from the University of Idaho.

== Career ==
After graduating from college, Little taught high school in Oregon. After marrying Brad Little in 1978, she became a homemaker. During her husband's career in politics, Little has served on many non-profit boards, including Idaho Public Television. She has also acted as an informal political advisor to her husband.

== First Lady of Idaho (2019–present) ==
Little became first lady of Idaho in January 2019 when her husband, Brad Little, was sworn in as governor.
