= 1966 United States Senate election in Idaho =

- November 8, 1966
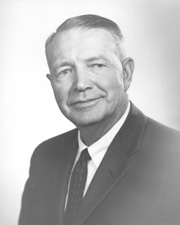

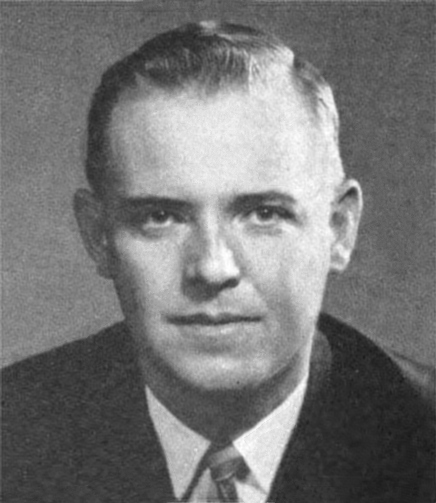
Nominee	Len Jordan	Ralph Harding
Party	Republican	Democratic
Popular vote	139,819	112,637
Percentage	55.38%	44.62%
- County results Jordan: 50–60% 60–70% Harding: 50–60% 60–70% 70–80%
U.S. senator before election
Len Jordan
Republican
Elected U.S. Senator
Len Jordan
Republican

The 1966 United States Senate election in Idaho took place on November 8, 1966. Incumbent Republican Senator Len Jordan was re-elected to a second term in office over Democratic U.S. Representative Ralph Harding.

== General election ==
=== Results ===
General election results
Party	Candidate	Votes	%	±%
Republican	Len Jordan (incumbent)	139,819	55.38%	▲4.43
Democratic	Ralph Harding	112,637	44.62%	▼4.43
Total votes		252,456	100.00%	

== See also ==
- 1966 United States Senate elections
