= List of mayors of Coeur d'Alene, Idaho =

The following is a list of mayors of the city of Coeur d'Alene, Idaho, United States.

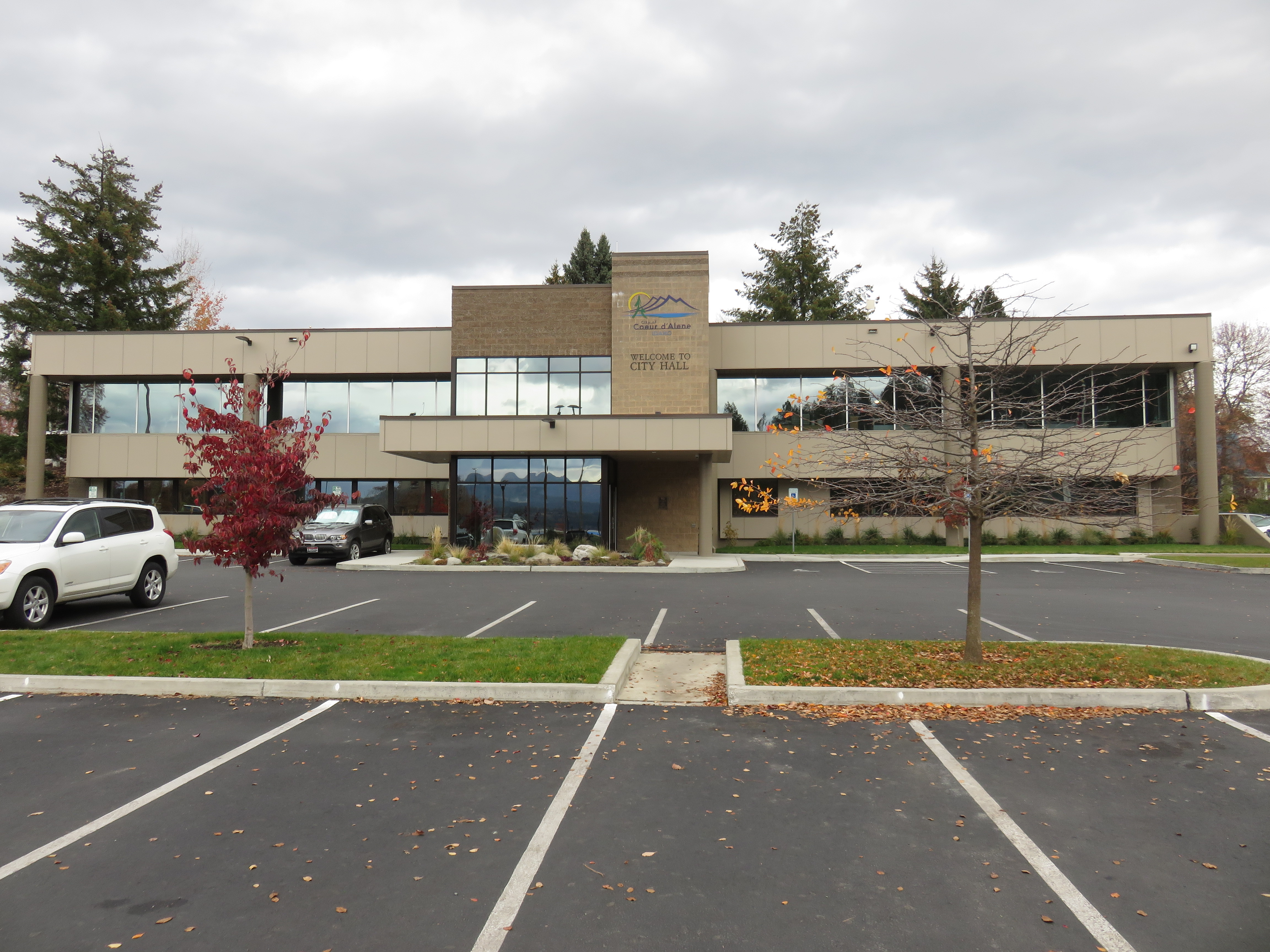
City hall building in Coeur d'Alene, Idaho (photo 2018)

== Chairmen ==
- J.C. Thomas, c.1903
- Charles D. Warner, c.1904

== Mayors ==
- Hugh V. Scallon, 1907-1909
- Boyd Hamilton, 1909-1911
- John Travers Wood, 1911-1913
- R. S. Nelson, 1913
- Charles Feil, 1913-1915
- S. H. McEuen, 1915-1917
- C. H. Potts, 1917-1919
- H. P. Glindeman, 1919-1921
- J. C. Dwyer, 1921-1923
- Oscar W. Edmonds, 1923-1927, 1943-1945
- George Natwick, 1927-1931
- Jess Ray Simpson, 1931-1932
- Ralph Gaines, 1932-1933
- John KnoxCoe, 1933-1937, 1939-1941
- A. Grantham, 1937-1939
- P. N. Panabaker, 1941-1943
- A. M. Rosenlund, 1945-1947
- J. G. Adams, 1947-1950
- L. L. Gardner, 1950-1955, 1965-1969
- P. A. Christianson, 1955-1961
- James McKinnon, 1961-1963
- Marc Souther, 1963-1965
- John McHugh, 1969-1973
- Loren R. Edinger, 1973-1977
- Donald Johnston, 1977-1981
- James Fromm, 1981-1985
- Ray Stone, 1986-1993
- A. J. "Al" Hassell, 1993-1997
- Steven Judy, 1997-2001
- Sandi Bloem, 2001-2014
- Steve Widmyer, 2014-2022
- Jim Hammond, 2022-2024
- Woody McEvers, 2024-2026
- Dan Gookin, 2026-present

== See also ==
- Coeur d'Alene history
