= 1962 United States Senate special election in Idaho =

- November 6, 1962
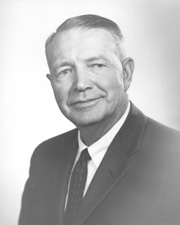

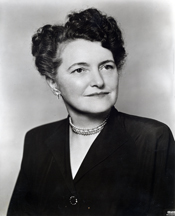
Nominee	Len Jordan	Gracie Pfost
Party	Republican	Democratic
Popular vote	131,279	126,398
Percentage	50.95%	49.05%
- County results Jordan: 50–60% 60–70% Pfost: 50–60% 60–70% 70–80% 80–90%
U.S. senator before election
Len Jordan
Republican
Elected U.S. Senator
Len Jordan
Republican

The 1962 United States Senate special election in Idaho took place on November 6, 1962, to elect a U.S. Senator to complete the unexpired term of Senator Henry Dworshak, who died on July 23, 1962.

Following his nomination for the special election by the Republican state committee, former Governor of Idaho Len Jordan was appointed on August 6, 1962, by Governor Robert E. Smylie to fill the vacancy until a special election could be held.

Jordan won the special election, narrowly defeating Democratic nominee Gracie Pfost.

== Nominations ==
As the vacancy occurred after the primary elections for the ordinary 1962 elections were held, the candidates were selected by the state central committees.

=== Democratic nomination ===
==== Candidate ====
- Gracie Pfost, incumbent Congresswoman for Idaho's 1st congressional district

==== Results ====
The Democratic state committee met at Boise on August 18. They nominated Gracie Pfost unanimously by voice vote.

=== Republican primary ===
==== Candidates ====
- Hamer Budge, former U.S. Representative
- Len Jordan, former Governor
- A. W. Naegle, president pro tempore of the Idaho Senate
- George V. Hansen, Pocatello city commissioner
- John C. Sanborn, former U.S. Representative
- Dick Smith, Rexburg
- Sid Smith, Kootenai County
- Dr. Raymond L. White, Boise

==== Results ====
The Republican state committee met at Pocatello on August 4. They nominated Len Jordan unanimously on the second ballot.

The unofficial results of the first ballot were as follows:

Republican nomination, 1st ballot
Party	Candidate	Votes	%
Republican	Len Jordan (Incumbent)	61	46.2
Republican	Hamer Budge	31	23.5
Republican	A. W. Naegle	13	9.8
Republican	George V. Hansen	12	9.1
Republican	Raymond L. White	7	5.3
Republican	Dick Smith	4	3.0
Republican	Sid Smith	4	3.0
Republican	John C. Sanborn	0	0.0
Total votes		132	100.00

== General election ==
=== Results ===
1962 United States Senate election in Idaho
Party	Candidate	Votes	%
Republican	Len Jordan (Incumbent)	131,279	50.95
Democratic	Gracie Pfost	126,398	49.05
Majority		4,881	1.90
Turnout		257,677	
Republican hold			

== See also ==
- 1962 United States Senate elections

== Bibliography ==
- Congressional Elections, 1946-1996. Washington, D.C.: Congressional Quarterly Inc. 1998. ISBN 1-56802-248-4.
- Scammon, Richard M., ed. (1964). America Votes 5: a handbook of contemporary American election statistics, 1962. Washington, D.C.: Governmental Affairs Institute.
