= Vicki Risch =

American politician

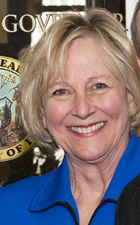
- Risch in 2011

First Lady of Idaho
- In role May 26, 2006 – January 1, 2007
- Governor: Jim Risch
- Preceded by: Patricia Kempthorne
- Succeeded by: Lori Otter

Second Lady of Idaho
- In role January 1, 2007 – January 3, 2009
- Lieutenant Governor: Jim Risch
- Preceded by: Cheryl Ricks
- Succeeded by: Teresa Little
- In role January 3, 2003 – May 26, 2006
- Lieutenant Governor: Jim Risch
- Preceded by: Patricia Kempthorne
- Succeeded by: Cheryl Ricks

Personal details
- Party: Republican
- Spouse: Jim Risch (m. 1968)
- Children: 3

Vicki Risch is an American woman who served as the first lady of Idaho from 2006 to 2007 Governor Jim Risch. During her husband's term as lieutenant governor of Idaho, Risch served as the second lady from 2003 to 2006 and again from 2007 to 2009.

== First and Second Lady of Idaho (2003–2009) ==
Risch became first lady on May 26, 2006, when her husband succeeded former governor, Dirk Kempthorne, who resigned to become United States Secretary of the Interior. She succeeded former first lady, Patricia Kempthorne, who had held the post for over seven years. She served as first lady until January 2007, as her husband did not seek a full term as governor, but rather was reelected to his old post as lieutenant governor.

Preceded by Patricia Kempthorne	First Lady of Idaho; May 26, 2006 – January 1, 2007	Succeeded by Lori Otter
Preceded by Patricia Kempthorne	Second Lady of Idaho; January 3, 2003 – May 26, 2006	Succeeded by Cheryl Ricks
Preceded by Cheryl Ricks	Second Lady of Idaho; January 1, 2007 – January 3, 2009	Succeeded by Teresa Little
