= Patricia Kempthorne =

American politician

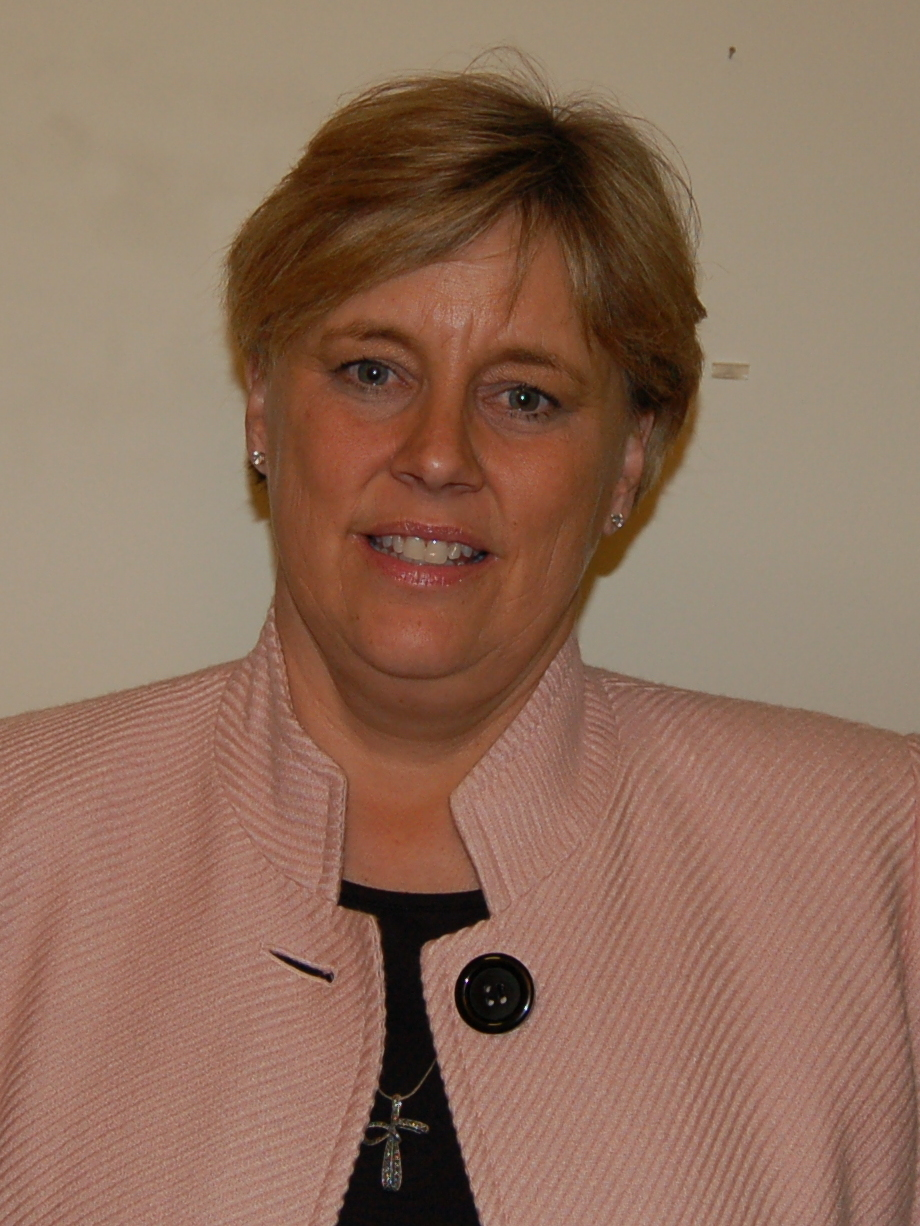

First Lady of Idaho
- In role January 8, 1999 – May 26, 2006
- Governor: Dirk Kempthorne
- Preceded by: Jacque Batt
- Succeeded by: Vicki Risch

Personal details
- Born: November 1, 1953 (age 72)
- Party: Republican
- Spouse: Dirk Kempthorne (m. 1977; died 2026)
- Children: 2

Patricia Kempthorne (born November 1, 1953) is an American woman who served as the first lady of Idaho from 1999 to 2006 as the wife of Governor Dirk Kempthorne. As first lady she was active in issues affecting children and families in Idaho and took the lead in assisting state government with children's policy. She is a former First Lady of Boise, Idaho (1986–1993).

In March 2006, President George W. Bush nominated Governor Kempthorne to be the United States Secretary of the Interior. After his confirmation by the U.S. Senate on May 26, 2006, she ceased to be the state's first lady. She was scheduled to give up the role in January 2007, as her husband was not seeking reelection to a third term. She was replaced by Vicki Risch, the wife of Governor Jim Risch, who succeeded Kempthorne. Her husband died on April 24, 2026.
