= Woodridge, North Dakota =

Town in North Dakota

Woodridge was a village in North Dakota, located somewhere near Hampden.

John Travers Wood immigrated here as a boy in 1901.
