= 1950 Idaho gubernatorial election =

- November 7, 1950
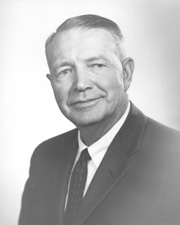

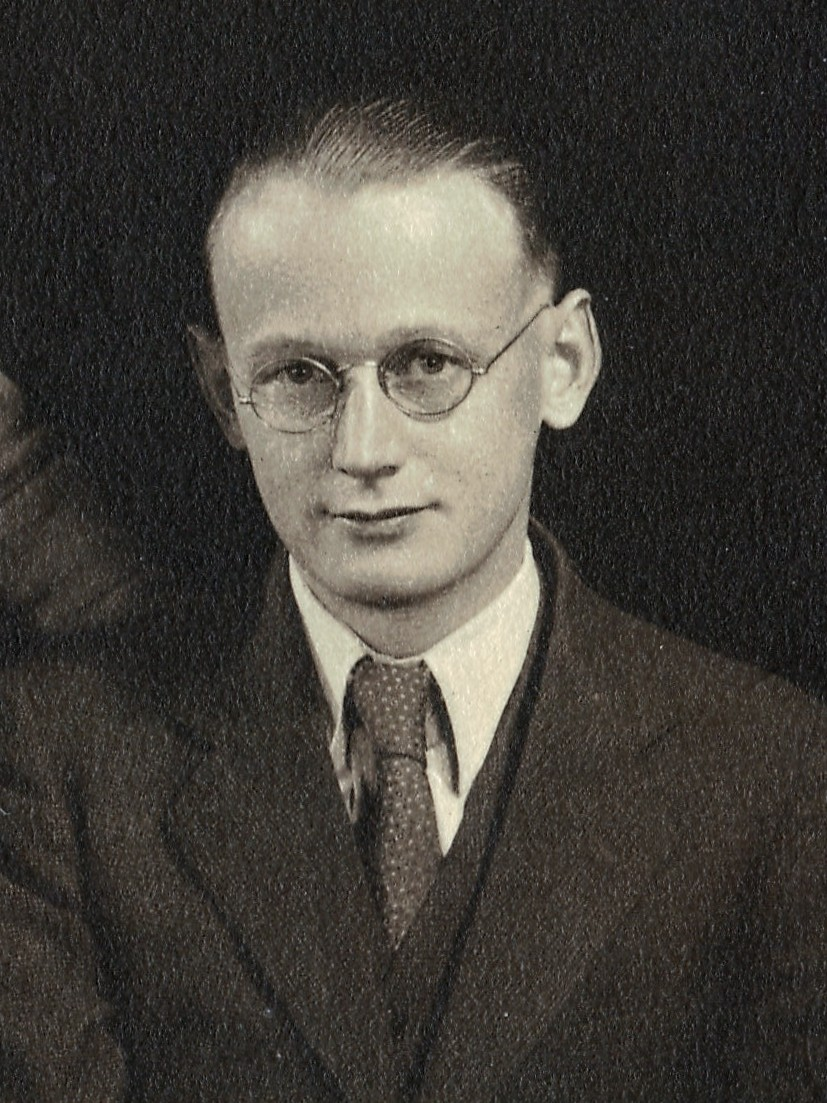
Nominee	Len Jordan	Calvin E. Wright
Party	Republican	Democratic
Popular vote	107,642	97,150
Percentage	52.56%	47.44%
- County results Jordan: 50–60% 60–70% Wright: 50–60% 60–70%
Governor before election
C. A. Robins
Republican
Elected Governor
Len Jordan
Republican

The 1950 Idaho gubernatorial election was held on November 7 to elect the next governor of Idaho, alongside elections to the United States Senate, elections to the U.S. House, and other state and local elections.

Idaho changed the term for governor from two to four years starting with the 1946 election, and the incumbent was not allowed to run for a second term (self-succession) until 1958. Republican nominee Len Jordan defeated Democratic nominee Calvin E. Wright with 52.56% of the vote.

Governor C. A. Robins ran for the U.S. Senate, but lost in the August primary to Herman Welker.

== Primary elections ==
Primary elections were held on August 8, 1950.

=== Democratic primary ===
==== Candidates ====
- Calvin Wright, Rupert, former state auditor
- Arnold Williams, St. Anthony, former governor
- George Hersley, Boise, state grange master

=== Republican primary ===
==== Candidates ====
- Len Jordan, Grangeville businessman and farmer, former state senator
- Reilly Atkinson, Boise businessman, former state party chairman
- J.D. Price, Malad, former secretary of state
- George Vaughn, Payette, former state safety director
- Seth Harper, Shoshone, former manager of state liquor dispensary

== General election ==
=== Candidates ===
- Len Jordan, Republican
- Calvin E. Wright, Democratic

=== Results ===
1950 Idaho gubernatorial election
Party	Candidate	Votes	%	±%
Republican	Len Jordan	107,642	52.56%	
Democratic	Calvin E. Wright	97,150	47.44%	
Majority		10,492		
Turnout		204,792		
Republican hold		Swing		
