= Ray Stone =

American politician

Mayor of Coeur d'Alene, Idaho
- In office January 1986 – January 1994
- Preceded by: James Fromm
- Succeeded by: Al Hassell

Personal details
- Born: September 2, 1923 Craigmont, Idaho
- Died: June 17, 2013 (aged 89)
- Spouse: Betty Stone (1944–2013)
- Education: Whitworth University

Raymond Leon Stone (September 2, 1923 – June 17, 2013) was an American politician, educator and jazz musician. He served as the mayor of Coeur d'Alene, Idaho, for two consecutive terms from January 1986 to January 1994. Stone was awarded the Eisenhower Liberation Medal by the United States Holocaust Memorial Museum in 1988 for his part in the liberation of Wöbbelin concentration camp during World War II, as well as the campaign by the city of Coeur d'Alene against local Neo-Nazi groups in the northern Idaho Panhandle.

== Biography ==
Stone was born in Craigmont, Idaho, on September 2, 1923, to Myra and Elmer Stone. He became a drummer during high school.

Stone graduated from high school in 1941 and enrolled in college in Lewiston State Normal School (present-day Lewis–Clark State College). However, he decided to leave college and enlist in the United States Army following the Attack on Pearl Harbor.

== See also ==
- List of mayors of Coeur d'Alene, Idaho
