= John Travers Wood =

American politician (1878–1954)

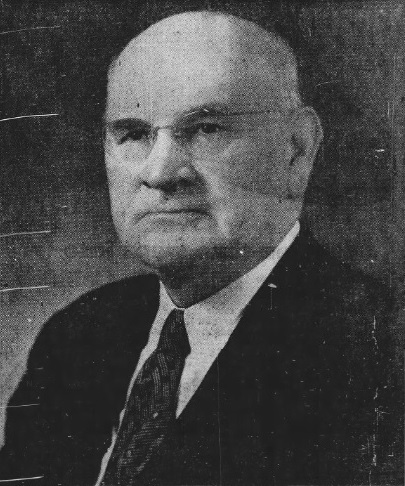
- The Idaho Statesman, November 3, 1952

Member of the U.S. House of Representatives from Idaho's 1st district
- In office January 3, 1951 – January 3, 1953
- Preceded by: Compton I. White
- Succeeded by: Gracie Pfost

Personal details
- Born: November 25, 1878 Wakefield, England
- Died: November 2, 1954 (aged 75) Coeur d'Alene, Idaho, U.S.
- Resting place: Forest Cemetery; Coeur d'Alene, Idaho, U.S.
- Party: Republican
- Other political affiliations: Socialist Party of America
- Spouse(s): Margaret O. Thomson (1889–1978) (m. 1907–1954, his death)
- Children: 5
- Education: Detroit College of Medicine (MD)

Military service
- Allegiance: United States
- Branch/service: United States Army
- Rank: First Lieutenant
- Unit: Medical Corps
- Battles/wars: World War I

John Travers Wood (November 25, 1878 – November 2, 1954) was an American physician and politician who served as a one-term U.S. representative from northern Idaho from 1951 to 1953.

== Early life and education ==
Born in Wakefield, West Yorkshire, Wood immigrated with his parents to the United States in 1889. They settled in Woodridge, North Dakota, and he became a naturalized a citizen in 1901. After graduating public schools there, he taught school for six years. He then graduated from Detroit College of Medicine.

== Career ==
After graduating from medical school, Wood moved to Hannah, North Dakota, where he operated a medical practice before relocating west to Coeur d'Alene, Idaho.

From 1910 to 1950, Wood worked as a traveling surgeon for the Chicago, Milwaukee & St. Paul Railroad.

He was elected mayor of Coeur d'Alene for a term lasting from 1911 to 1913 as a member of the Socialist Party of America, becoming one of the first Socialist mayors in the United States. Wood also founded the town's hospital.

During World War I, he served as a first lieutenant in the medical corps of the United States Army.

=== Congress ===
In the 1950 election, Wood ran as a Republican for the open seat in Congress from Idaho's first district. He took office at the age 72 and served a single term, narrowly losing his re-election bid in 1952 to Gracie Pfost, the first woman to represent Idaho.

During his term, he mentioned his distrust of the United Nations, citing its charter's similarities to the Soviet Union's constitution, and mentioned as much to the U.S. Flag Committee.

== Personal life ==
Wood left the House in January 1953 and returned to Coeur d'Alene, where he died less than two years later.

== Election results ==
U.S. House elections (Idaho's 1st district): Results 1950–1952
Year	Democrat	Votes	Pct	Republican	Votes	Pct
1950	Gracie Pfost	41,040	49.5%	John T. Wood	41,823	50.5%
1952	Gracie Pfost	54,725	50.3%	John T. Wood (inc.)	54,134	49.7%

== See also ==
- List of mayors of Coeur d'Alene, Idaho

U.S. House of Representatives
Preceded by Compton I. White, Sr.	United States House of Representatives, Idaho First Congressional District; January 3, 1951–January 5, 1953	Succeeded by Gracie Pfost
