= Ralph Harding =

American politician (1929–2006)

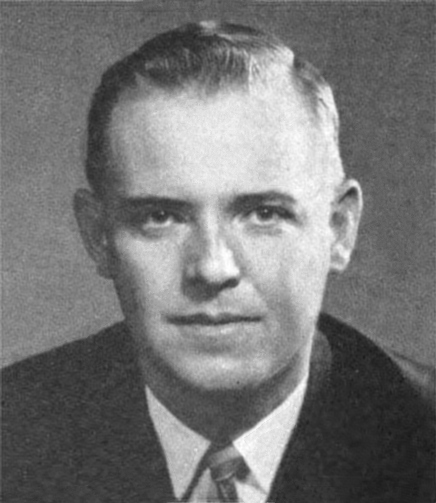
- Harding in 1963

Member of the U.S. House of Representatives from Idaho's 2nd district
- In office January 3, 1961 – January 3, 1965
- Preceded by: Hamer Budge
- Succeeded by: George V. Hansen

Member of the Idaho State Legislature
- In office 1955–1956

Personal details
- Born: September 9, 1929 Malad City, Idaho, US
- Died: October 26, 2006 (aged 77) Blackfoot, Idaho, US
- Resting place: Malad City Cemetery; Malad City, Idaho
- Party: Democratic
- Spouse(s): Wilhelmina Conrad Harding (m.1954–2006, his death)
- Children: 2 sons, 3 daughters
- Profession: Agriculture, Accountant

Military service
- Allegiance: United States
- Branch/service: U.S. Army
- Years of service: 1951–1953
- Rank: Lieutenant
- Battles/wars: Korean War

Ralph R. Harding (September 9, 1929 – October 26, 2006) was a former congressman from eastern Idaho; he served two terms as a Democrat from 1961 to 1965.

== Early life ==
Born in Malad City, Idaho, Harding served as a missionary for the Church of Jesus Christ of Latter-day Saints for two years. He graduated from Brigham Young University in Provo, Utah in 1956, after serving in Korea from 1951 to 1953 in the U.S. Army, where he rose to the rank of lieutenant.

== Career ==
Harding served in the Idaho state legislature from 1955 to 1956. He ran against Republican congressman Hamer Budge, a ten-year incumbent in Idaho's 2nd district in 1960. Harding pulled off an upset victory with 51.1 percent, winning by 4,000 votes. He was re-elected in 1962, but was one of the few incumbent Democrats in the U.S. House who lost to Republican challengers even as President Lyndon B. Johnson won in a landslide in 1964. Many attribute Harding's loss to a speech he made in the U.S. House of Representatives for criticizing LDS Apostle Ezra Taft Benson for being a "spokesman for the radical right of this nation"; Harding's congressional district was home to a large LDS population.

Benson was Secretary of Agriculture for two terms during the Eisenhower administration. After he left the Department of Agriculture, Benson vigorously supported the views of John Birch Society founder Robert Welch. In his book The Patriot, Welch called Eisenhower a communist sympathizer. In a letter, Eisenhower thanked Harding for defending him against Welch's allegations.

After his 1964 defeat, Harding served as special assistant to the Secretary of the Air Force. In 1966, Harding won the Democratic nomination for the U.S. Senate, but was defeated by Republican incumbent Len Jordan in the general election.

U.S. House elections (Idaho's 2nd district): Results 1960–1964
Year	Democrat	Votes	Pct	Republican	Votes	Pct
1960	Ralph Harding	90,161	53.0%	Hamer Budge (inc.)	86,100	47.0%
1962	Ralph Harding (inc.)	83,152	52.8%	Orval Hansen	74,203	47.2%
1964	Ralph Harding (inc.)	84,022	47.8%	George V. Hansen	91,838	51.8%

U.S. Senate elections in Idaho (Class II): Results 1966
Year	Democrat	Votes	Pct	Republican	Votes	Pct
1966	Ralph Harding	112,637	44.6%	Len Jordan (inc.)	139,819	55.4%

Harding attempted to regain the 2nd district seat again in 1978, but lost the Democratic primary to Stan Kress. He then worked on a variety of business ventures, including representing the Philippine sugar industry and attempting to launch an Asian version of the NBA.

== Death and legacy ==
Harding died at the age of seventy-seven in Blackfoot. According to a news report in the Idaho Statesman, a cause of death was not released by the hospital or family at the time of his death. Harding was an active member of the Church of Jesus Christ of Latter-day Saints, and is interred at Malad City Cemetery in Malad City.

In 1977, Harding and baseball hall of famer Harmon Killebrew of Payette co-founded the Danny Thompson Memorial Golf Tournament. The first edition included former President Gerald Ford, Speaker of the House Tip O'Neill, and Hall of Fame slugger Mickey Mantle. Now the Killebrew–Thompson Memorial, the event is held annually in Sun Valley in late August to benefit leukemia and cancer research at St. Luke's Mountain States Tumor Institute in Idaho and Masonic Cancer Center at the University of Minnesota.

U.S. House of Representatives
Preceded by Hamer Budge	United States House of Representatives, Idaho Second Congressional District; January 3, 1961–January 4, 1965	Succeeded by George Hansen
Party political offices
Preceded by Gracie Pfost	Democratic Party nominee, U.S. Senator (Class 2) from Idaho; 1966 (lost)	Succeeded by William E. Davis
