= Jacque Batt =

Former First Lady of Idaho

First Lady of Idaho
- In role January 2, 1995 – January 4, 1999
- Governor: Phil Batt
- Preceded by: Carol May Andrus
- Succeeded by: Patricia Kempthorne

Personal details
- Born: Jacque Elaine Fallis; January 31, 1926 Spokane, Washington, U.S.
- Died: September 7, 2014 (aged 88) Boise, Idaho, U.S.
- Party: Republican
- Spouse: Phil Batt (m. 1948)
- Children: 3
- Education: University of Idaho

Jacque Batt (née Fallis, January 31, 1926 – September 7, 2014) was the First Lady of the U.S. state of Idaho while her husband Phil Batt was Governor of Idaho from January 2, 1995, to January 4, 1999. She was instrumental in founding the Pink Tea in 1998, an organization that raised money for free mammograms for women in need.

== Biography ==
Jacque Elaine Fallis was born to Gordon and Mary Fallis on January 31, 1926. She had two brothers, Bill and Bob Fallis. She met Phil Batt at the University of Idaho, and eloped with him on January 9, 1948, in Potlatch, Idaho.

She was a member of the Delta Delta Delta sorority at the University of Idaho. She was active in Republican party organizations, serving as president of the Canyon County Republican Women's Club in 1971, and was also active in Legisladies, an organization for the wives of Idaho legislators, serving as its president in 1977. She worked with her successor Patricia Kempthorne to found the Pink Tea in 1998, an organization that raised money for free mammograms for women in need. She also worked as a volunteer phoning mothers to remind them about their children's immunizations. She was known for her humble attitude to the role of First Lady, being reported to take the household washing to a laundromat.

Batt was active in the Ninety-Nines, a women's airplane pilot organization, which she joined in 1963. Batt served as the secretary of the Idaho chapter in 1966, and later as Idaho Chapter Chairman. She competed in the Idaho Air Race with the Ninety-Nines, and flew into Mexico and Canada. She also donated to the organization.

She had three children with Phil: William, Rebecca, and Leslie Ann.

Batt died September 7, 2014, and was survived by her husband, whom she had been married to for 66 years. When Batt died, Idaho Governor Butch Otter released the following statement: "We are deeply saddened by the passing of Jacque Batt. We will never forget the enduring strength of her 66-year marriage to Governor Phil Batt and her grace as Idaho's First Lady. She was a deeply caring and compassionate woman who left us all better for having known her. Our thoughts and prayers are with Governor Batt, his family and all those who knew and loved Jacque."

Preceded by Carol May Andrus	First Lady of Idaho; January 2, 1995-Jan. 4, 1999	Succeeded by Patricia Kempthorne
