= Lori Otter =

First Lady of Idaho from 2007 to 2019

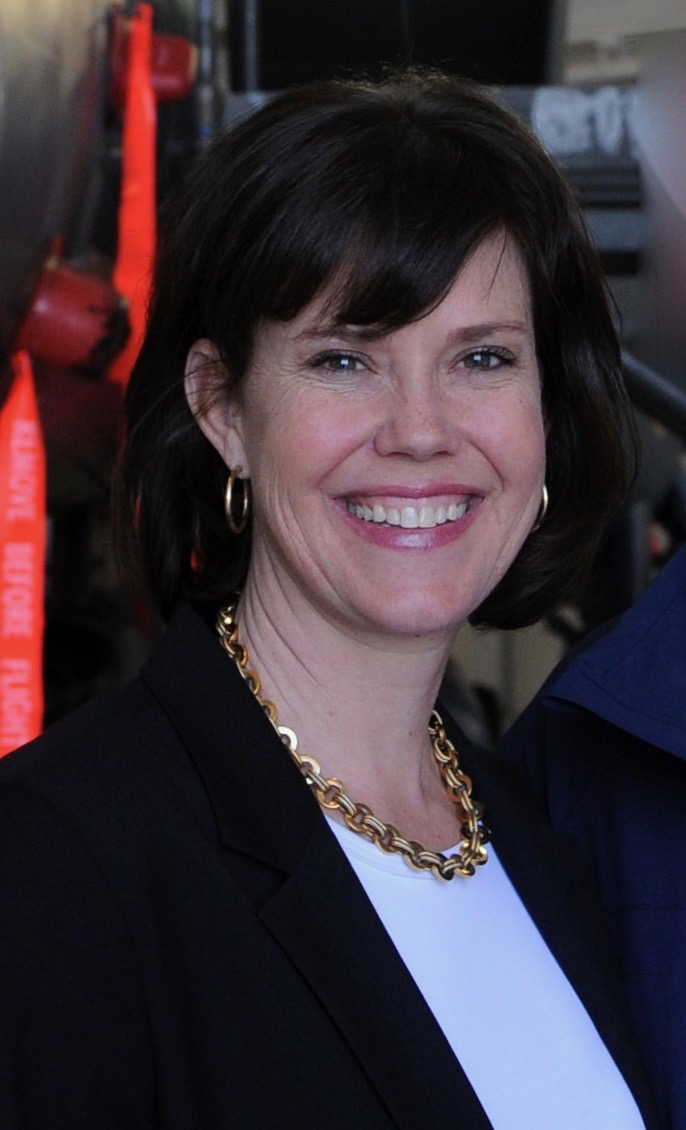
- Picture of Otter

First Lady of Idaho
- In role January 1, 2007 – January 7, 2019
- Governor: Butch Otter
- Preceded by: Vicki Risch
- Succeeded by: Teresa Little

Personal details
- Born: Lori Jean Easley; January 4, 1967 (age 59) Pensacola, Florida, U.S.
- Party: Republican
- Spouse: Butch Otter (m. 2006)
- Education: Boise State University (BA); Northwest Nazarene University (M.Ed)
- Profession: Educator; School administrator

Lori Otter (née Easley; born January 4, 1967) is an American educator, author, and former beauty queen who served as first lady of Idaho from 2007 to 2019 as the wife of Governor Butch Otter. She was crowned Miss Idaho USA in 1991.

== Career ==
Otter won the Miss Idaho USA title in 1991 and represented Idaho in the Miss USA 1991 pageant broadcast live from Wichita, Kansas, in February 1991.

Otter taught K-12 physical education, English, and health. She coached girls basketball and volleyball at the junior high and high school levels for 13 years, in the Meridian School District in Meridian, Idaho.

== Personal life ==
During her year as Miss Idaho USA, she met Butch Otter, who was then serving as Lieutenant Governor of Idaho. She returned to Idaho in 1995 after teaching and coaching in Arizona. Lori and Butch were married in Meridian, Idaho, on August 18, 2006. Butch Otter was elected governor of Idaho in November 2006, and, upon taking office two months later, Lori Easley Otter became First Lady of Idaho.

A former marathon runner, Otter jogs and rides horses. Otter currently resides in Star.

Preceded by Cindy Estey	Miss Idaho USA; 1991	Succeeded by Cheryl Lin Myers
Preceded by Vicki Risch	First Lady of Idaho; 2007-2019	Succeeded by Teresa Little
