= Compton I. White =

American politician

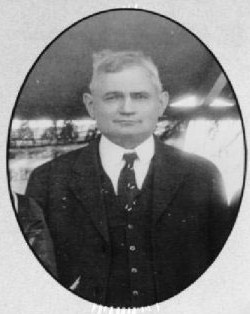

Member of the U.S. House of Representatives from Idaho's 1st district
- In office January 3, 1949 – January 3, 1951
- Preceded by: Abe Goff
- Succeeded by: John Travers Wood
- In office March 4, 1933 – January 3, 1947
- Preceded by: Burton L. French
- Succeeded by: Abe Goff

Personal details
- Born: Compton Ignatius White; July 31, 1877 Baton Rouge, Louisiana, U.S.
- Died: March 31, 1956 (aged 78) Spokane, Washington, U.S.
- Resting place: White Family Cemetery; Clark Fork, Idaho, US
- Party: Democratic
- Spouse(s): Josephine Elizabeth Bunn (m. 1891; died 1951)
- Children: 2, including Compton Jr.
- Education: Gonzaga College, 1897
- Profession: Railroad, Agriculture, Mining

Compton Ignatius White Sr. (July 31, 1877 – March 31, 1956), was a U.S. representative for Northern Idaho. A Democrat, he represented Idaho's 1st congressional district and served a total of eight terms and chaired a committee.

== Early years ==
Born in Baton Rouge, Louisiana, Compton White moved during early childhood to Rankin County, Mississippi, and then in 1890 to Clark Fork, Idaho. As a young man, he delivered newspapers while attending public school. He attended Metropolitan Business College in Chicago, Illinois, and graduated from Gonzaga College in Spokane, Washington, in 1897.

== Career ==
He worked on railroads in a number of capacities, as a trainman, conductor, and telegraph operator, until 1910. After this stretch, he worked in lumber, mining, and livestock raising; he was also a member of the Clark Fork Board of Trustees. In 1925, White received an unexpected windfall when a valuable mine of galena ore was found on his property. It was this unexpected find that gave his family a small fortune and allowed him to become a real player in Idaho politics. He was a delegate to the Democratic National Convention in 1928, 1932, and 1936, during which period he rose to prominence as a politician.

== Congress ==
White first sought election to Congress during the 1930 election; he gained the Democratic nomination, but was soundly defeated by longtime Republican incumbent Burton French of Moscow. Both were nominated again in 1932 and White unseated French as Franklin D. Roosevelt's landslide victory swept the nation.

Like many rural politicians during the Great Depression, White sought policies and legislation that enabled farmers in Idaho to stabilize their finances and enhance their agricultural output. White was also a supporter of President Franklin D. Roosevelt's New Deal, which helped thousands of families in Idaho from 1933 to 1939.

Due to a strong interest in reclamation projects in Idaho and the Pacific Northwest in general, White chaired the now-defunct Irrigation committee while in Congress, and also was a member of the Committee on Coins, Weights and Measures.

One of Congressman White's major accomplishments while in office was the acceptance and use of silver certificates by the Department of the Treasury. The American Silver Purchase Act of 1934 was a major win for White and the silver mining industry in Idaho, Montana, and Colorado, as the federal government had purchased silver at prices well above market value, which enabled mine operators to remain in business during the Great Depression. Congressman White was also instrumental in bringing large irrigation projects to Idaho, including the Bonneville Dam project in 1938 and the Grand Coulee Dam project in 1941.

Although he left Mississippi with his family at a relatively early age, White deeply internalized the racial views of his birthplace, railing against the Chinese during the debate over the repeal of the Chinese Exclusion Act in 1943, arguing that "There is no melting pot in America that can change their habits or change their mentality."

He sought re-election to an eighth term in the 1946 race but was narrowly defeated by Republican Abe M. Goff of Moscow.

In the 1948 election, White defeated Goff and returned to the House but had lost his seniority. In 1950, he sought the Democratic nomination for the U.S. Senate, but it went to D. Worth Clark of Pocatello. At age 75, White sought the party's nomination in 1952 to regain his House seat in the 1st District, but lost to Gracie Pfost of Nampa. He retired from public life and died in Spokane in 1956, where he had lived for three years, and was buried in the family cemetery in Clark Fork.

His only son, Compton I. White, Jr. (1920–1998), was also elected to Congress for the First District in 1962 and 1964. He lost elections in 1966 and 1968.

=== Election results ===
U.S. House elections (Idaho's 1st district): Results 1930–1948
Year	Democrat	Votes	Pct	Republican	Votes	Pct	3rd party	Party	Votes	Pct
1930	Compton White	18,657	35.1%	Burton French (inc.)	34,527	64.9%				
1932	Compton White	42,784	54.9%	Burton French (inc.)	32,545	41.8%	A. Cornell	Liberty	2,614	3.4%
1934	Compton White (inc.)	42,323	62.0%	Burton French	25,969	38.0%				
1936	Compton White (inc.)	58,941	70.3%	John Hackathorn	24,959	29.7%				
1938	Compton White (inc.)	48,318	62.8%	Rex Hensen	28,640	37.2%				
1940	Compton White (inc.)	62,107	62.0%	Edward Gaffney	37,999	38.0%				
1942	Compton White (inc.)	30,105	54.1%	H. C. Baldridge	25,562	45.9%				
1944	Compton White (inc.)	49,581	56.6%	Robert Brainard	37,998	43.4%				
1946	Compton White (inc.)	36,509	49.4%	Abe Goff	37,326	50.6%				
1948	Compton White	46,846	51.8%	Abe Goff (inc.)	41,404	45.7%	Thomas B. Wood	Progressive	2,176	2.4%

U.S. House of Representatives
Preceded by Burton L. French	United States House of Representatives, Idaho First Congressional District; March 4, 1933–January 3, 1947	Succeeded by Abe Goff
Preceded by Abe Goff	United States House of Representatives, Idaho First Congressional District; January 3, 1949–January 3, 1951	Succeeded by John Travers Wood
Political offices
Preceded by Dennis Chavez; New Mexico	Chairman of the United States House Committee on Irrigation and Reclamation; January 3, 1935–December 19, 1944	Succeeded by John R. Murdock; Arizona
