= Len Jordan =

American politician (1899–1983)

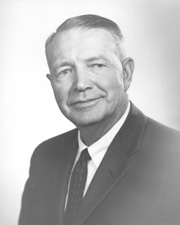

United States Senator from Idaho
- In office August 6, 1962 – January 3, 1973
- Preceded by: Henry Dworshak
- Succeeded by: Jim McClure

23rd Governor of Idaho
- In office January 1, 1951 – January 3, 1955
- Lieutenant: Edson Deal
- Preceded by: C. A. Robins
- Succeeded by: Robert Smylie

Member of the Idaho Senate
- In office 1946–1948

Personal details
- Born: Leonard Beck Jordan; May 15, 1899 Mount Pleasant, Utah, U.S.
- Died: June 30, 1983 (aged 84) Boise, Idaho, U.S.
- Resting place: Cloverdale Memorial Park, Boise
- Party: Republican
- Spouse: Grace Edgington Jordan (m. 1924–1983)
- Children: 3
- Education: University of Oregon

Military service
- Allegiance: United States
- Branch/service: U.S. Army
- Years of service: 1917–1919
- Rank: Second lieutenant
- Unit: machine gun company
- Battles/wars: World War I (stateside)

Leonard Beck Jordan (May 15, 1899 – June 30, 1983) was an American politician who served as the 23rd governor of Idaho and a United States Senator for over ten years.

== Early life and education ==
Born in Mount Pleasant, Utah, Jordan's father was a county judge and his mother was a schoolteacher; the family relocated to northeast Oregon and he was educated in the public schools of Enterprise, the seat of Wallowa County.

From a large family, Jordan worked on a ranch then enlisted in the U.S. Army at age 18 in 1917. After two years in the service, he attended the University of Oregon on a football scholarship, and was a 175-pound (79 kg) halfback for the Webfoots. Jordan graduated in 1923, and was awarded a key to Phi Beta Kappa. He married classmate Grace Edington on December 30, 1924.

== Career ==
Jordan was commissioned as a second lieutenant in the U.S. Army during World War I, but did not serve overseas. After college, he was a sheep rancher in Hells Canyon in Idaho during the Great Depression at Kirkwood Bar, and then settled in Grangeville in 1940, where he established a farm implement business, a real estate agency, and an automobile dealership.

Jordan was elected to the Idaho Senate in 1946 but lost his seat in 1948.

=== Governor (1951–1955) ===
Jordan successfully ran for governor in 1950.

During his four-year term, slot machines were banned; employment, unemployment, and job training services were merged; and the state highway commission was initiated. Jordan did not run for re-election in 1954 because it was not allowed at the time. Starting with the 1946 election, Idaho changed from two-year to four-year terms for governor, but disallowed self-succession (re-election). Jordan's successor as governor was the former attorney general, Robert Smylie, who successfully lobbied the 1955 legislature to propose an amendment to the state constitution to allow gubernatorial re-election, which was approved by voters in the 1956 general election. (Smylie was re-elected in 1958 and 1962, and sought a fourth term in 1966, but was defeated in the primary.)

In 1955, Jordan was appointed by President Eisenhower as Chairman of the United States section of the International Joint Commission with Canada.

== U.S. Senate career ==
=== Appointment and special election of 1962 ===
In August 1962, Jordan was appointed to the U.S. Senate by Governor Smylie, following the death of Henry Dworshak in July. In November, Jordan defeated Democratic congresswoman Gracie Pfost of Nampa in the special election to complete the remaining four years of the term.

=== Election of 1966 ===
Jordan was elected to a full term in 1966, defeating former Democratic congressman Ralph R. Harding of Blackfoot.

=== Legislative record ===
In the Senate, Jordan helped Frank Church establish the Sawtooth National Recreation Area in 1972, and voted in favor of the Civil Rights Acts of 1964 and 1968, as well as the Voting Rights Act of 1965 and the confirmation of Thurgood Marshall to the U.S. Supreme Court. He also voted in favor of the Equal Rights Amendment.

In August 1971, Jordan announced that he would not seek re-election in 1972, and was succeeded by Jim McClure, the three-term Republican congressman from the first district. At age 73, Jordan was the first from Idaho to voluntarily retire from the U.S. Senate.

== Election results ==
Idaho Gubernatorial Elections: Results 1950
Year	Democrat	Votes	Pct	Republican	Votes	Pct
1950	Calvin Wright	97,150	47.4%	Len B. Jordan	107,642	52.6%

U.S. Senate elections in Idaho (Class II): Results 1962–1966
Year	Democrat	Votes	Pct	Republican	Votes	Pct
1962	Gracie Pfost	126,398	49.1%	Len B. Jordan (inc.^)	131,279	50.9%
1966	Ralph Harding	112,637	44.6%	Len B. Jordan (inc.)	139,819	55.4%

Source:^ Jordan was appointed to the vacant seat in August 1962

== Legacy and death ==
A state office building in Boise, near the state capitol, was named for him in December 1973. Jordan died at age 84 in Boise on June 30, 1983, and his wife died two years later. They are interred at Cloverdale Memorial Park in west Boise.

Daughter Patricia (1927–2010) married Charles F. Story, Jr. (1926–2014) of Spokane in 1951; and they later lived in Boise. Eldest son Joseph (1929–2015) graduated from the U.S. Military Academy (West Point) in 1952 and served three years in the U.S. Army. He went to graduate school in civil engineering at Iowa State University in Ames and was a district vice president with Morrison-Knudsen in Alaska. Youngest son Stephen (1932–2015) graduated from the University of Idaho in Moscow in 1955 in mechanical engineering, and worked for General Electric.

Party political offices
Preceded by C. A. Robins	Republican Party nominee, Governor of Idaho; 1950 (won)	Succeeded by Robert Smylie
Preceded by Henry Dworshak	Republican Party nominee, U.S. Senator (Class 2) from Idaho; 1962 special (won), 1966 (won)	Succeeded by Jim McClure
Political offices
Preceded by C. A. Robins	Governor of Idaho; January 1, 1951 – January 3, 1955	Succeeded by Robert Smylie
U.S. Senate
Preceded by Henry Dworshak	U.S. senator (Class 2) from Idaho; August 6, 1962 – January 3, 1973; Served alongside: Frank Church	Succeeded by Jim McClure
