= Clark Fork, Idaho =

- City
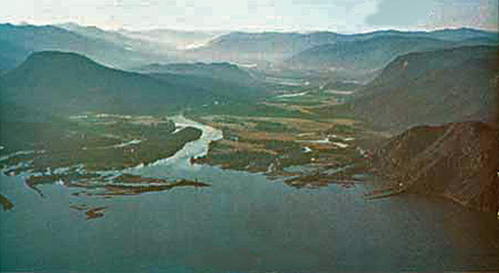
- Clark Fork (located to the left/north) of the Clark Fork River, which runs down the middle

- Location of Clark Fork in Bonner County, Idaho.
- Coordinates: 48°08′50″N 116°10′37″W
- Country: United States
- State: Idaho
- County: Bonner

Area
  - Total: 0.98 sq mi (2.55 km^{2})
  - Land: 0.98 sq mi (2.55 km^{2})
  - Water: 0 sq mi (0.00 km^{2})
- Elevation: 2,093 ft (638 m)

Population (2020)
  - Total: 513
  - Density: 521/sq mi (201/km^{2})
- Time zone: UTC-8 (Pacific (PST))
  - Summer (DST): UTC-7 (PDT)
- ZIP code: 83811
- Area codes: 208, 986
- FIPS code: 16-14950
- GNIS feature ID: 2409468
- Website: clarkforkidaho.gov

Clark Fork is a city in Bonner County, Idaho. The population was 513 at the time of the 2020 census.

== Geography ==
Clark Fork is situated on the Clark Fork River, on the eastern shores of Lake Pend Oreille. in the northern panhandle of the state. According to the United States Census Bureau, the city has a total area of 0.92 square miles (2.38 km^{2}), all of it land. The Lightning Creek passes just north and west of the town.

== History ==
The Kutenai Indians have lived in the area around Lake Pend Oreille for centuries, well before the first Europeans explored the North American wilderness.

The town of Clark Fork was named in honor of William Clark, who along with Meriwether Lewis, headed the expedition through the western American wilderness in 1804. It is believed the Lewis and Clark party encountered the Clark Fork River near present-day Missoula, Montana, in October 1805. After the Lewis and Clark Expedition, fur traders would pass through the area. The origins of an actual town date back to when the Northern Pacific Railway constructed a line adjacent to the Clark Fork River, near the eastern shore of Lake Pend Oreille in the early 1880s. By the 1890s a ferry boat service was used to cross the river or to travel as far as Heron, Montana, about 12 miles (20 km) upriver.

Clark Fork is a small town that focuses on agriculture, forestry, small businesses and tourism (camping, hunting and fishing).

=== Climate ===
This climatic region is typified by large seasonal temperature differences, with warm to hot (and often humid) summers and cold (sometimes severely cold) winters. According to the Köppen Climate Classification system, Clark Fork has a humid continental climate, abbreviated "Dfb" on climate maps.

== Demographics ==
Historical population
Census	Pop.	Note	%±
1920	325		—
1930	432		32.9%
1940	430		−0.5%
1950	387		−10.0%
1960	452		16.8%
1970	367		−18.8%
1980	449		22.3%
1990	448		−0.2%
2000	530		18.3%
2010	536		1.1%
2020	513		−4.3%
U.S. Decennial Census

=== 2010 census ===
As of the census of 2010, there were 536 people, 260 households, and 138 families living in the city. The population density was 582.6 inhabitants per square mile (224.9/km^{2}). There were 308 housing units at an average density of 334.8 per square mile (129.3/km^{2}). The racial makeup of the city was 95.5% White, 0.7% Native American, 0.6% Asian, 0.6% from other races, and 2.6% from two or more races. Hispanic or Latino of any race were 0.9% of the population.

There were 260 households, of which 24.6% had children under the age of 18 living with them, 40.4% were married couples living together, 7.7% had a female householder with no husband present, 5.0% had a male householder with no wife present, and 46.9% were non-families. 41.9% of all households were made up of individuals, and 19.2% had someone living alone who was 65 years of age or older. The average household size was 2.06 and the average family size was 2.87.

The median age in the city was 45.5 years. 21.6% of residents were under the age of 18; 7.2% were between the ages of 18 and 24; 19.8% were from 25 to 44; 32.5% were from 45 to 64; and 18.8% were 65 years of age or older. The gender makeup of the city was 50.6% male and 49.4% female.

=== 2000 census ===
As of the census of 2000, there were 530 people, 238 households, and 138 families living in the city. The population density was 538.8 inhabitants per square mile (208.0/km^{2}). There were 286 housing units at an average density of 290.7 per square mile (112.2/km^{2}). The racial makeup of the city was 93.96% White, 0.57% African American, 1.32% Native American, 0.19% Asian, 1.70% from other races, and 2.26% from two or more races. Hispanic or Latino of any race were 3.02% of the population.

There were 238 households, out of which 24.4% had children under the age of 18 living with them, 47.5% were married couples living together, 8.0% had a female householder with no husband present, and 42.0% were non-families. 37.4% of all households were made up of individuals, and 16.4% had someone living alone who was 65 years of age or older. The average household size was 2.22 and the average family size was 2.94.

In the city, the population was spread out, with 24.7% under the age of 18, 4.9% from 18 to 24, 28.3% from 25 to 44, 24.0% from 45 to 64, and 18.1% who were 65 years of age or older. The median age was 40 years. For every 100 females, there were 101.5 males. For every 100 females age 18 and over, there were 95.6 males.

The median income for a household in the city was $22,031, and the median income for a family was $28,472. Males had a median income of $28,036 versus $21,042 for females. The per capita income for the city was $13,979. About 15.3% of families and 20.8% of the population were below the poverty line, including 19.0% of those under age 18 and 20.2% of those age 65 or over.

== Notable people ==
- Ron Heller (born 1963), former NFL tight end
- Compton I. White (1877–1956), eight-term congressman from Idaho
- Compton I. White, Jr., (1920–1998), two-term congressman from Idaho

== See also ==
- List of cities in Idaho
- Clark Fork Junior/Senior High School
