= Compton I. White Jr. =

American politician

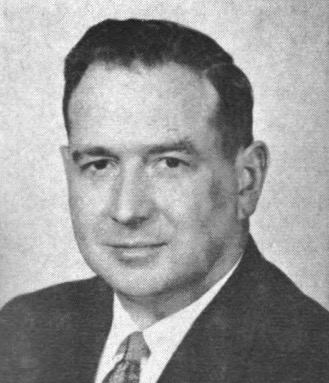
- White in 1963

Member of the U.S. House of Representatives from Idaho's 1st district
- In office January 3, 1963 – January 3, 1967
- Preceded by: Gracie Pfost
- Succeeded by: Jim McClure

Personal details
- Born: Compton Ignatius White Jr. December 19, 1920 Spokane, Washington, U.S.
- Died: October 19, 1998 (aged 77) Sandpoint, Idaho, U.S.
- Resting place: White Family Cemetery; Clark Fork, Idaho, U.S.
- Party: Democratic
- Spouse: Florence Eulalia Waddell White
- Children: 6
- Education: University of Idaho; George Washington University
- Profession: Agriculture, Mining

Compton Ignatius White Jr. (December 19, 1920 – October 19, 1998) was a two-term congressman from northern Idaho. A Democrat, he was elected to the open seat in the first district in 1962 and re-elected in 1964. White left office in January 1967 and was the last from the Idaho Panhandle region to represent the state in Congress.

== Early years ==
The son of Congressman Compton I. White and Josephine Elizabeth White (née Bunn), White was born in Spokane, Washington, and grew up in his family's hometown of Clark Fork, Idaho, and in Washington, D.C. He attended George Washington University in Washington, D.C. for his freshman year of college, then transferred to the University of Idaho in Moscow, where he graduated in 1942.

During World War II, White worked as an engineer for Boeing in Seattle, and also in mining, logging, and livestock breeding. After the war, he returned to Clark Fork and served on the school board. From 1958 to 1962 White served as mayor of Clark Fork.

== Congress ==
In 1960, White announced his candidacy for the U.S. Senate seat held by Republican Henry Dworshak, but was third of five in the Democratic primary. Runner-up Bob McLaughlin of Mountain Home won the runoff over leader Gregg Potvin of American Falls, but lost the general election. That seat was open again in 1962 after Dworshak's death in July, and Gracie Pfost was the Democratic nominee, vacating her 1st district seat in the House. White won the Democratic primary and general election, the same seat his father held for eight terms.

White was re-elected in the Democratic landslide of 1964, but was defeated for a third term in 1966 by Republican state senator Jim McClure of Payette, who defeated him again in 1968.

U.S. House elections (Idaho's 1st district): Results 1962–1968
Year	Democrat	Votes	Pct	Republican	Votes	Pct
1962	Compton I. White Jr.	51,422	53.0%	Erwin H. Schwiebert	45,552	47.0%
1964	Compton I. White Jr. (inc.)	56,203	51.7%	John Mattmiller	52,468	48.3%
1966	Compton I. White Jr. (inc.)	65,446	48.2%	Jim McClure	70,410	51.8%
1968	Compton I. White Jr.	62,002	40.6%	Jim McClure (inc.)	90,870	59.4%

== After Congress ==
White secured a position as a consultant with the U.S. Treasury Department in 1967. Unopposed for the Democratic nomination in 1968, he ran again against the incumbent McClure, but lost by a large margin. Afterwards, White returned to Clark Fork and served on its city council, as well as working in ranching once again.

His grandson, Ryan M. White, currently serves as Chief of Staff for Idaho Senator Jim Risch.

U.S. House of Representatives
Preceded by Gracie Pfost	United States House of Representatives, Idaho First Congressional District; January 3, 1963–January 3, 1967	Succeeded by Jim McClure
