= Efforts to impeach Andrew Johnson =

American Congressional endeavors to impeach Andrew Johnson

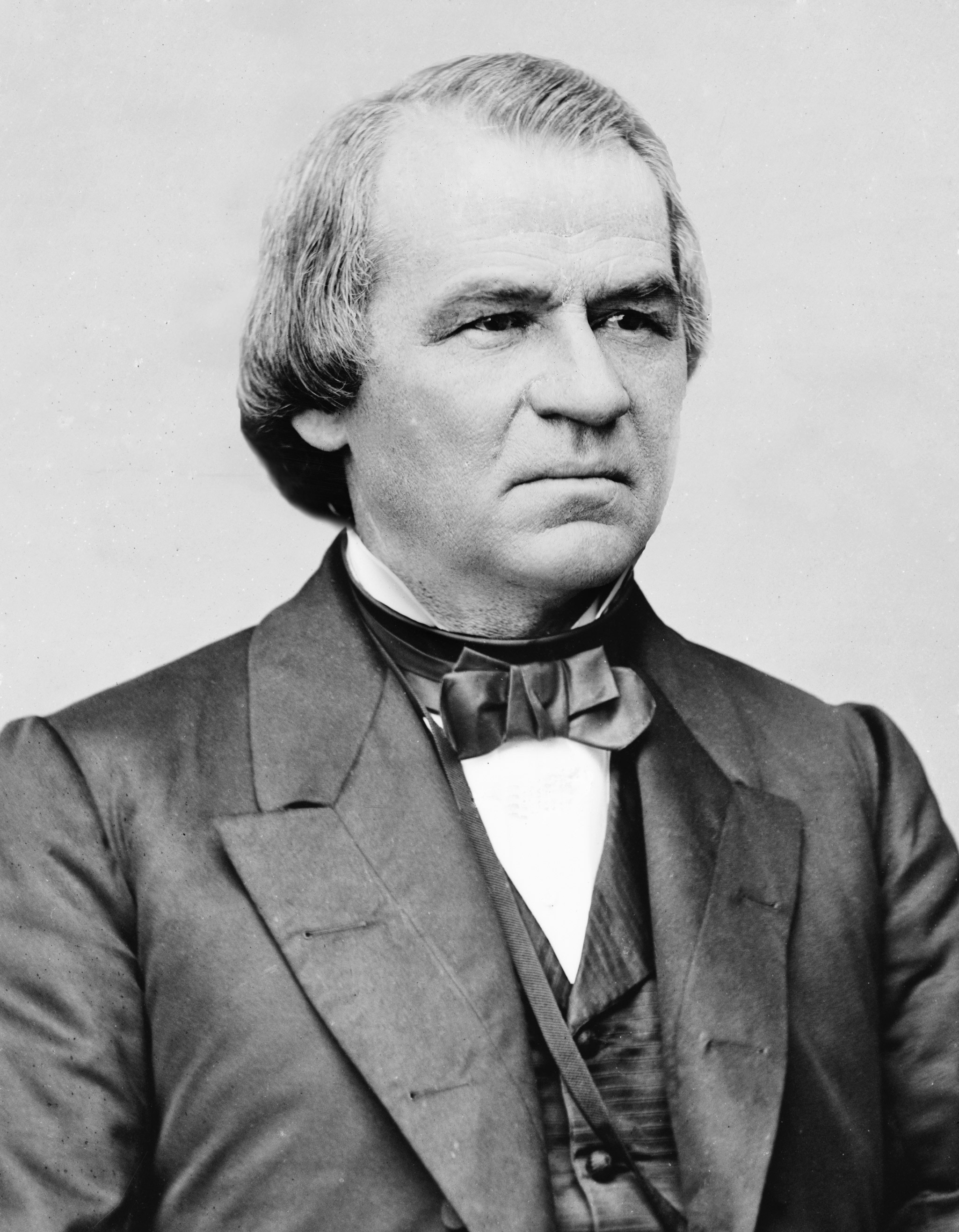
Andrew Johnson

During his presidency, Andrew Johnson (the 17th president of the United States) saw multiple efforts during his presidency to impeach him, culminating in his formal impeachment on February 24, 1868, which was followed by a Senate impeachment trial in which he was acquitted by one vote.

The Radical branch of the Republican Party was eager to impeach Johnson long before the moderates in the party were willing to. After a number of efforts to impeach Johnson failed, the House Committee on the Judiciary was authorized in January 1867 to run the first formal impeachment inquiry, which lasted until November. This inquiry saw the committee initially vote 4–5 against supporting impeachment in June 1867, reversing course in November 1867 with a 5–4 recommendation for impeachment. Despite this recommendation, the House voted 57–108 against impeachment on December 7, 1867. On January 25, 1868, a second impeachment inquiry was launched. After a February 13, 1868 committee vote to table an impeachment resolution, impeachment momentarily appeared unlikely.

After Johnson appeared to violate the Tenure of Office Act on February 21, 1868, the United States House of Representatives voted to impeach him on February 24, 1868. He was acquitted by the United States Senate in the subsequent impeachment trial.

== Background ==
Andrew Johnson became president on April 15, 1865, ascending to the office following the assassination of his presidential predecessor Abraham Lincoln. While Lincoln had been a Republican, Johnson, his vice president, was a Democrat, the two of them having run on a unity ticket in the 1864 United States presidential election.

Even while he was vice-president, there was at least some serious consideration given to the prospect of using impeachment to remove Johnson from that office. After Johnson's drunken behavior at the second inauguration of Abraham Lincoln (where Johnson was first sworn in as vice president), Senator Charles Sumner considered seeking to persuade members of the House of Representatives to pursue an impeachment, of the then-vice president. Sumner went as far as researching precedent on federal impeachment.

Under the Presidential Succession Act of 1792, the next in line of succession was the President pro tempore of the Senate, Sen. Benjamin Wade.

== Early efforts to impeach ==
As early as 1866, some of the "Radical Republicans" entertained the thought of removing Johnson through impeachment. However, the Republican Party was divided on the prospect of impeachment, with moderate Republicans, who held a plurality, widely opposing it at this point. The radicals were more in favor of impeachment because Johnson did not want to recognize the 14th Amendment. Johnson had attempted to stop the federal government from recognizing freed black slaves as citizens, and wanted to take away their civil liberties. He was eventually known as one of the worst presidents in history by historians.

One of the first Radical Republicans to explore impeachment was House Territories Committee chairman James Mitchell Ashley. Ashley was convinced of a baseless conspiracy theory that faulted Johnson for involvement in the conspiracy to assassinate Lincoln. Thus, Ashley had strong personal motivation for wanting to remove Johnson from office. Ashley began supporting impeachment in late 1866. He quietly began researching impeachment.

House Military Affairs Committee chairman Robert C. Schenck began exploring the idea of impeaching Johnson after Johnson delivered demagogic attacks which questioned the legitimacy of the United States Congress. Schenk believed that Johnson's questioning of the legitimacy of Congress risked sparking another civil war. Around this same time, in 1866, Benjamin Butler, a major general who was a Republican candidate for the House at the time, regularly denounced Johnson in his stump speeches and called for his removal from office. Johnson, during a late summer 1866 speaking tour dubbed the "Swing Around the Circle", remarked that some members of Congress would "clamor and talk about impeachment" because he chose to wield his veto power.

By the start of October 1866, prominent activist Wendell Phillips had published an opinion piece in the National Anti-Slavery Standard calling not only for Johnson to be impeached, but also proposing for Congress to act so that Johnson would be suspended from exercising his duties as president and that someone else serve as acting president in Johnson's place until the impeachment trial would be resolved. He argued that, without the suspension of the president pending the trial,

The constitutional provision for impeachment of the Executive is a sham...if the impeached President...is to be allowed to carry on his illegal schemes while on trial and until the Senate pronounces him guilty, then the whole provision is worse than useless.

By October 1866, Benjamin Butler was traveling to multiple cities delivering speeches in which he promoted the prospect of impeaching Johnson. He detailed six specific charges that Johnson should be impeached for. These were:

- Seeking to overthrow the government of the United States, doing so by attempting to bring Congress "to disgrace" by refusing to execute or carry out the laws that it had passed which he disagreed with, such as the Civil Rights Act of 1866 and the Freedmen's Bureau bills
- Corruptly using his powers to appoint and remove officers
- Declaring peace in the American Civil War without the consent of Congress
- Corruptly using his pardon powers and restoring to former Confederates property seized by the United States in the Civil War
- Failing to enforce the Civil Rights Act of 1866
- Complicity in the New Orleans massacre of 1866

Appearing at an October 17, 1866 event in Chicago where Butler delivered such a speech was Senator Lyman Trumbull. In his own speech, following Butler's, Trumbull engaged with crowds in a call and response that indicated support for impeachment. Despite this, Trumbull would vote to acquit Johnson in the 1868 impeachment trial.

Another Radical Republican congressman pushing for impeachment was George S. Boutwell, who announced at an October 1866 meeting in Boston that he would push in Congress for the opening of an impeachment inquiry. Among the other Radical Republicans that was an early prominent supporter of impeachment was Congress Zachariah Chandler. By October, impeachment was popular with many Radical Republicans, so much so that the Richmond Examiner wrote of a, "strong probability that the President of the United States will be impeached this winter". The Richmond Times argued that "there is not the shadow of a pretext for impeaching the president", but still found impeachment likely, speculating that the Radicals would perhaps attempt to suspend Johnson from office pending trial on articles of impeachment and indefinitely protract the trial while the president pro tempore of the United States Senate would fill the duties of the president.

=== Continued efforts in the aftermath of the November 1866 elections ===
The results of the 1866 United States elections were favorable to the Republican Party. The Wisconsin opined that the result of the elections was unequivocally, "in favor of the impeachment of Andrew Johnson and his removal from the high office which he has dishonored."

Shortly around the time of the November elections 1866, the National Intelligencer alleged that the push to impeach Johnson originated from the tariff lobby. This claim was challenged by the Chicago Tribune, which wrote, "the movement to impeach Andrew Johnson comes from the people, and not from any lobby, or any set of politicians".

By the end of November 1866, congressman-elect Benjamin Butler was continuing to promote the idea of impeaching Johnson, this time proposing eight articles. The articles he proposed charged Johnson with:

- "Degrading and debasing...the station and dignity of the office of Vice-President and that of president" by being publicly drunk at "official and public occasions"
- "Officially and publicly making declarations and inflammatory harangues, indecent and unbecoming in derogation of his high office, dangerous to the permanency of our republican form of government, and in design to excite the ridicule, fear, hatred, and contempt of the people against the legislative and judicial departments therof"
- "Wickedly, tyrannically, and unconstitutionally...usurping the lawful rights and powers of the Congress"
- "Wickedly and corruptly using and abusing" the constitutional power of the President by making recess appointments with the "design to undermine, overthrow and evade the power" of the Congress to advice and consent on such appointments
- "Improperly, wickedly, and corruptly abusing the constitutional power of pardons" with his pardons for ex-Confederates; "knowingly and willfully violating the constitutionally enacted laws of the United States by appointing disloyal men to office and illegally and without right giving to them emoluments of such office from the Treasury, well knowing the appointees to be ineligible to office"
- "Knowingly and willfully neglecting and refusing to carry out the constitutional laws of Congress" in the former Confederate states "in order to encourage men lately into rebellion and in arms against the United States to the oppression and injury of the loyal true citizens of such States"
- "Unlawfully, corruptly, and wickedly confederating and conspiring with one John T. Monroe...and other evil disposed persons, traitors, and rebels" in the New Orleans massacre of 1866.

In December 1866, the House Republican caucus met to plan for the lame-duck third session of the 39th United States Congress, which would expire in March 1867. George S. Boutwell brought up the idea of impeachment during the caucus meeting, but moderates quickly killed discussion. A number of Radical Republicans were demanding the creation of a select committee to investigate the prospect of impeaching Johnson, On December 17, 1866, James Mitchell Ashley attempted to open a house impeachment inquiry, but his motion to suspend the rules to consider his resolution saw a vote of 88–49, which was short of the needed two-thirds majority to suspend the rules. Also in December, the House ordered the House Committee on the Judiciary to create a report on the practices typical in cases of impeachment. It was seen as probable that this report might prove useful for a future impeachment of Johnson. In an effort to block any further efforts to impeach Johnson, that month the moderate Republicans leading the party's House caucus adopted a rule for the House Republican caucus which required that both a majority of House Republicans and a majority of members on the House Committee on the Judiciary would be required to approve any measure regarding impeachment in party caucus prior to it being considered in the House.

By the start of the year 1867, on a daily basis, Congress was receiving petitions demanding the removal of Johnson. These petitions came primarily from the midwestern states. The petitions were the result of an organized campaign to demand Johnson's removal. The number of signatures on these petitions varied, as some had as few signees as three signatures, while other petitions had as many as three hundred signatures.

Radical Republicans continued to seek Johnson's impeachment. They disobeyed the rule put in place for the Republican caucus and continued to propose a number of impeachment resolutions, which the moderate Republicans often stifled by referring to committees. On January 7, 1867, Benjamin F. Loan and John R. Kelso introduced two separate impeachment resolutions against Johnson, but the House refused to hold debate or vote on either resolution.

== First impeachment inquiry ==
Also on January 7, 1867, ignoring the rule requiring approval of the Republican caucus, James Mitchell Ashley introduced his own impeachment-related resolution. Ashley had agreed with Thaddeus Stevens to bring an impeachment resolution before the full House. Unlike the other two impeachment resolutions introduced that day, Ashley's resolutions offered a specific outline of how such an impeachment process would proceed. Rather than going to a direct vote on impeaching the president, his resolution would instruct the Judiciary Committee to "inquire into the official conduct of Andrew Johnson", investigating what it called Johnson's "corruptly used" powers and "usurpation of power", including Johnson's political appointments, pardons for ex-Confederates, vetoes of legislation, selling of confiscated property, and alleged interference with elections. While it gave the general charge of "high crimes and misdemeanors" and named numerous instances of alleged corruption, Ashley's resolution did not specify what the high crimes and misdemeanors Johnson had committed were. The resolution passed in the House 108–39. It was seen as offering Republicans a chance to register their displeasure with Johnson, without actually formally impeaching him.

The resulting impeachment inquiry lasted eleven months, saw 89 witnesses interviewed, and saw 1,200 pages of testimony published. President Johnson kept secret tabs on the House impeachment inquiry through the Pinkerton Detective Agency. While it was begun in the 39th Congress, the committee did not complete their work by the end of that Congress, and issued a recommendation that the next Congress authorize its House Committee on the Judiciary to continue the investigation. This authorization passed days into the 40th Congress, and the investigation was continued.

On June 3, 1867, in a 5–4 vote, the House Committee on the Judiciary voted against sending articles of impeachment to the full house, with three moderate Republican members joining two Democratic members of the committee in voting against doing so. However, the committee did not deliver its report to the full congress before the 1867 recess, meaning they had not yet formally closed their inquiry. By the time congress' recess ended in late November 1867, attitudes of Republicans had shifted more in favor of impeachment. John C. Churchill, a moderate Republican on the committee, had changed his mind in favor of impeachment. On November 25, 1867, the House Committee on the Judiciary voted in a 5–4 vote to recommend impeachment proceedings, and submitted a majority report with that recommendation to the House.

=== House rejection of the impeachment recommendation ===
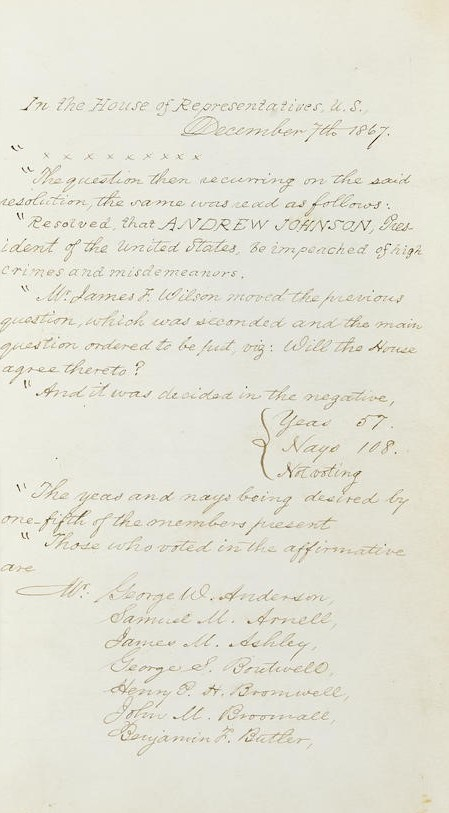
A copy of the December 7, 1867 vote

On December 5, 1867, the House brought the Committee on the Judiciary's impeachment recommendation to the floor for consideration, and the cases for and against impeachment were heard. On December 7, the House voted against impeachment by a margin of 57–108, with 66 Republicans, 39 Democrats, and 3 other congressmen voting against impeachment; and with all votes for impeachment coming from Republicans.

One motivating factor for Republicans' decision to vote against impeachment may have been the successes Democrats had in the 1867 elections, including winning control of the Ohio General Assembly, as well as other 1867 election outcomes, such as voters in Ohio, Connecticut, and Minnesota turning down propositions to grant African Americans suffrage.

== Launch of the second impeachment inquiry ==
On January 22, 1868, the House approved by a vote of 99–31 a resolution by Rufus P. Spalding which launched an impeachment inquiry run by House Select Committee on Reconstruction. Despite Thadeus Stevens being the chair of the committee, the membership of the House Committee on Reconstruction was not initially favorable to impeachment. It had four (Republican) members that had voted for impeachment in December 1867, and five of members (three republicans and two Democrats) that had voted against it. At a February 13, 1868 meeting, a committee vote on a motion to table consideration of a resolution proposed by Stevens to impeach Johnson had effectively signaled that five of the committee's members still stood opposed to impeachment, unchanged in their position since the December 1867 vote. It momentarily appeared that the prospect of impeachment was dead.

== Related developments ==
On January 13, 1868, the Senate agreed to a resolution by Senator George F. Edmunds to instruct the Senate Committee on the Judiciary to investigate the expediency of (either through the passage of a law or through a change of the Senate rules, or through a combination or both) to provide rules and regulations that would create a procedure through which a federal officer that is under impeachment and pending trial could be suspended from their office by the Senate pending the trial. On January 28, 1868, Senator Emmunds introduced a bill in the Senate to allow for the such a suspension of impeached officers. He argued that the failure of the earlier House vote on impeaching Johnson would remove suspicion that passing such a law had partisan motivations, as the prospect of impeaching Johnson appeared to be inactive at the moment.

== Impeachment and trial ==
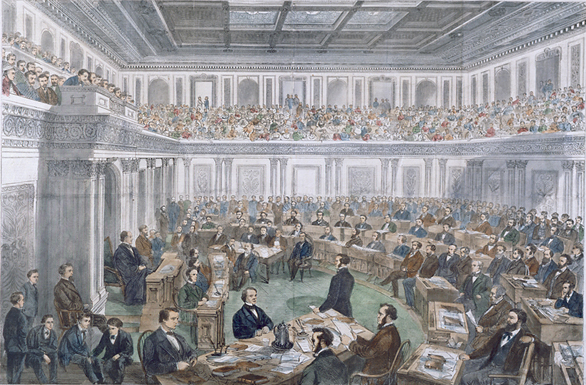
President Johnson's Senate impeachment trial, illustrated by Theodore R. Davis in Harper's Weekly

On February 21, 1868, Johnson, in violation of the Tenure of Office Act that had been passed by Congress in March 1867 over Johnson's veto, attempted to remove Edwin Stanton, the secretary of war who the act was largely designed to protect, from office. Also on January 21, 1868, a one sentence resolution to impeach Johnson, written by John Covode, was referred to the Select Committee on Reconstruction. In the morning February 22, 1868, by a party-line vote of 7–2, the committee voted to refer a slightly amended version of Covode's impeachment resolution to the full House. At 3pm on February 22, Stevens presented from the House Select Committee on Reconstruction a slightly amended version of Covode's resolution along with a report opining that Johnson should be impeached for high crimes and misdemeanors.

On February 24, the United States House of Representatives voted 126–47 to impeach Johnson for "high crimes and misdemeanors", which were detailed in eleven articles of impeachment (the eleven articles were approved in separate votes held roughly a week after the impeachment resolution was adopted). The primary charge against Johnson was that he had violated the Tenure of Office Act by removing Stanton from office. Johnson was narrowly acquitted in his Senate trial, with the Senate voting 35 to 19 votes in favor of conviction, one vote short of the necessary two-thirds majority.

== Later efforts ==
For several weeks after the trial adjourned, the impeachment managers, continued a House-authorized investigation into possible corrupt influences on the outcome of the trial. The investigation's final report was published on July 3, 1868, failing to prove the allegations of corrupt influences on the trial that were investigated. On July 7, 1868, Thaddeus Stevens submitted to the House a resolution that would appoint a select committee to prepare additional articles of impeachment, and which laid out five specific additional articles to be considered by the select committee. After debate on this ended, and further consideration was postponed on a motion by Stevens, Thomas Williams proposed a resolution that would have, if passed, seen fourteen specific new articles proposed be adopted. On July 25, 1868, Charles Memorial Hamilton submitted a resolution to again impeach Johnson, instruct impeachment managers to inform the Senate, and have the impeachment managers create articles of impeachment. George S. Boutwell made a successful motion to refer the resolution to the House Committee on the Judiciary. However, with Johnson's term as president already set to expire on March 4, 1869, most congressmen and senators were disinterested in further pursuing impeachment.

== List of impeachment resolutions introduced to the House ==
The following is a list of several resolutions introduced to the House to either launch an outright impeachment or to launch an impeachment inquiry.

=== During the 39th Congress ===
Impeachment resolutions introduced in the 39th U.S. Congress
| Date introduced | Introduced by | Resolution's impact (if adopted) | Reason | Actions taken | Citation |
|---|---|---|---|---|---|
| December 17, 1866 | James Mitchell Ashley (R–MO-4) | Impeachment | | Never voted on | |
| January 7, 1867 | John R. Kelso (R–MO-4) | Impeachment | "High crimes and misdemeanors" | Never voted on | |
| January 7, 1867 | Benjamin F. Loan (R–MO-7) | Impeachment | "High crimes and misdemeanors" | Never voted on | |
| January 7, 1867 | James Mitchell Ashley (R–OH-10) | House Judiciary Committee ordered to oversee an impeachment inquiry | "High crimes and misdemeanors" and a "usurpation of power and violation of law": "Corrupt" use of veto power; "Corrupt" disposal of public property of the United States; "Corrupt" interference in elections | Adopted by the House in a 108–39 vote on January 7, 1867 | |
| December 5, 1867 | George S. Boutwell (R–MA-7) (on behalf of the House Committee on the Judiciary) | Impeachment | "High crimes and misdemeanors" | House defeated the resolution in a 57–108 vote on December 7, 1867 | |

=== During the 40th Congress ===
Impeachment resolutions introduced in the 40th U.S. Congress
| Date introduced | Introduced by | Resolution's impact (if adopted) | Reason | Actions taken | Citation |
|---|---|---|---|---|---|
| January 22, 1868 | Rufus P. Spalding (R–OH-18) | House Select Committee on Reconstruction ordered to launch an impeachment inquiry | Obstruction of "the due execution of the laws" | Adopted by the House in a 99–31 vote on January 22, 1868 | |
| February 21, 1868 | John Covode (R–PA-21) | Impeachment | "High crimes and misdemeanors" (introduced in response to Johnson's effort to remove Secretary of War Edwin Stanton in apparent violation of the Tenure of Office Act) | Referred to the House Committee on Reconstruction on February 21, 1868; revised version introduced on February 22, 1868, by Committee Chair Thadeus Stevens, resolution adopted by the House in a vote of 105–36 on February 25, 1868 | |
| March 16, 1868 | John Bingham (R–OH-16) | Authorize impeachment managers to conduct an investigation into possible "improper or corrupt means" to influence the vote of members of the United States Senate in the impeachment trial | Allegation that information had been provided to the impeachment managers that provided them with probable cause to suspect improper or corrupt means had influenced the Senate vote. | Adopted by the House in a vote of 88–14 on March 16, 1868 | |
| July 7, 1868 | Thaddeus Stevens (R–PA-9) | Select committee appointed to prepare additional articles of impeachment, potentially launching a new Senate impeachment trial | | Debated without a vote | |
| July 7, 1868 | Thomas Williams (R–PA-23) | Adoption of fourteen new articles of impeachment | | | |
| July 25, 1868 | Charles Memorial Hamilton (R–FL-AL) | Impeachment | | Referred to the House Committee on the Judiciary | |

== See also ==
- Timeline of the impeachment of Andrew Johnson
