= Impeachment inquiry against Andrew Johnson =

The impeachment inquiry against Andrew Johnson may refer to:

- First impeachment inquiry against Andrew Johnson
- Second impeachment inquiry against Andrew Johnson

== See also ==
- Efforts to impeach Andrew Johnson
- Impeachment of Andrew Johnson
- Impeachment trial of Andrew Johnson
- 1868 impeachment managers investigation
- Timeline of the impeachment of Andrew Johnson
