= Timeline of the impeachment of Andrew Johnson =

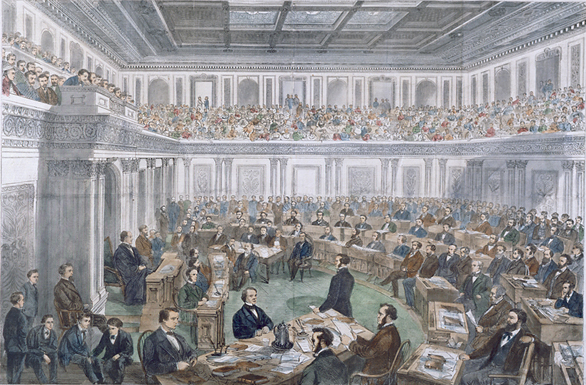
Illustration of the United States Senate convened as a court of impeachment during the impeachment trial

Andrew Johnson became the first president of the United States to be impeached by the United States House of Representatives on February 24, 1868 after he acted to dismiss Edwin Stanton as secretary of war in disregard for the Tenure of Office Act.

Before Johnson's February 21, 1868 effort to dismiss Stanton, there had already been an active push by Radical Republicans to impeach Johnson, but this was met with resistance from many in the moderate wing of the Republican Party. Radical Republicans were frustrated by Johnson's efforts to obstruct their plans for Reconstruction. The Republican Party held a large majority in both chambers of the United States Congress at the time. The early push to impeach Johnson saw the launch of two impeachment inquiries. After the conclusion of the first impeachment inquiry (which saw the House Committee on the Judiciary recommend impeaching Johnson), there was a December 7, 1867 vote in which the House broadly voted against impeaching Johnson. A second impeachment inquiry was launched in January 1868. However, only shortly before Johnson's attempted dismissal of Stanton in February, it had shortly appeared that the prospect of impeachment was a dead issue.

After the February 24, 1868 passage of the resolution impeaching Johnson, eleven articles of impeachment were adopted by the House in early March. An impeachment trial was held by the United States Senate in which Johnson was acquitted on three of the articles before the trial adjourned sine die without voting on the remaining articles of impeachment. All three articles voted on saw an identical acquittal, with the Senate coming only a single vote short of the two-thirds support needed to convict Johnson.

== Early developments and efforts to impeach Johnson ==
=== 1866 ===
Photograph of President Johnson at a banquet held in his honor during the 1866 Swing Around the Circle speaking tour. General Ulysses S. Grant sits to Johnson's left.

- April 15, 1865: Andrew Johnson becomes president following the assassination of Abraham Lincoln.
- August 27–September 15, 1866: President Johnson embarks on the Swing Around the Circle, delivering speeches that would later form the basis for the tenth article of impeachment.
- October 1866: Congressman George S. Boutwell (R– MA) announces that he will lobby in the House of Representatives for the initiation of an impeachment inquiry.
- December 1866: During a meeting of the House Republican caucus to plan for the lame duck third session of the 39th United States Congress, George S. Boutwell (R– PA) brings up the idea of impeachment, but the moderates in the party quickly kill discussion of this.
- December 17, 1866: Congressman James Mitchell Ashley (R– OH) attempts to open a House impeachment inquiry, but his motion to suspend the rules to consider his resolution is met with a vote of 88–49, which is shy of the two-thirds majority required to suspend the rules.
- December 1866: To hamper further efforts to impeach Johnson, the moderates leading the House Republican caucus pass a rule within the caucus that requires for both majority of House Republicans and a majority of members on the House Committee on the Judiciary to first approve any measure regarding impeachment in party caucus before it could be considered by the House.

=== 1867 ===
- January 7, 1867: Congressman James Mitchell Ashley (R– OH) is one of three House Republicans to disregard the House Republican caucus' rule and present an impeachment-related resolution to the House without prior approval by the caucus. Ashley's resolution, which orders an impeachment inquiry to be run the House Committee on the Judiciary, is passed by the House 108–39. This initiates the first impeachment inquiry against Andrew Johnson.
- February 6, 1867: The House Committee on the Judiciary holds the first (closed-door) hearings of its impeachment inquiry, hearing testimony from Lafayette C. Baker.
- March 2, 1867:
  - The House and the Senate vote to enact the Tenure of Office Act, overriding a veto by President Johnson issued earlier that day. The law is designed to prevent the president from being permitted to dismiss an executive officer that been appointed with the advice and consent of the Senate unless the Senate voted to approve the removal during the next full session of Congress. An alleged violation of this law would later be the issue of the impeachment of Johnson.
  - With two days left before the end of the 39th Congress, Congressman James F. Wilson (R– IA) presents to the House a report from the House Committee on the Judiciary recommending that the matter of impeachment receive further review in the next congress, as the committee had run out of time to complete its inquiry in the 39th Congress.
- March 4, 1867:
  - Despite taking formal issue with the Command of Army Act, arguing that it is unconstitutional, President Johnson signs the appropriations bill containing the act. An alleged violation of act would later be the subject of the ninth article of impeachment that was adopted in Johnson's impeachment.
  - The 40th Congress begins, featuring supermajorities for the Republican Party in both chambers of the United States Congress.
- March 7, 1867: On the third day of the 40th Congress, the House votes to renew the first impeachment inquiry against Johnson, tasking the House Committee on the Judiciary with continuing the inquiry that it had begun in the previous Congress.
- March 1867: Radical Republicans, dissatisfied with the slow pace of the House Committee on the Judiciary-run impeachment inquiry, unsuccessfully attempt to secure Republican caucus approval for immediate impeachment.
- June 3, 1867: The House Committee on the Judiciary votes 5–4 against sending an impeachment resolution to the full House, with three moderate Republicans joining the committee's two Democratic members in voting against doing so. The committee, however, does vote to support censuring Johnson.
- July 10, 1867, Congressman James F. Wilson (R– IA) reports verbally to the House on behalf of the House Committee on the Judiciary, by its direction, that the committee expects to be prepared to provide its impeachment inquiry report either on or after October 16. He also informs the House that, as it stands, five members of the committee believed that no high crimes and misdemeanors warranting impeachment had occurred, while the remaining four members believed that they had.
- July 17, 1867: House passes a resolution instructing the House Committee on the Judiciary, as part of its inquiry, to investigate the new charge that Johnson had, at the alleged request of Lincoln assassination conspirator John Surratt's counsel, given a full pardon to Confederate Stephen F. Cameron.
- August 12, 1867: During a congressional recess, President Johnson suspends Secretary of War Edwin Stanton and appoints Ulysses S. Grant to serve as secretary of war ad interim. The Tenure of Office Act prescribes that, when it reconvenes, Senate will be able to vote on whether to approve or reverse Stanton's removal.
- November 25, 1867:
  - The House Committee on the Judiciary, which had not yet reported to Congress the findings of its inquiry, votes 5–4 vote to recommend impeachment proceedings, send an impeachment resolution to Congress, and submit its report to the House. The change from the committee's June 3, 1867 vote came due to moderate Republican member John C. Churchill (R– NY) dropping his previous opposition to impeachment.
  - The House Committee on the Judiciary's impeachment resolution, majority and minority reports, and testimony are reported to the House.
- December 5, 1858: House discusses the impeachment resolution, with a case for and a case against being presented. George S. Boutwell delivers the House Committee on the Judiciary majority's argument in support of impeachment, while James F. Wilson delivers its minority's argument against impeachment.

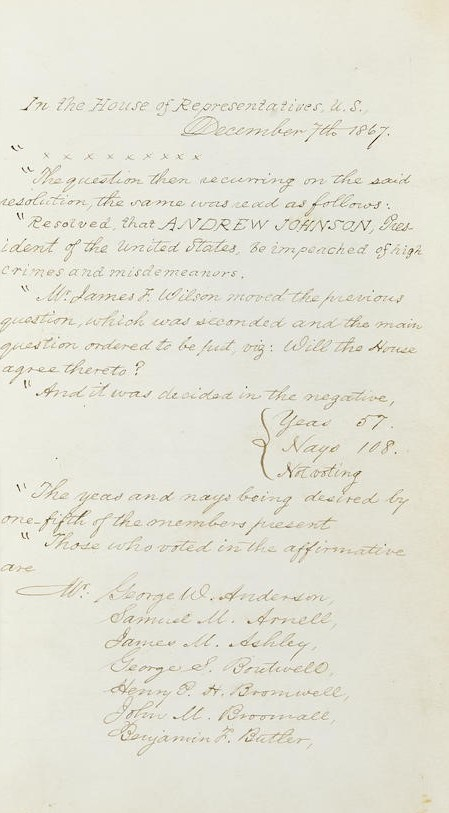
Recording of the December 7, 1867 vote in which the house voted against impeachment

- December 7, 1868: The impeachment resolution is rejected by House in a 57–108 vote (in which more Republicans vote against impeachment than for it).
- December 9, 1867: Angered over the defeat of the impeachment resolution, Radical Republicans meet at the residence of Congressman Thaddeus Stevens (R– PA) to discuss the possibility of creating a separate congressional organization for Radicals, separate from the Republican Party.
- December 13, 1867, members of the House avail themselves of freedom of debate in the Committee of the Whole on the state of the Union, and several members discuss the failed impeachment resolution at length.

=== 1868 ===
- January 13, 1868:
  - Acting under the clause in the Tenure of Office Act granting the Senate a veto over dismissals of Senate-confirmed officers that are made by the president during congressional recesses, the Senate votes overwhelmingly to reinstate Edwin Stanton (who Johnson had suspended as secretary of war on August 12, 1867).
  - The Senate agrees to a resolution by Senator George F. Edmunds (R– VT) to instruct the Senate Committee on the Judiciary to investigate the expediency of (either through the passage of a law or through a change of the Senate rules, or through a combination or both) to provide rules and regulations that would create a procure through which a federal officer that is under impeachment and pending trial could be suspended from their office by the Senate pending the trial.
- January 22, 1868: House votes 99–31 to approve a resolution presented by Rufus P. Spalding (R– OH) launching a second impeachment inquiry against Johnson run by House Select Committee on Reconstruction.
- February 10, 1868: House passes a resolution transferring all records from the previous impeachment inquiry and any further responsibility on impeachment away from the Committee on the Judiciary and to the Select Committee on Reconstruction.
- February 13, 1868: Congressman Thaddeus Stevens (R– PA) introduces a resolution to impeach Johnson to the House Committee on Reconstruction. The committee votes 6–3 to table this matter in what is framed as a proxy vote on impeachment itself, signaling that the committee does not support impeaching Johnson. It briefly appears that impeachment is a dead issue.

== Impeachment and pre-trial ==
- February 21, 1868:
  - Johnson attempts to replace Secretary of War Edwin Stanton with Lorenzo Thomas as ad interim secretary of war in apparent disregard for the Tenure of Office Act. This generates outrage among Congressional Republicans.
  - House approves a resolution presented by Thaddeus Stevens (R– PA) to refer evidence on impeachment from the first impeachment inquiry to the House Select Committee on Reconstruction, and for the select committee to "have leave to report at any time".
  - John Covode (R– PA) presents to the House a resolution to impeach Johnson, which George S. Boutwell (R– MA) successfully motions to have referred to the House Select Committee on Reconstruction.
- February 22, 1868:
  - The House Select Committee on Reconstruction approves an amended version of Covode's impeachment resolution by a party-line 7–2 vote (with all Republicans members voting for it, and all Democratic members voting against it).
  - Thaddeus Stevens (R– PA) presents from the House Select Committee on Reconstruction an amended version of Covode's impeachment resolution and a report opining that Johnson should be impeached for high crimes and misdemeanors. Resolution debated at length before adjournment.

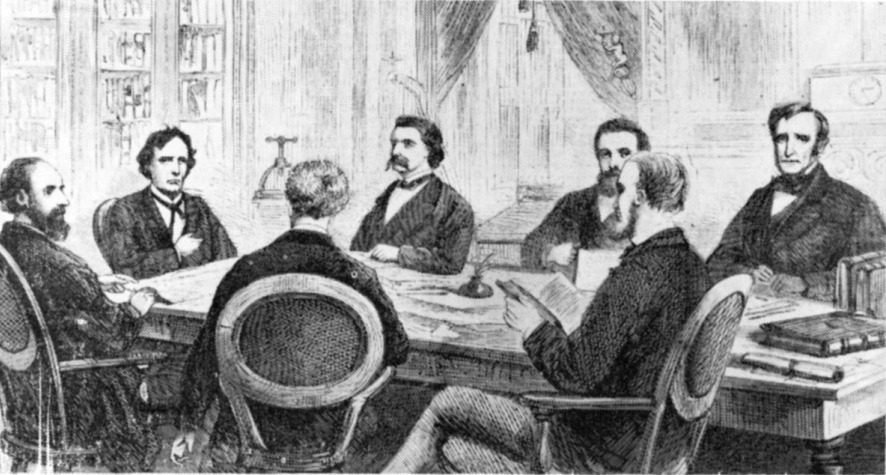
Illustration of the seven-member committee that was created on Feb. 24, 1868 meeting to draft the articles of impeachment. From left to right: Thaddeus Stevens, James F. Wilson, Hamilton Ward (back of head), John A. Logan, George S. Boutwell, George Washington Julian, and John Bingham

- February 24, 1868:
  - The impeachment resolution is debated at length.
  - The impeachment resolution is adopted 126–47 (per the records of the Congressional Globe), thereby impeaching Johnson.
  - The House votes 124–42 to adopt a pair of resolutions presented by Thaddeus Stevens (R– PA), thereby creating a two-person committee to inform the Senate of the impeachment and that the House will "in due time" exhibit specific articles of impeachment and a seven-person committee to prepare and report articles of impeachment.
  - House Speaker Schuyler Colfax (R– IN) appoints John Bingham (R– OH) and Thaddeus Stevens (R– PA) to the two-person committee tasked with informing the Senate of Johnson's impeachment.
  - House Speaker Schuyler Colfax appoints John Bingham (R– OH), George S. Boutwell (R– MA), and Thaddeus Stevens (R– PA), George Washington Julian (R– IN), James F. Wilson (R– IA), John A. Logan (R– IL), and Hamilton Ward (R– NY) to the seven-person committee tasked with writing the articles of impeachment.

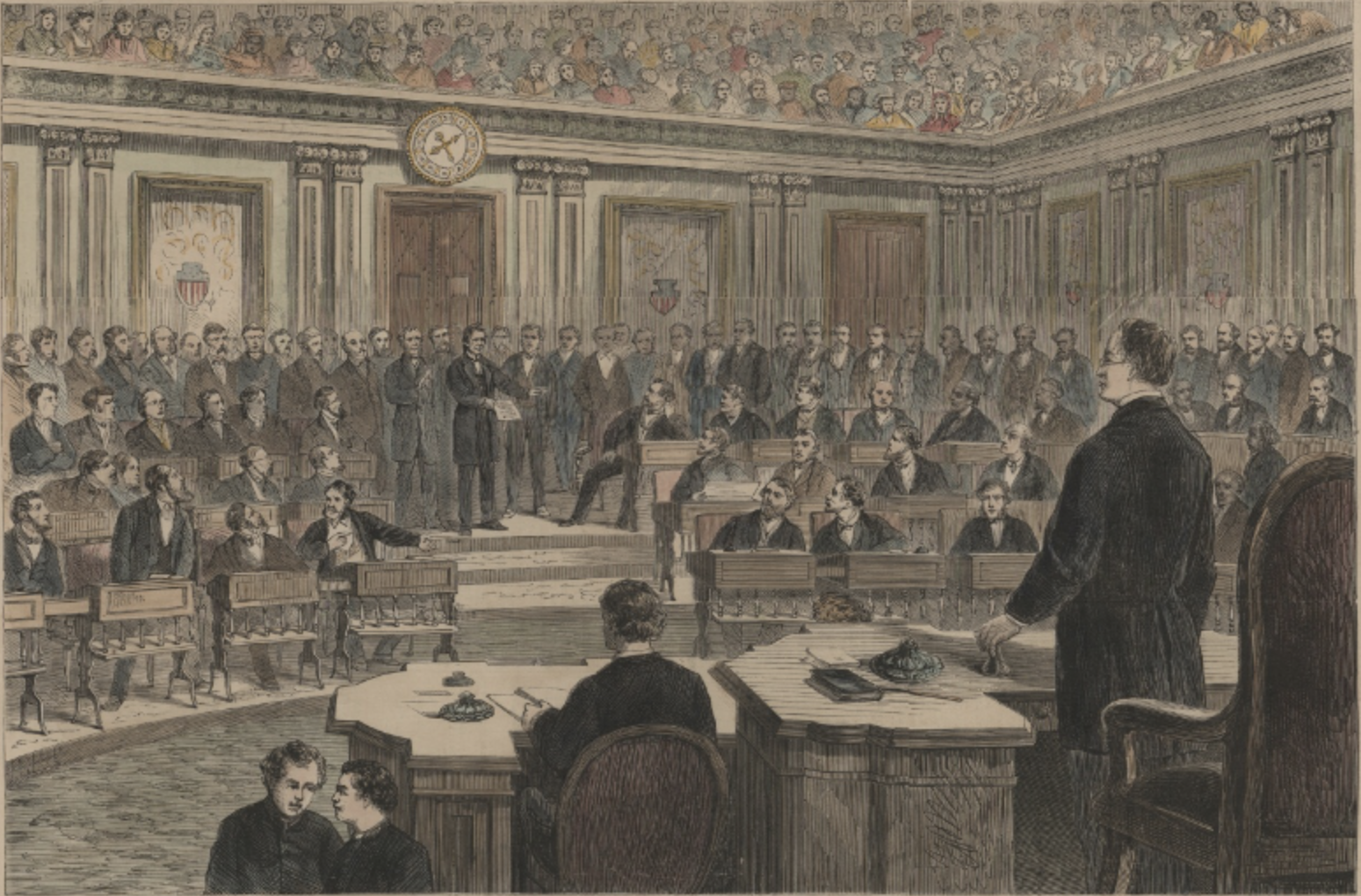
Illustration of the Senate hearing John Bingham and Thaddeus Stevens inform them of the impeachment (Feb. 25, 1868)

- February 25, 1868:
  - The two-person House committee of John Bingham (R– OH) and Thaddeus Stevens (R– PA) informs the Senate bar of the impeachment and the House's intent to create and later present articles of impeachment. Stevens later informs the House that he had gone before the Senate bar on behalf of the House.
  - The Senate creates the Senate Select Committee to Consider and Report on the Message of the House in Relation to the Impeachment of the President to which Roscoe Conkling (R– NY), George F. Edmunds (R– VT), Jacob M. Howard (R– NH), Reverdy Johnson (D– MD), Oliver P. Morton (R– IN), Samuel C. Pomeroy (R– KY), Lyman Trumbull (R– IL) are appointed.
- February 26, 1868: Senator Jacob M. Howard (R– NH) reports to the Senate from the Senate Select Committee to Consider and Report on the Message of the House in Relation to the Impeachment of the President a resolution declaring that the Senate is prepared to receive articles of impeachment. The resolution is adopted by unanimous consent.
- February 28, 1868: Jacob M. Howard (R– NH) reports to the Senate from the Senate Select Committee to Consider and Report on the Message of the House in Relation to the Impeachment of the President the proposed new rules of procedure for impeachment trials that the select committee was tasked with developing.
- February 29, 1868: On behalf of the committee of seven that had been appointed to create articles of impeachment, Congressman George S. Boutwell (R–MA) delivers ten proposed articles of impeachment to the House.

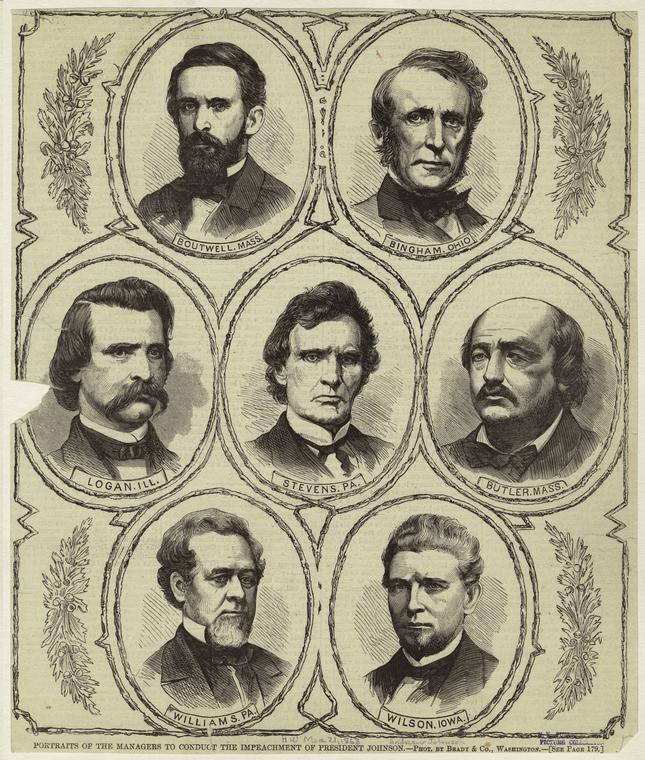
Illustrated portraits of the house impeachment managers, who were chosen by the Republican House caucus on March 1, 1868, and formally appointed by the House on March 2

- March 1, 1868:
  - The House holds its first day of debate on the proposed articles of impeachment.
  - The House Republican caucus holds internal vote in which, by ballot, it selects the congressmen that the caucus will support to serve as impeachment managers (prosecutors in the upcoming impeachment trial). The winners of the balloting are John Bingham (R– OH), George S. Boutwell (R– MA), Benjamin Butler (R– MA), John A. Logan (R– IL), Thaddeus Stevens (R– PA), Thomas Williams (R– PA), and James F. Wilson (R– IA).

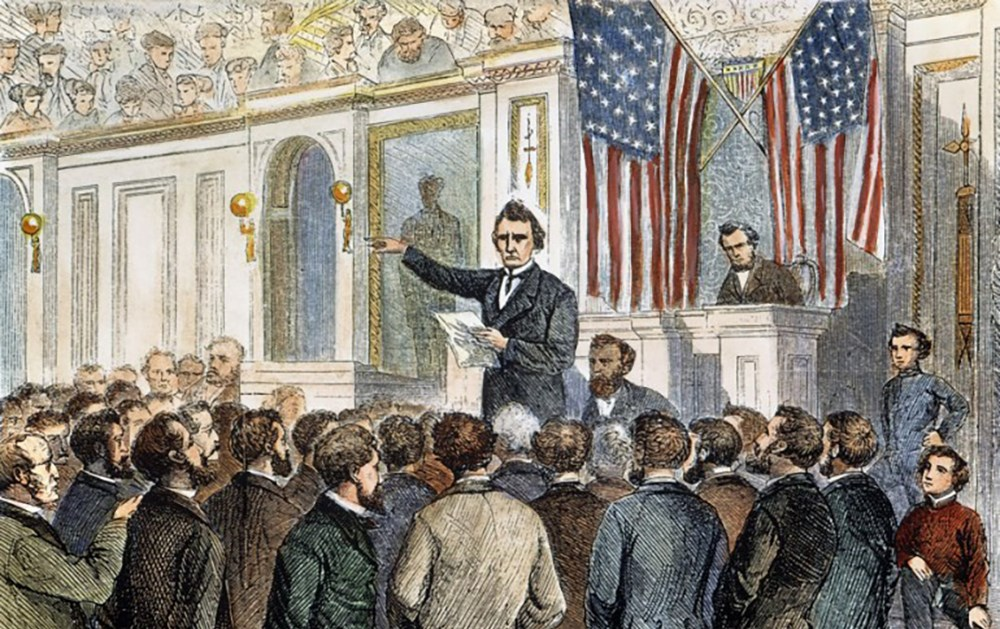
Illustration of Thaddeus Stevens speaking during March 2, 1868 debate on the adoption of articles of impeachment

- March 2, 1868:
  - The House holds continued debate on the proposed articles of impeachment.
  - After the House finishes debate on the proposed articles of impeachment, Congressman George S. Boutwell (R–MA) of the committee tasked with writing articles of impeachment presents the House with revised impeachment articles. The number of articles has been decreased from ten to nine.
  - Congressman Benjamin Butler (R–MA) independently presents the House with a proposed article of impeachment that he had written himself. The House votes to reject this article.
  - Without further debate, the House holds individual votes separately approving each of the nine articles of impeachment that had been delivered to it by the committee of seven that had been appointed to write articles of impeachment.
  - The House, by ballot, elects John Bingham, George S. Boutwell, Benjamin Butler, John A. Logan, Thaddeus Stevens, Thomas Williams and James F. Wilson to serve as impeachment managers.
  - The Senate adopts the new rules of procedure for impeachment trials that had been developed by the Senate Select Committee to Consider and Report on the Message of the House in Relation to the Impeachment of the President.
- March 3, 1868:
  - The impeachment managers present two additional articles of impeachment to the House (one of them being the article by Benjamin Butler that had been rejected the previous day). Both are approved by the House.
  - The Senate receives a message delivered by Edward McPherson (clerk of the United States House of Representatives) informing them of the House's appointment of impeachment managers, and that the managers had been directed to bring the articles of impeachment to the Senate and exhibit them to the Senate.

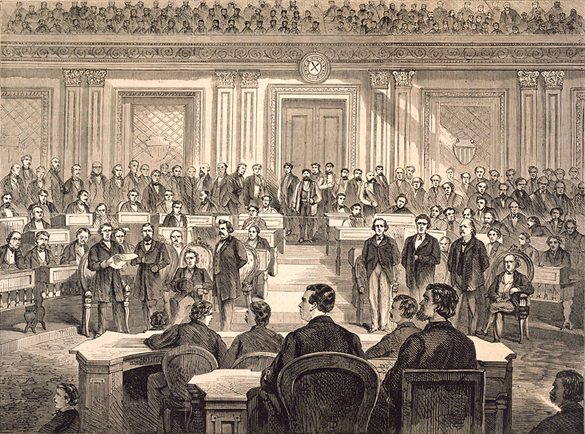
Congressman John Bingham reads the articles of impeachment to the Senate (March 4, 1868)

- March 4, 1868:
  - At 1pm, Congressman John Bingham appears before the Senate and presents the articles of impeachment.
  - The Senate votes to convene as a court of impeachment the next day.
  - The Senate resolves that, once senators are seated as jurors, the Senate will receive the impeachment managers.
  - The Senate adopts a resolution ordering that the Senate provide notice to the chief justice and request his attendance as presiding officer.

== Impeachment trial ==
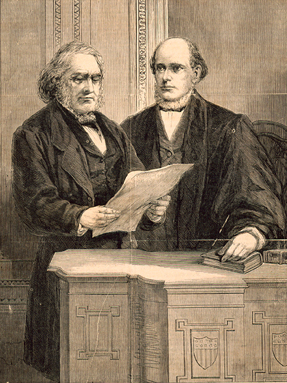
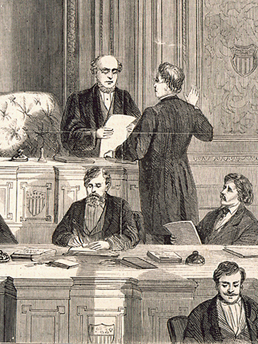
First illustration:Associate justice of the Supreme Court Samuel Nelson administers oath to Chief Justice Salmon P. Chase (March 5, 1868)
Second illustration:Chief Justice Chase administering the juror's oath to Senator Benjamin Wade (March 6, 1868)
- March 5, 1868:
  - At 1pm, the Senate convenes as a court of impeachment. Oaths are administered to Chief Justice of the United States Salmon P. Chase (the presiding officer of the trial) by Associate justice of the Supreme Court Samuel Nelson. Chase begins administering individual juror's oaths to all senators alphabetically until Thomas A. Hendricks (D– IN) questions Benjamin Wade’s (R– OH) impartiality due to Wade's position as president pro tempore of the Senate placing him next-in-line for the presidency. Debate ensues about Wade's fitness to serve as a juror.
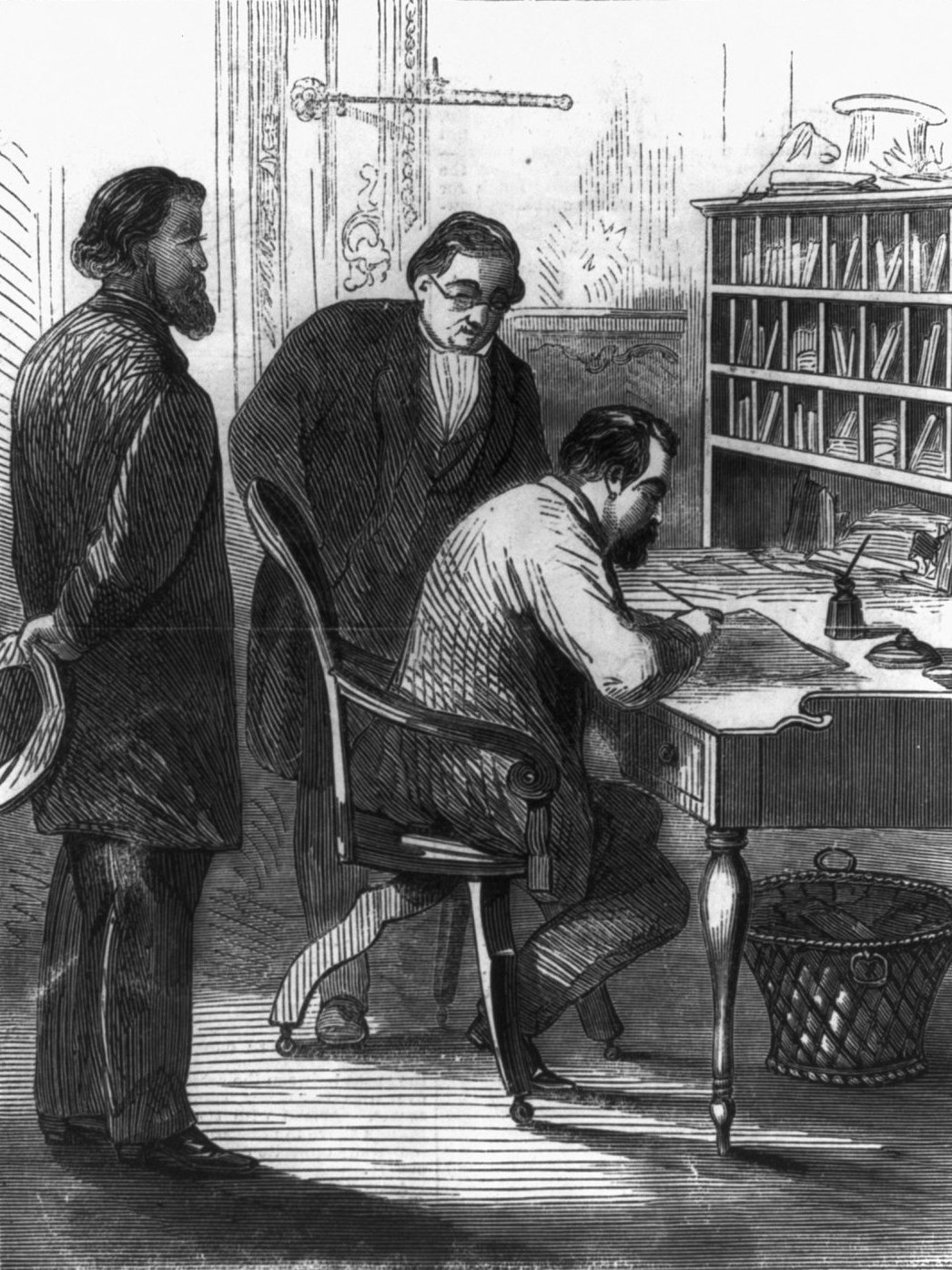
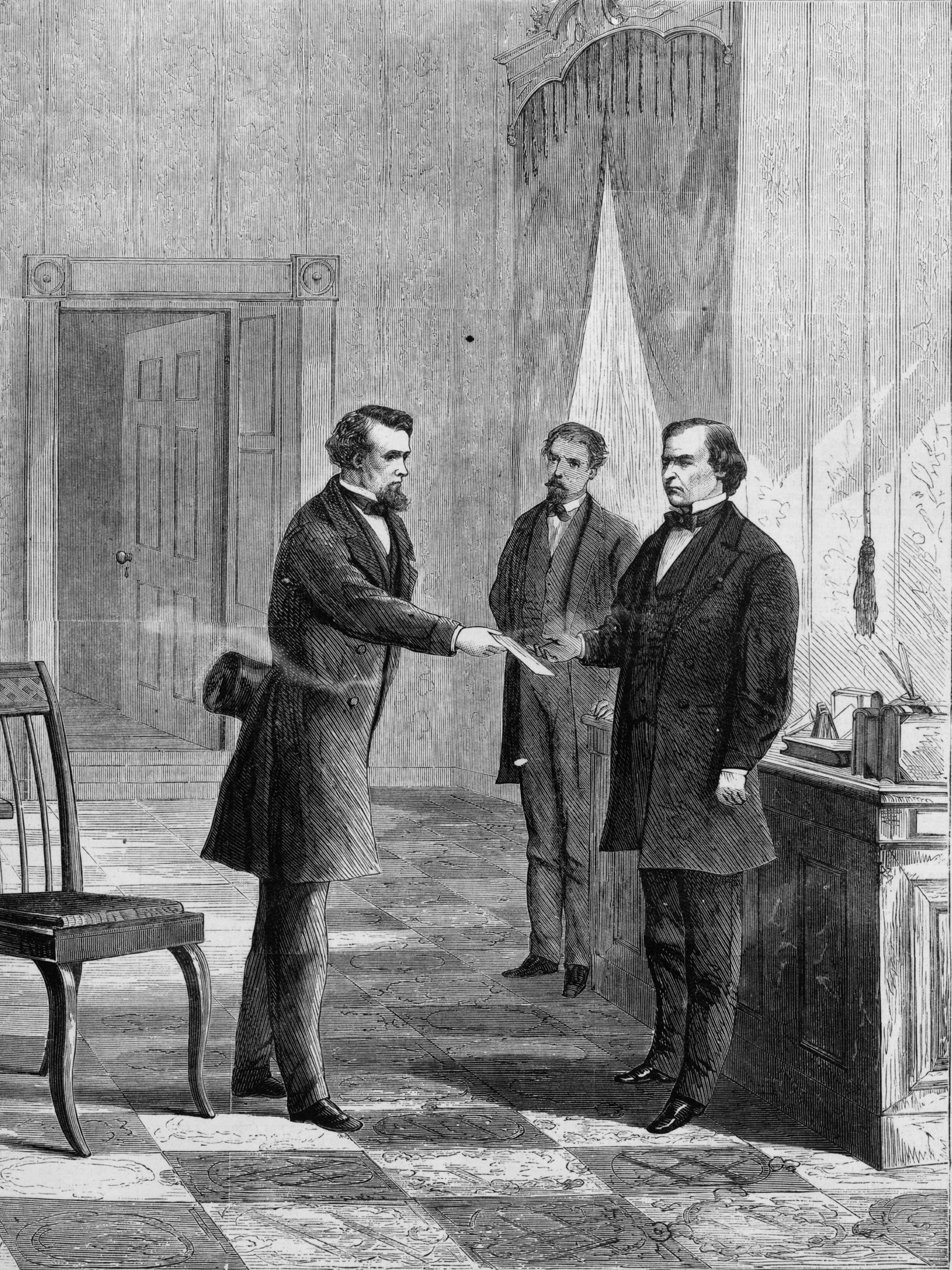
First image:Illustration of the Secretary of the United States Senate John Weiss Forney preparing the Senate's summons for President Johnson
Second image: Illustration of Sergeant at Arms of the United States Senate George T. Brown delivering the Senate's summons to Andrew Johnson at the White House on March 7, 1868
- March 6, 1868:
  - In the court of impeachment, debate on Benjamin Wade's (R– OH) qualification to serve as a juror continues until Thomas A. Hendricks (D– IN) withdraws his objection. The remaining senators are thereafter sworn in as jurors by Chief Justice Chase.
  - As a court of impeachment, the senators vote to notify the impeachment managers that they are now organized as a court of impeachment and are ready to receive them, after which the impeachment managers appear at the bar of the Senate and are thereafter invited by the Chief Justice to take their assigned seats.
  - As a court of impeachment, the Senate adopts an order to, as required by the rules and procedures adopted, issue a summons to President Johnson, returnable on March 13 at 1pm.
- March 7, 1868:
  - Sergeant at Arms of the United States Senate George T. Brown travels from the United States Capitol to the White House in order to present Johnson with his summons.
  - Chief Justice Chase sends his own summons to Johnson
- March 10, 1868: The Senate adopts rules outlining the distribution of admission tickets to the trial.
- March 12, 1868: Henry Stanbery resigns as attorney general of the United States in order to devote his full time to serving on Johnson's defense team.

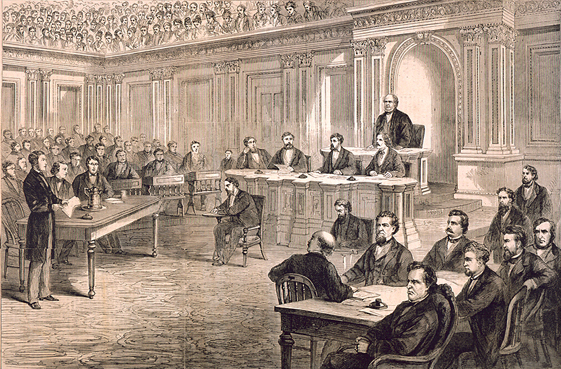
Illustration of the March 13, 1868 proceedings

- March 13, 1868: The Senate meets again as a court of impeachment on the date given for Johnson to respond to his summons. Johnson's defense team asks for forty days to collect evidence and witnesses since the prosecution had had a longer amount of time to do so, but are only granted ten days to do so.

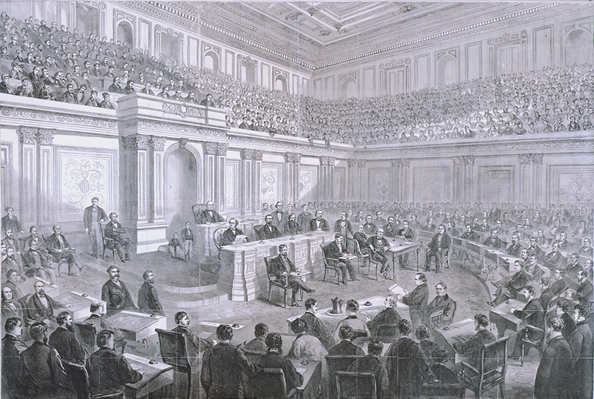
Illustration of Senate chamber as Benjamin Robbins Curtis, counsel to the president, speaks on March 23, 1868

- March 23, 1868: The Senate meets again as a court of impeachment. Senator Garrett Davis (D– KY) argues that, because not all states were represented in the Senate (due to Reconstruction), the trial could not be held and that it should therefore be adjourned. The motion is voted down. After the charges against the president are made, Henry Stanbery asks for another thirty days to assemble evidence and summon witnesses, saying that in the ten days previously granted had only been enough time to prepare the president's reply. House manager John A. Logan argues that the trial should begin immediately and that Stanbery is only trying to stall for time. Stanbery's request is turned down in a 41–12 vote.
- March 24, 1868: The Senate votes to give the defense six more days to prepare evidence.

=== Prosecution’s (House impeachment managers) presentation (March 30–April 9, 1868) ===
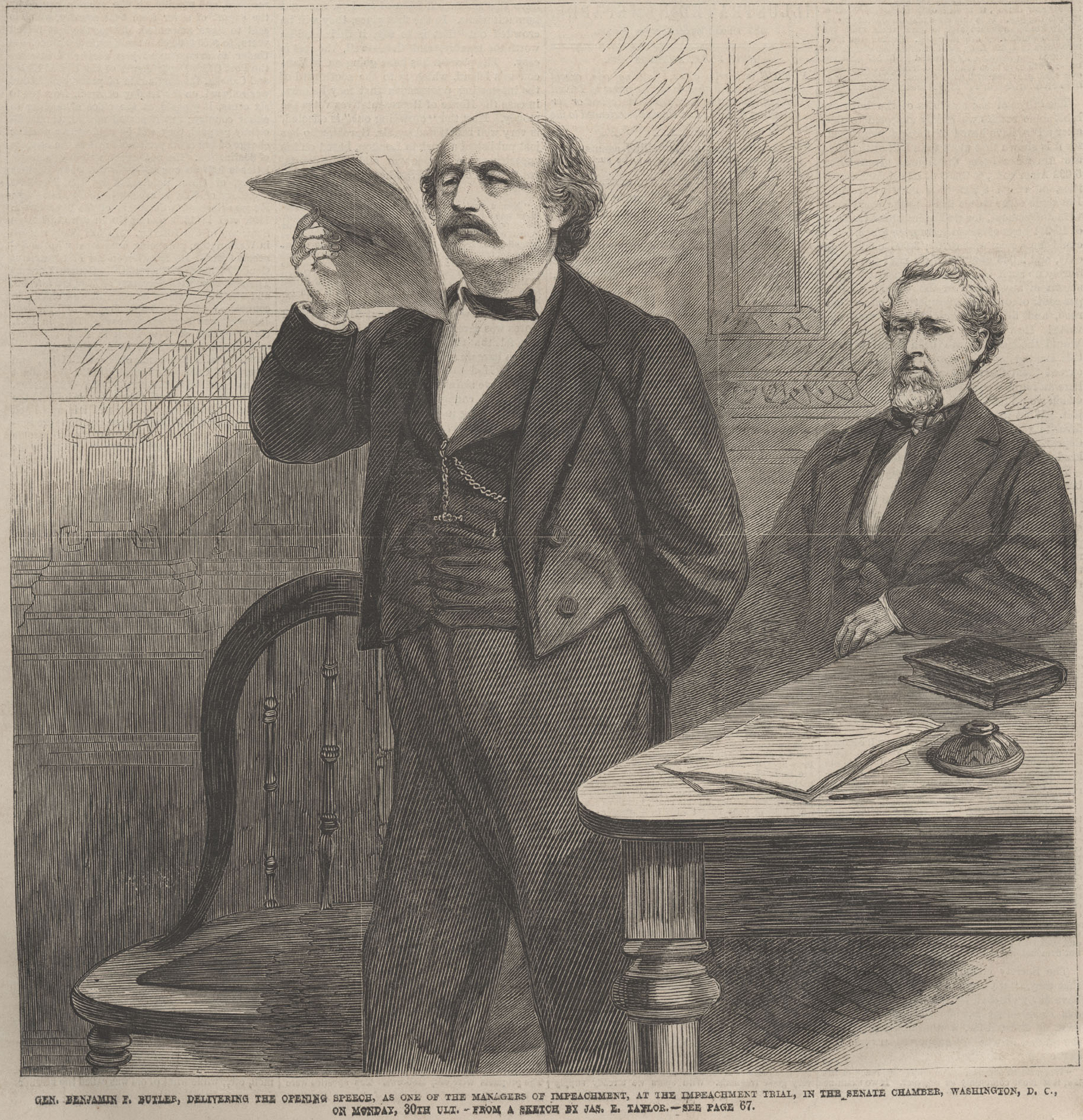
Illustration of Benjamin Butler (left) delivering the prosecution's opening remarks (March 30, 1868)

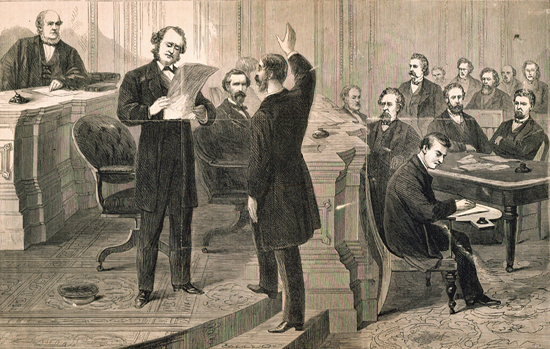
Secretary of the United States Senate John Weiss Forney administers an oath to witness William H. Emory (April 2, 1868)

- March 30: Opening remarks are delivered by Benjamin Butler.
- March 31: Testimony by Walter A. Burleigh Charles E. Creecy, Burt Van Horn, John W. Jones, William J. McDonald, and James K. Moorhead.
- April 1: Witness testimony by George W. Krasner and Samuel Wilkeson.
- April 2: Witness testimony by William E. Chandler, William H. Emory, Thomas W. Ferry, George W. Krasner, Charles A. Tinker, and George W. Wallace.
- April 3: Witness testimony by James O. Clephane, William N. Hudson, Daniel C. McEwen, William G. Moore, James B. Sheridan, Charles A. Tinker, Francis H. Smith, and Everett D. Stark.
- April 4: Witness testimony by Robert S. Chew, Charles E. Creecy, Joseph A. Dare, and L. L. Walbridge.
- April 9: Witness testimony by Foster Blodgett and M. H. Wood.

=== Defense’s presentation (April 9–20, 1868) ===
- April 10: Witness testimony by Lorenzo Thomas.
- April 11: Witness testimony by William Tecumseh Sherman.
- April 13: Witness testimony by Return J. Meigs II and William Tecumseh Sherman.
- April 15: Witness testimony by William G. Moore.
- April 16: Witness testimony by Walter Smith Cox, Richard T. Merrick, and Edward O. Perrin.
- April 17: Witness testimony by Barton Able, William W. Armstrong, George Knapp, Frederick W. Seward, Gideon Welles, and Henry F. Zeider.
- April 18: Witness testimony by Alexander Randall, Gideon Welles, and Edgart T. Welles.

=== Conclusion of trial ===
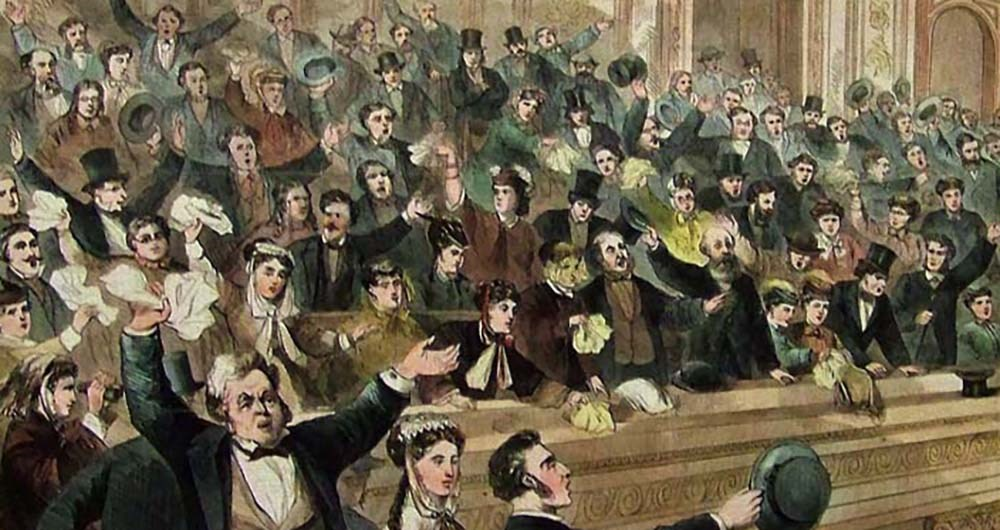
Illustration of the audience in the Senate galleries cheering at the end of impeachment manager John Bingham's May 6, 1868 speech during the closing arguments

- April 22–May 6: Final arguments (prosecution speaks first for six days, defense speaks afterwards for five days).
- May 6, 7, 11, and 12, 1868: Senate, as a court of impeachment, holds closed-door deliberations.

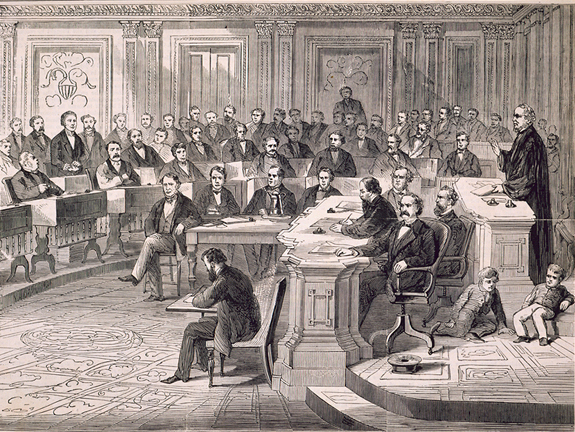
Illustration of Senator Edmund G. Ross casting his vote against conviction on the eleventh article (May 16, 1868)

- May 16, 1868:
  - The Senate, as a court of impeachment, votes to acquit on the eleventh article of impeachment, with the vote of 32–21 on conviction falling one vote short of the two-thirds majority needed to convict.
  - The Senate votes to pause trial until May 26.
  - The House votes to approve a resolution enabling the impeachment managers to investigate alleged "improper or corrupt means used to influence the determination of the Senate" and to appoint sub-committees to take testimony.
- May 25, 1868: Nehemiah G. Ordway (sergeant at arms of the United States House of Representatives) takes custody of Charles Woolley, who had failed to show up before the impeachment managers’ for their investigation into corrupt influences on the trial.
- May 26, 1868:
  - The Senate, as a court of impeachment, votes to acquit on second and third articles of impeachment, with the votes of 32–21 on conviction on each article falling one vote short of the two-thirds majority needed to convict.
  - The Senate votes to adjourn sine die, ending trial without a vote on the remaining eight articles of impeachment.

== Later developments ==
- May 26, 1868:
  - The House votes to hold Charles Woolley in contempt of Congress for refusal to answer certain questions in the impeachment managers’ investigation of potential corruption related to the impeachment trial vote.
  - The House votes 91–30 to approve a resolution presented by Benjamin Butler authorizing the House impeachment managers to continue their investigation of "improper or corrupt means used to influence the determination of the Senate".
- July 3, 1868: The final report of the impeachment managers’ investigation into alleged corrupt influences on the trial is published, failing to prove the allegations that were investigated.
- July 7, 1868:
  - Congressman Thaddeus Stevens submits to the House a resolution that would appoint a select committee to prepare additional articles of impeachment, and which lays out five specific additional articles to be considered by the select committee. After debate on this ends, further consideration is postponed on a motion by Stevens
  - Congressman Thomas Williams proposes a resolution that would, if passed, see fourteen specific new proposed articles of impeachment be adopted.
- July 25, 1868: Charles Memorial Hamilton (R– FL) submits a resolution to again impeach Johnson, instruct impeachment managers to inform the Senate, and have the impeachment managers create articles of impeachment. George S. Boutwell makes a successful motion to refer the resolution to the House Committee on the Judiciary.
- March 4, 1869: Andrew Johnson leaves the office of the presidency after his term expires.
- 1887: The Tenure of Office Act is repealed.
- 1926: The Myers v. United States decision by the Supreme Court of the United States majority opinion states in its dictum "that the Tenure of Office Act of 1867...was invalid"
