= Second impeachment inquiry into Andrew Johnson =

U.S. Congress investigation, 1868

Second impeachment inquiry against Andrew Johnson
- Accused: Andrew Johnson, 17th President of the United States
- Committee: Select Committee on Reconstruction
- Committee chair: Thaddeus Stevens
- Date: January 27– February 22, 1868 (3 weeks and 5 days)
- Outcome: Select Committee on Reconstruction recommended impeachment and reported an impeachment resolution; Johnson subsequently impeached
- Charges: Obstruction of "the due execution of the laws" (authorization of inquiry); high crimes and misdemeanors (impeachment resolution)

Congressional votes

House vote authorizing the inquiry
- Votes in favor: 99
- Votes against: 31
- Result: Approved

House Committee on Reconstruction vote on the impeachment resolution
- Votes in favor: 7
- Votes against: 2
- Result: Approved
- The House afterwards voted on February 24, 1868 to impeach Andrew Johnson

The second impeachment inquiry into Andrew Johnson was an impeachment inquiry into United States President Andrew Johnson. It followed a previous inquiry in 1867. The second inquiry, unlike the first (which was run by the House Committee on the Judiciary), was run by the House Select Committee on Reconstruction. The second inquiry ran from its authorization on January 27, 1868, until the House Select Committee on Reconstruction reported to Congress on February 22, 1868.

By early February, it appeared the prospect of an impeachment advancing was improbable. This changed when, on February 21, 1868, Johnson attempted to dismiss and replace Secretary of War Edwin Stanton in violation of the Tenure of Office Act. That day, an impeachment resolution was forwarded to the select committee. The following day, the select committee approved a slightly amended version of the resolution in a party-line 7–2 vote (with all Republican members voting in favor of the impeachment resolution and Democratic members voting against it). On February 24, 1868, the impeachment resolution was passed by the House, thereby impeaching Johnson. Johnson was later acquitted in his impeachment trial.

== Background ==
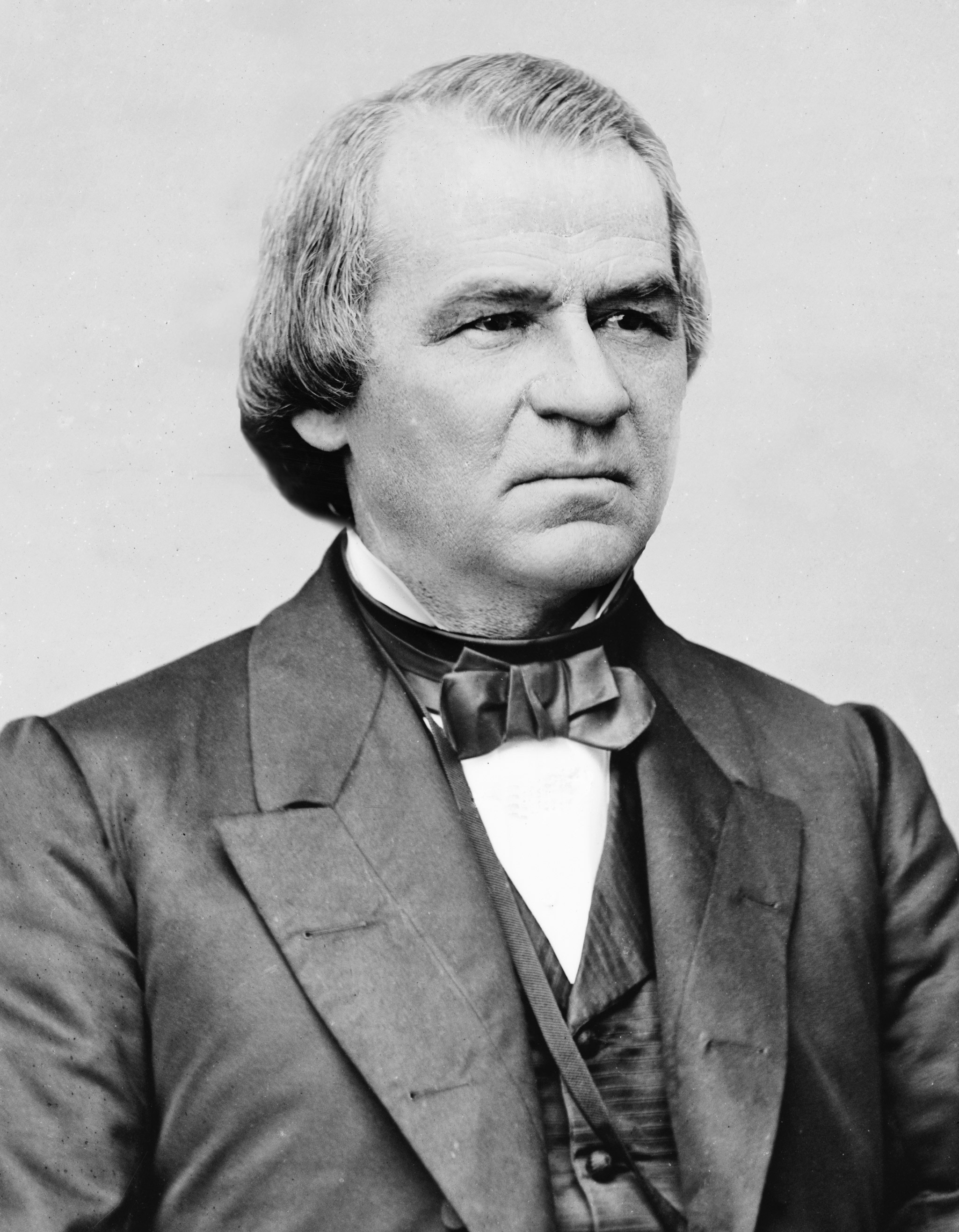
Photograph of President Johnson

Some Radical Republicans had entertained the thought of impeaching President Andrew Johnson since as early as 1866. However, the Republican Party was divided on the prospect of impeachment, with moderate Republicans in the party, who held a plurality, widely opposing it at this point. The radicals were more in favor of impeachment, as their plans for strong reform in reconstruction were greatly imperiled by Johnson.

Several attempts were made by Radical Republicans to initiate impeachment, but these were initially successfully rebuffed by moderate Republicans in party leadership. Radical Republicans continued to seek Johnson's impeachment, introducing impeachment resolutions in spite of a rule put in place for the House Republican caucus by the moderate Republican leadership in December 1866 requiring that a majority of House Republicans House Committee on the Judiciary would be required to approve any measure regarding impeachment in party caucus prior to it being considered in the House. Moderate Republicans often stifled these resolutions by referring them to committees, however. On January 7, 1867, Benjamin F. Loan, John R. Kelso, and James Mitchell Ashley each introduced three separate impeachment resolutions against Johnson. the House refused to hold debate or vote on either Loan or Kelso's resolutions. However, they did allow a vote on Ashley's impeachment-related resolution. Unlike the other two impeachment bills introduced that day (which would have outright impeached Johnson), Ashley's bill offered a specific outline of how an impeachment process would proceed, and it did not start with an immediate impeachment. Rather than going to a direct vote on impeaching the president, his resolution would instruct the Judiciary Committee to "inquire into the official conduct of Andrew Johnson", investigating what it called Johnson's "corruptly used" powers, including his political appointments, pardons for ex-Confederates, and his vetoes of legislation. The resolution passed in the House 108–39. It was seen as offering Republicans a chance to register their displeasure with Johnson, without actually formally impeaching him. This launched the first impeachment inquiry against Andrew Johnson. After the end of the 39th Congress, the first impeachment inquiry was renewed in the 40th Congress. On November 25, 1867, the House Committee on the Judiciary voted to recommend impeachment. However, when put to a full vote of the House, the House voted 57–108 against impeaching Johnson on December 7, 1867, with more Republicans voting against impeachment than for it.

== Vote authorizing the inquiry ==
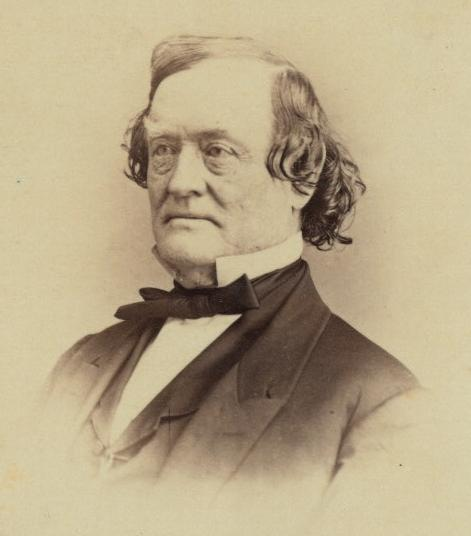
Rufus P. Spalding, who authored the resolution which authorized the second impeachment inquiry

On January 27, 1868, Rufus P. Spalding moved that the rules be suspended so that he could present a resolution resolving,

that the Committee on Reconstruction be authorized to inquire what combinations have been made or attempted to be made to obstruct the due execution of the laws, and to that end the committee have power to send for persons and papers and to examine witnesses on oath, and report to this House what action, if any, they may deem necessary, and that said committee have leave to report at any time.

The motion to allow consideration of the resolution was agreed to by a vote of 103–37, and the House voted to approve the resolution by a vote of 99–31. This launched a new inquiry into Johnson run by the Select Committee on Reconstruction.

No Democrats voted for the resolution, while the only Republicans who cast votes against it were Elihu B. Washburne and William Windom. 57 members were absent from the vote (39 Republicans, 17 Democrats, and 1 Conservative Republican). Additionally, Speaker Schuyler Colfax (a Republican) did not vote, as House rules do not require the speaker to vote during ordinary legislative proceedings, unless their vote would be decisive or if the vote is being cast by ballot.

Inquiry authorization vote
January 27, 1868	Party					Total votes
January 27, 1868	Democratic	Republican	Conservative	Conservative Republican	Independent Republican	Total votes
Yea	0	97	0	0	2	99
Nay	28	2	1	0	0	31

Comparative bar chart
Vote	Vote total
"Yea" votes	99
"Nay" votes	31
Absent/not voting	58

Votes by member
District	Member	Party	Vote
Kentucky 8	George Madison Adams	Democrat	Nay
Iowa 3	William B. Allison	Republican	Yea
Massachusetts 2	Oakes Ames	Republican	Yea
Missouri 9	George Washington Anderson	Republican	Absent
Maryland 2	Stevenson Archer	Democrat	Absent
Tennessee 6	Samuel Mayes Arnell	Republican	Yea
Nevada at-large	Delos R. Ashley	Republican	Absent
Ohio 10	James Mitchell Ashley	Republican	Yea
California 1	Samuel Beach Axtell	Democrat	Absent
New York 21	Alexander H. Bailey	Republican	Yea
Illinois 12	Jehu Baker	Republican	Absent
Massachusetts 8	John Denison Baldwin	Republican	Yea
Massachusetts 6	Nathaniel P. Banks	Republican	Yea
New York 2	Demas Barnes	Democrat	Absent
Connecticut 4	William Henry Barnum	Democrat	Nay
Michigan 1	Fernando C. Beaman	Republican	Yea
Kentucky 7	James B. Beck	Democrat	Nay
Missouri 8	John F. Benjamin	Republican	Absent
New Hampshire 3	Jacob Benton	Republican	Yea
Ohio 16	John Bingham	Republican	Yea
Maine 3	James G. Blaine	Republican	Absent
Michigan 3	Austin Blair	Republican	Yea
Massachusetts 7	George S. Boutwell	Republican	Yea
Pennsylvania 6	Benjamin Markley Boyer	Democrat	Absent
Illinois 7	Henry P. H. Bromwell	Republican	Absent
New York 8	James Brooks	Democrat	Absent
Pennsylvania 7	John Martin Broomall	Republican	Yea
Ohio 9	Ralph Pomeroy Buckland	Republican	Yea
Illinois 10	Albert G. Burr	Democrat	Nay
Massachusetts 5	Benjamin Butler	Republican	Absent
Pennsylvania 10	Henry L. Cake	Republican	Yea
Ohio 2	Samuel Fenton Cary	Independent Republican	Yea
New York 7	John Winthrop Chanler	Democrat	Nay
New York 22	John C. Churchill	Republican	Absent
Ohio 6	Reader W. Clarke	Republican	Yea
Kansas at-large	Sidney Clarke	Republican	Yea
Wisconsin 3	Amasa Cobb	Republican	Yea
Indiana 6	John Coburn	Republican	Yea
Indiana 9	Schuyler Colfax	Republican	Did not vote (speaker)^{α}
Illinois 6	Burton C. Cook	Republican	Yea
New York 13	Thomas Cornell	Republican	Yea
Pennsylvania 21	John Covode	Republican	Yea
Illinois 8	Shelby Moore Cullom	Republican	Absent
Massachusetts 10	Henry L. Dawes	Republican	Absent
Rhode Island 2	Nathan F. Dixon II	Republican	Yea
Iowa 5	Grenville M. Dodge	Republican	Yea
Minnesota 2	Ignatius L. Donnelly	Republican	Yea
Michigan 6	John F. Driggs	Republican	Yea
Ohio 17	Ephraim R. Eckley	Republican	Yea
Ohio 1	Benjamin Eggleston	Republican	Yea
New Hampshire 1	Jacob Hart Ela	Republican	Yea
Wisconsin 4	Charles A. Eldredge	Democrat	Nay
Massachusetts 1	Thomas D. Eliot	Republican	Yea
Illinois 2	John F. Farnsworth	Republican	Yea
New York 16	Orange Ferriss	Republican	Yea
Michigan 4	Thomas W. Ferry	Republican	Yea
New York 19	William C. Fields	Republican	Yea
Pennsylvania 20	Darwin Abel Finney	Republican	Absent
New York 4	John Fox	Democrat	Absent
Ohio 19	James A. Garfield	Republican	Absent
Pennsylvania 8	James Lawrence Getz	Democrat	Absent
Pennsylvania 15	Adam John Glossbrenner	Democrat	Nay
Kentucky 3	Jacob Golladay	Democrat	Nay
Missouri 4	Joseph J. Gravely	Republican	Absent
New York 15	John Augustus Griswold	Republican	Absent
Kentucky 5	Asa Grover	Democrat	Nay
New Jersey 2	Charles Haight	Democrat	Nay
New Jersey 5	George A. Halsey	Republican	Absent
Illinois 4	Abner C. Harding	Republican	Yea
Tennessee 7	Isaac Roberts Hawkins	Republican	Absent
California 2	William Higby	Republican	Yea
New Jersey 4	John Hill	Republican	Absent
Indiana 4	William S. Holman	Democrat	Nay
Massachusetts 4	Samuel Hooper	Republican	Yea
Wisconsin 2	Benjamin F. Hopkins	Republican	Yea
Connecticut 2	Julius Hotchkiss	Democrat	Nay
Iowa 6	Asahel W. Hubbard	Republican	Absent
West Virginia 1	Chester D. Hubbard	Republican	Yea
Connecticut 1	Richard D. Hubbard	Democrat	Absent
New York 17	Calvin T. Hulburd	Republican	Yea
New York 30	James M. Humphrey	Democrat	Nay
Indiana 3	Morton C. Hunter	Republican	Yea
Illinois 5	Ebon C. Ingersoll	Republican	Yea
Rhode Island 1	Thomas Jenckes	Republican	Yea
California 3	James A. Johnson	Democrat	Nay
Kentucky 6	Thomas Laurens Jones	Democrat	Nay
Illinois 1	Norman B. Judd	Republican	Yea
Indiana 5	George Washington Julian	Republican	Yea
Pennsylvania 4	William D. Kelley	Republican	Yea
New York 25	William H. Kelsey	Republican	Yea
Indiana 2	Michael C. Kerr	Democrat	Nay
New York 12	John H. Ketcham	Republican	Absent
West Virginia 2	Bethuel Kitchen	Republican	Absent
Kentucky 4	J. Proctor Knott	Democrat	Nay
Pennsylvania 16	William Henry Koontz	Republican	Yea
New York 20	Addison H. Laflin	Republican	Yea
Pennsylvania 24	George Van Eman Lawrence	Republican	Absent
Ohio 4	William Lawrence	Republican	Yea
Missouri 7	Benjamin F. Loan	Republican	Absent
New York 26	William S. Lincoln	Republican	Yea
Illinois at-large	John A. Logan	Republican	Yea
Iowa 4	William Loughridge	Republican	Absent
Maine 1	John Lynch	Republican	Yea
Oregon at-large	Rufus Mallory	Republican	Yea
Illinois 11	Samuel S. Marshall	Democrat	Absent
New York 18	James M. Marvin	Republican	Yea
Tennessee 2	Horace Maynard	Republican	Yea
Missouri 5	Joseph W. McClurg	Republican	Yea
Missouri 3	James Robinson McCormick	Democrat	Nay
Maryland 1	Hiram McCullough	Democrat	Absent
Pennsylvania 13	Ulysses Mercur	Republican	Yea
Pennsylvania 14	George Funston Miller	Republican	Absent
New Jersey 1	William Moore	Republican	Yea
Pennsylvania 22	James K. Moorhead	Republican	Yea
Ohio 13	George W. Morgan	Democrat	Absent
Pennsylvania 17	Daniel Johnson Morrell	Republican	Absent
New York 5	John Morrissey	Democrat	Absent
Tennessee 4	James Mullins	Republican	Yea
Ohio 5	William Mungen	Democrat	Nay
Pennsylvania 3	Leonard Myers	Republican	Yea
Missouri 2	Carman A. Newcomb	Republican	Yea
Indiana 1	William E. Niblack	Democrat	Nay
Delaware at-large	John A. Nicholson	Democrat	Nay
Tennessee 8	David Alexander Nunn	Republican	Absent
Pennsylvania 2	Charles O'Neill	Republican	Yea
Indiana 8	Godlove Stein Orth	Republican	Yea
Wisconsin 1	Halbert E. Paine	Republican	Yea
Maine 2	Sidney Perham	Republican	Yea
Maine 4	John A. Peters	Republican	Yea
Maryland 3	Charles E. Phelps	Conservative	Nay
Maine 5	Frederick Augustus Pike	Republican	Yea
Missouri 1	William A. Pile	Republican	Yea
Ohio 15	Tobias A. Plants	Republican	Absent
Vermont 2	Luke P. Poland	Republican	Yea
West Virginia 3	Daniel Polsley	Republican	Yea
New York 24	Theodore M. Pomeroy	Republican	Yea
Iowa 2	Hiram Price	Republican	Yea
New York 14	John V. L. Pruyn	Democrat	Nay
Pennsylvania 1	Samuel J. Randall	Democrat	Nay
Illinois 13	Green Berry Raum	Republican	Absent
New York 10	William H. Robertson	Republican	Absent
New York 3	William Erigena Robinson	Democrat	Absent
Illinois 9	Lewis Winans Ross	Democrat	Nay
Wisconsin 5	Philetus Sawyer	Republican	Yea
Ohio 3	Robert C. Schenck	Republican	Yea
Pennsylvania 19	Glenni William Scofield	Republican	Yea
New York 28	Lewis Selye	Independent Republican	Yea
Indiana 11	John P. C. Shanks	Republican	Yea
Ohio 7	Samuel Shellabarger	Republican	Absent
New Jersey 3	Charles Sitgreaves	Democrat	Absent
Vermont 3	Worthington Curtis Smith	Republican	Absent
Ohio 18	Rufus P. Spalding	Republican	Yea
Connecticut 3	Henry H. Starkweather	Republican	Yea
New Hampshire 2	Aaron Fletcher Stevens	Republican	Yea
Pennsylvania 9	Thaddeus Stevens	Republican	Absent
New York 6	Thomas E. Stewart	Conservative Republican	Absent
Tennessee 3	William Brickly Stokes	Republican	Absent
Maryland 5	Frederick Stone	Democrat	Absent
New York 1	Stephen Taber	Democrat	Nay
Nebraska at-large	John Taffe	Republican	Yea
Pennsylvania 5	Caleb Newbold Taylor	Republican	Yea
Maryland 4	Francis Thomas	Republican	Yea
Tennessee 5	John Trimble	Republican	Absent
Kentucky 1	Lawrence S. Trimble	Democrat	Nay
Michigan 5	Rowland E. Trowbridge	Republican	Yea
Massachusetts 3	Ginery Twichell	Republican	Yea
Michigan 2	Charles Upson	Republican	Yea
New York 31	Henry Van Aernam	Republican	Yea
Pennsylvania 11	Daniel Myers Van Auken	Democrat	Nay
New York 29	Burt Van Horn	Republican	Yea
Missouri 6	Robert T. Van Horn	Republican	Yea
Ohio 12	Philadelph Van Trump	Democrat	Absent
New York 11	Charles Van Wyck	Republican	Yea
New York 27	Hamilton Ward	Republican	Absent
Wisconsin 6	Cadwallader C. Washburn	Republican	Yea
Indiana 7	Henry D. Washburn	Republican	Yea
Massachusetts 9	William B. Washburn	Republican	Absent
Illinois 3	Elihu B. Washburne	Republican	Nay
Ohio 14	Martin Welker	Republican	Yea
Pennsylvania 23	Thomas Williams	Republican	Yea
Indiana 10	William Williams	Republican	Yea
Iowa 1	James F. Wilson	Republican	Yea
Ohio 11	John Thomas Wilson	Republican	Absent
Pennsylvania 18	Stephen Fowler Wilson	Republican	Absent
Minnesota 1	William Windom	Republican	Nay
New York 9	Fernando Wood	Democrat	Absent
Vermont 1	Frederick E. Woodbridge	Republican	Absent
Pennsylvania 12	George Washington Woodward	Democrat	Nay
Notes:^α Schuyler Colfax was serving as Speaker of the House. Per House rules, "the Speaker is not required to vote in ordinary legislative proceedings, except when such vote would be decisive or when the House is engaged in voting by ballot."

== Membership of House Select Committee on Reconstruction during the inquiry ==
The following is a table of the members during the second session, during which the inquiry took place.

Members of the House Select Committee on Reconstruction during the second session of the 40th United States Congress
Republican Party	Democratic Party
Thaddeus Stevens, Pennsylvania (committee chair); Fernando C. Beaman, Michigan; John Bingham, Ohio; George S. Boutwell, Massachusetts; John F. Farnsworth, Illinois; Calvin T. Hulburd, New York; Halbert E. Paine, Wisconsin	James Brooks, New York; James B. Beck, Kentucky

When the House had previously voted in December 1867 (at the end of the first impeachment inquiry) on the impeachment resolution forwarded to it by the House Committee on the Judiciary, four of these select committee members (Republicans Boutwell, Farnsworth, Stevens, and Paine) had voted in support of impeaching Johnson, while five of these select committee members (Republicans Beaman, Bingham, Hulburd and Democrats Beck and Brooks) had voted against impeachment.

== Inquiry ==
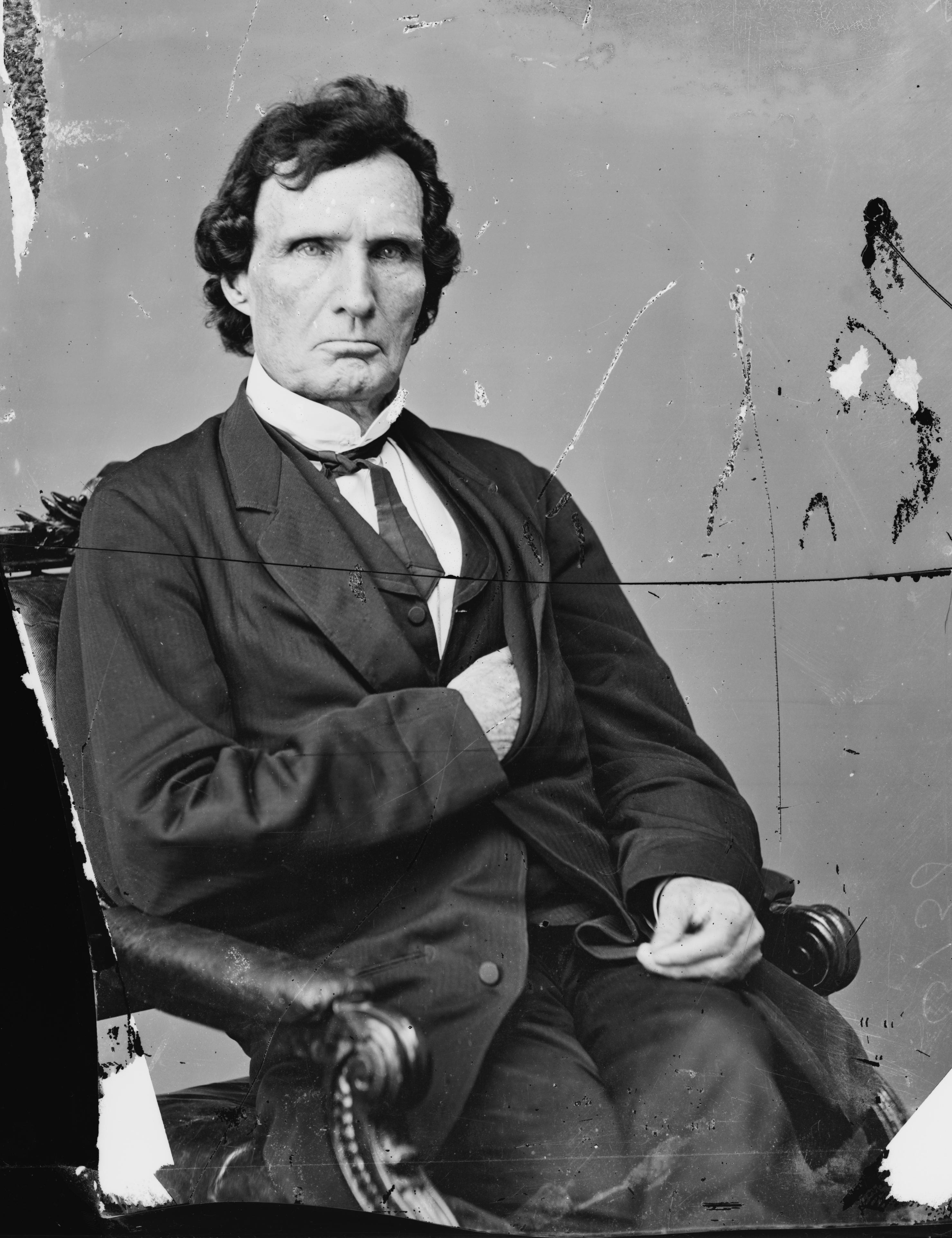
Thaddeus Stevens, chair of the Select Committee on Reconstruction

At the time of the inquiry, Radical Republican Thaddeus Stevens was chair of the House Select Committee on Reconstruction. At the time of the inquiry, Stevens was of advanced age and poor health.

The select committee also looked into correspondence between President Johnson and Ulysses S. Grant, particularly what orders Grant had been given by Johnson when Grant was his acting sectretary of war. Grant came to a committee meeting on February 8, but was not examined. In early February, heated letters between Grant and Johnson had been published in the press, adding further intrigue and fuel to the investigation.

The select committee interviewed witnesses. One witness interviewed multiple times was Jerome B. Stillson, a reporter with the New York World who had conducted regular interviews with President Johnson.

Stevens successfully persuaded the House to, on February 10, 1868, pass a resolution transferring all records from the previous impeachment inquiry and any further responsibility on impeachment away from the Committee on the Judiciary and to the Select Committee on Reconstruction.

=== Initial rejection of impeachment ===
Stevens believed that the letters between Johnson and Grant that had been published in the press proved that Johnson had attempted to convince Grant to act in violation of the Tenure of Office Act. In the morning of February 13, 1868, the select committee held a brief session. Stevens announced that he desired to test the subject of impeachment in the select committee, stating that he believed that the investigation had gone far enough and the time for action to be taken had come. Stevens introduced to the select committee a resolution to impeach the president for high crimes and misdemeanors. The resolution did not specify what high crimes and misdemeanors had been committed. Along with the resolution, he also presented the select committee with a report arguing for impeachment. The chief reason for impeaching Johnson given in the report was that Johnson had (allegedly) acted with intent to violate the Tenure of Office Act.

John Bingham (R– OH), a moderate Republican, held the balance of power on the select committee. Bingham motioned to lay on the table both the resolution, the report, and the discussion of impeachment. Stevens asked, before a vote, that the vote on the motion be recorded so that the nation would know who was in support of impeachment and who was not. In what Stevens had framed to be a de facto proxy vote on impeachment, three select committee members (Republicans Fernando C. Beaman, and John F. Farnsworth, and Stevens) voted against tabling (for impeachment) and six select committee members (Republicans Bignham, Halbert E. Paine, Calvin T. Hulburd and Democrats James B. Beck and James Brooks) voted to table (against impeachment).

The next day, pro-impeachment Republican committee members Fernando C. Beaman, George S. Boutwell, John F. Farnsworth, and Thaddeus Stevens met to discuss how to proceed towards impeachment after this setback. However, Stevens concluded that it was a lost cause. This momentarily appeared to mark the death of the prospect of impeaching Johnson and the end of the revived effort to impeach Johnson.

=== Select committee approval of an impeachment resolution ===
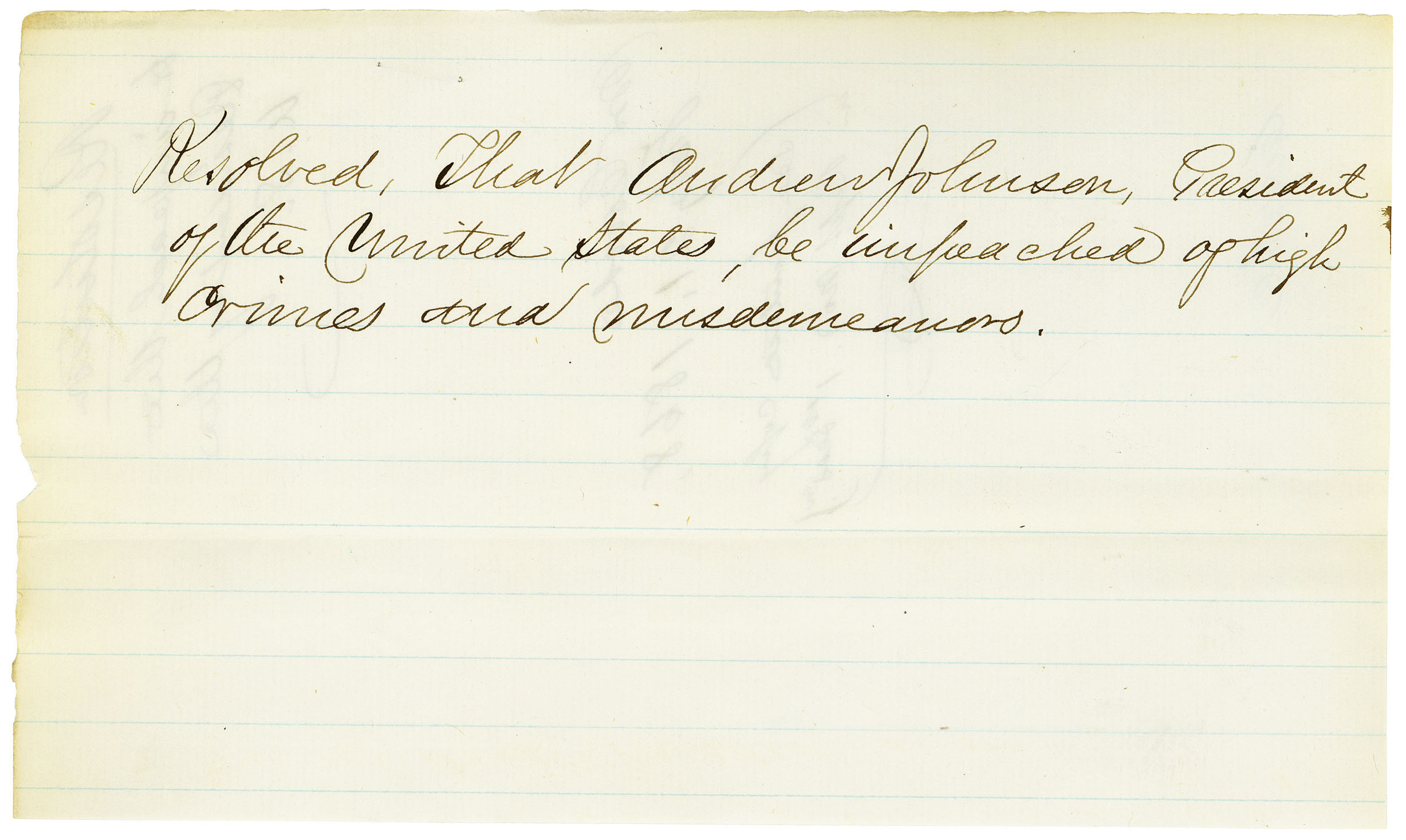
Handwritten original copy of John Covode's single sentence impeachment resolution, presented on February 21, 1868

On February 21, 1868, Johnson disregarded the Tenure of Office Act by moving to dismiss Edwin Stanton as U.S secretary of war and replace him with Lorenzo Thomas as the ad interim secretary of war. That day, Stevens submitted a resolution to the House resolving that the evidence taken on impeachment by the previous (1867) impeachment inquiry run by the Committee on the Judiciary be referred to the House Select Committee on Reconstruction, and that the select committee "have leave to report at any time", which was approved by the House. Also on February 21, a one sentence resolution to impeach Johnson, written by John Covode, was presented to the House. The resolution read, "Resolved, that Andrew Johnson, President of the United States, be impeached of high crimes and misdemeanors." George S. Boutwell motioned that the resolution be referred to the House Select Committee on Reconstruction, and it was.

An amended version of Covode's resolution was rapidly drawn up by the Select Committee on Reconstruction. In the morning February 22, 1868, by a party-line vote of 7–2, the select committee voted to refer a slightly amended version of Covode's impeachment resolution to the full House. The amended impeachment resolution read,

"Resolved, That Andrew Johnson, President of the United States, be impeached of high crimes and misdemeanors in office."

Remarks made when the full House debated the resolution indicate that the Republican members of the select committee's support for impeachment was motivated by Johnson's attempt to remove Secretary of War Stanton, which they regarded as a violation of the Tenure of Office Act.

Committee vote on impeachment resolution
February 22, 1868	Party		Total votes
February 22, 1868	Democratic	Republican	Total votes
Yea	0	7	7
Nay	2	0	2

Vote by member
District	Member	Party	Vote
Michigan 1	Fernando C. Beaman	Republican	Yea
Kentucky 7	James B. Beck	Democratic	Nay
Ohio 16	John Bingham	Republican	Yea
Massachusetts 7	George S. Boutwell	Republican	Yea
New York 8	James Brooks	Democratic	Nay
Illinois 2	John F. Farnsworth	Republican	Yea
Wisconsin 1	Halbert E. Paine	Republican	Yea
New York 17	Calvin T. Hulburd	Republican	Yea
Pennsylvania 9	Thaddeus Stevens	Republican	Yea

==== Majority report of the select committee ====
A majority report in support of impeaching Johnson for high crimes and misdemeanors was written and was signed by all of the select committee's Republican members. The dissenting Democratic members did not write a minority view, with James Brooks claiming that he had not had enough time to prepare one.

Full text of the majority report
- That in addition to the papers referred to the committee, the committee find that the President, on the 21st day of February, 1868, signed and issued a commission or letter of authority to one Lorenzo Thomas, directing and authorizing said Thomas to act as Secretary of War ad interim, and to take possession of the books, records, and papers, and other public property in the War Department, of which the following is a copy:
  ____________
  EXECUTIVE MANSION
  Washington, February 21, 1868.
  SIR: Hon. Edwin M. Stanton having been this day removed from office as Secretary for the Department of War, you are hereby authorized and empowered to act as Secretary of War ad interim, and will immediately enter upon the discharge of the duties pertaining to that office. Mr. Stanton has been instructed to transfer to you all the records, books, papers, and other public property now in his cusotody and charge.
  Respectfully yours,
  Andrew Johnson
  To Brevet Maj. Lorenzo Thomas
  Adjunct-General of the United States Army, Washington, D.C.
  Official copy respectfully furnished to Hon. Edwin M. Stanton
  L. Thomas,
  Secretary of War ad interim
  ____________
  Upon the evidence collected by the committee, which is herewith presented, and in virtue of the powers with which they have been invested by the House, they are of the opinion that Andrew Johnson, President of the United States, be impeached of high crimes and misdemeanors. They therefore recommend to the House the adoption of the accompanying resolution.
  Resolved, That Andrew Johnson, President of the United States, be impeached of high crimes and misdemeanors in office.

== Subsequent impeachment and trial ==
At 3pm on February 22, Stevens presented from the House Select Committee on Reconstruction the impeachment resolution along with the majority report. The impeachment resolution was put to a vote on February 24, 1868, three days after Johnson's dismissal of Stanton. The House of Representatives voted 126–47 (with 17 members not voting) in favor of a resolution to impeach the president for high crimes and misdemeanors, marking the first time that a president of the United States had been impeached. On February 25, the House (by a vote of 105–36) passed a resolution by George Boutwell that the House Select Committee on Reconstruction be authorized to sit during sessions of the House, ahead of proceedings that included the consideration of impeachment managers and the passage of articles of impeachment. Johnson was narrowly acquitted in his Senate trial with a 35 in favor of conviction to 19 votes in favor acquittal, one vote short of the two-thirds majority needed for a conviction.

== See also ==
- Timeline of the impeachment of Andrew Johnson
