= United States House Select Committee on Reconstruction =

- Formation: July 3, 1867
- Dissolved: March 4, 1869 (expiration of the 41st Congress)
- Type: Select committee of the U.S. House of Representatives
- Legal status: Defunct
- Purpose: "Inquire what further legislation, if any, is required respecting the acts of March 2, 1867, or other legislation on reconstruction, and to report by bill or otherwise"
- Members: 9 members (40th Congress); 13 members (41st Congress) (see section "Membership" for more information)

The House Select Committee on Reconstruction was a select committee which existed the United States House of Representatives during the 40th and 41st Congresses with a focus related to the Reconstruction Acts. The 39th Congress had had a similar joint committee called the United States Congressional Joint Committee on Reconstruction.

The select committee oversaw the second impeachment inquiry against Andrew Johnson and was the committee through which the resolution that impeached Johnson passed through and was amended before being voted on by the full House.

== Creation ==
United States House Select Committee on Reconstruction
- Long title: United States House Select Committee on Reconstruction
- Enacted by: the 40th United States Congress

Legislative history
- Introduced in the House of Representatives by Thaddeus Stevens (R–PA); Passed the United States House of Representatives on July 3, 1867

The First Reconstruction Act had been passed March 2, 1867. On July 3, 1867, the House Select Committee on Reconstruction was created when the United States House of Representatives passed a resolution by Thaddeus Stevens which read, "Resolved that a committee of nine be appointed to inquire what further legislation, if any, is required respecting the acts of March 2, 1867, or other legislation on reconstruction, and to report by bill or otherwise". In introducing the legislation, Stevens stated that he had consulted with "several gentleman" as to whether the Congress should revive the Joint Committee on Reconstruction that had existed in the previous Congress, and stated that senators and Congressman John Bingham had all agreed that it was more convenient for each body of the United States Congress to appoint its own separate committees.

== Actions ==
=== 40th Congress ===
The initial nine-member form of the select committee existed from its creation until the third session of the 40th Congress came to a close on March 2, 1869. Speaker Schuyler Colfax appointed the select committee's initial nine members on July 5, 1867.

==== Legislative actions ====
On July 8, 1867, Select Committee Chairman Thaddeus Stevens reported from the select committee the bill H.R. 123. This resolution (part of the Reconstruction Acts) was a supplementary act to the previous two Reconstruction Acts bills that had been passed by Congress on 2 May 1867 and 23 March 1867. The resolution was not voted on by the House at that time out of courtesy to the committee's Democratic minority, as Stevenson apologized for not having understood that James Brooks had desired to given the opportunity to prepare a committee minority report on the resolution. The resolution was recommitted (sent back to the select committee) on July 9, 1867. An amended version of the bill was presented to the House from the select committee by Stevens on July 12, 1867, and was passed by the House. The Senate passed it on July 13. It was adopted over President Andrew Johnson's veto on July 19, 1867.

On July 12, 1867, the House approved a resolution presented by George Washington Julian instructing the select committee to report a bill that would declare, "forfeited to the United States all lands granted by the Congress in the year 1856 and to the States of the south to aid the reconstruction of railroads, which grants have no expired by limitation."

==== Investigative actions ====
During the second session of the 40th Congress, the select committee submitted three reports to the House.

In January and February 1868, the select committee oversaw the second impeachment inquiry against Andrew Johnson. On February 21, 1868, a one sentence resolution to impeach President Johnson, written by John Covode (reading, "Resolved, that Andrew Johnson, President of the United States, be impeached of high crimes and misdemeanors.") was referred to the select committee. On February 22, 1868, Select Committee Chairman Stevens presented a report from the Select Committee opining that Johnson should be impeached for high crimes and misdemeanors, along with a slightly amended version of Covode's impeachment resolution (which read, "Resolved, That Andrew Johnson, President of the United States, be impeached of high crimes and misdemeanors in office.") On February 28, 1868, the full house passed this resolution, thereby impeaching president Johnson.

On December 3, 1868 (the opening day of the third session of the 40th Congress), the select committee was directed by the House to investigate the condition of public affairs in the formerly Confederate states of Georgia, Mississippi, Texas, and Virginia. Roughly two weeks after that, the House gave the select committee authorization to issue summons for, "such witnesses to appear before them as the committee may deem necessary to enable them to report fully on the state of affairs in Georgia, Mississippi, Virginia, and Texas." Later in that session, the select committee printed the testimony they obtained on the conditions of affairs in those states.

On December 14, 1868, the House directed the select committee to investigate, "Ku Klux outrages practiced upon peaceable and law-abiding citizens of the United States in the State of Tennessee and elsewhere."

On January 28, 1869, the House approved a resolution which expanded the mandate of the select committee further.

=== 41st Congress ===
Days into the 41st Congress, on March 9, 1868, the House voted 109–42 to approve a resolution offered by George S. Boutwell to reconstitute its Select Committee on Reconstruction with thirteen members and have it operate under the same rules and regulations as it had in the previous Congress. The resolution also ordered for the reconstituted select committee to be referred possession of all of the documents and resolutions that had been before the select committee of the 40th Congress. Speaker Theodore M. Pomeroy appointed thirteen members on March 15, 1869. On March 20, 1869, the Senate created a similar committee called the United States Senate Select Committee on the Removal of Political Disabilities.

The select committee issued its final report on February 20, 1871, and dissolved on the last day of session of the 41st Congress (March 2, 1871).

== Membership ==
=== First session of the 40th Congress ===
The following is a table of the initial members, appointed by Speaker Schuyler Colfax during the first session of the 40th Congress on July 5, 1867.

Members of the House Select Committee on Reconstruction during the first session of the 40th United States Congress
Republican Party	Democratic Party
Thadeus Stevens, Pennsylvania (committee chair); Fernando C. Beaman, Michigan; John Bingham, Ohio; George S. Boutwell, Massachusetts; John F. Farnsworth, Illinois; Calvin T. Hulburd, New York; Halbert E. Paine, Wisconsin; Frederick A. Pike, Maine	James Brooks, New York

=== Second session of the 40th Congress ===
Republican Frederick A. Pike departed the committee and was replaced by Democrat James B. Beck. The following is a table of the members during the second session of the 40th Congress, beginning December 3, 1867.

Members of the House Select Committee on Reconstruction during the second session of the 40th United States Congress
Republican Party	Democratic Party
Thadeus Stevens, Pennsylvania (committee chair); Fernando C. Beaman, Michigan; John Bingham, Ohio; George S. Boutwell, Massachusetts; John F. Farnsworth, Illinois; Calvin T. Hulburd, New York; Halbert E. Paine, Wisconsin	James Brooks, New York; James B. Beck, Kentucky

=== Third session of the 40th Congress ===
Former chair Thaddeus Stevens had died during the recess between sessions and was replaced as chair by George S. Boutwell, while Benjamin White Norris filled the spot on the committee left vacant by Stevens' death. The following is a table of the members during the third session of the 40th Congress, beginning December 9, 1868.

Members of the House Select Committee on Reconstruction during the third session of the 40th United States Congress
Republican Party	Democratic Party
George S. Boutwell, Massachusetts (committee chair); Fernando C. Beaman, Michigan; John Bingham, Ohio; John F. Farnsworth, Illinois; Calvin T. Hulburd, New York; Benjamin White Norris, Alabama; Halbert E. Paine, Wisconsin	James Brooks, New York; James B. Beck, Kentucky

=== First session of the 41st Congress ===
The select committee's size was increased from nine members to thirteen members for the 41st Congress. Four members who had served on the select committee during the third session of the 40th Congress returned (Republicans Fernando C. Beaman, John F. Farnsworth, Halbert E. Paine and Democrat James B. Beck). Five individuals that had been members of the select committee during the third session of the 40th Congress the who did not return were Republicans (George S. Boutwell, John Bingham, Calvin T. Hulbard, Benjamin White Norris, and Democrat James Brooks). There were nine new members of the select committee (Republicans Benjamin Butler George Washington Julian, William Lawrence, William H. Upson, Hamilton Ward, Benjamin Franklin Whittemore, and Democrats George W. Borgan, Fernando Wood, and George Washington Woodward). New member Benjamin Butler became the select committee's chair, replacing George S. Boutwell, who had not returned to the select committee.

The following is a table of the members during the first session of the 41st Congress, having been appointed by Speaker Theodore M. Pomeroy on March 15, 1869.

Members of the House Select Committee on Reconstruction during the first session of the 41st United States Congress
Republican Party	Democratic Party
Benjamin Butler, Massachusetts (committee chair); Fernando C. Beaman, Michigan; John F. Farnsworth, Illinois; George Washington Julian, Indiana; William Lawrence; Halbert E. Paine, Wisconsin; William H. Upson, Ohio; Hamilton Ward, New York; Benjamin Franklin Whittemore, South Carolina	James B. Beck, Kentucky; George W. Morgan, Ohio; Fernando Wood, New York; George Washington Woodward, Pennsylvania

=== Second and third sessions of the 41st Congress ===
Between the first and second sessions of the 41st Congress, Republican members William H. Upson and Benjamin Franklin Whittemore departed the committee and were replaced by fellow Republicans Oliver H. Dockery and George C. McKee. No changes of membership occurred between the second and third sessions of the 41st Congress. The following is a table of the members during the second and third sessions of the 41st Congress, beginning December 6, 1869 and in December 1870, respectively.

Members of the House Select Committee on Reconstruction during the second and third sessions of the 41st United States Congress
Republican Party	Democratic Party
Benjamin Butler, Massachusetts (committee chair); Fernando C. Beaman, Michigan; Oliver H. Dockery, North Carolina; John F. Farnsworth, Illinois; George Washington Julian, Indiana; William Lawrence; George C. McKee, Mississippi; Halbert E. Paine, Wisconsin; Charles H. Porter; William H. Upson, Ohio; Hamilton Ward, New York	James B. Beck, Kentucky; George W. Morgan, Ohio; Fernando Wood, New York; George Washington Woodward, Pennsylvania

== Aftermath ==
In the 42nd Congress, a new select committee called the United States House Select Committee to Inquire into the Condition of the Late Insurrectionary States was created, and shortly thereafter turned into a joint committee (the United States Congressional Joint Committee to Inquire into the Condition of Affairs in the Late Insurrectionary States). It assumed the functions that had belonged to the House Select Committee on Reconstruction during the previous two Congresses.
