= Rufus P. Spalding =

American judge (1798–1886)

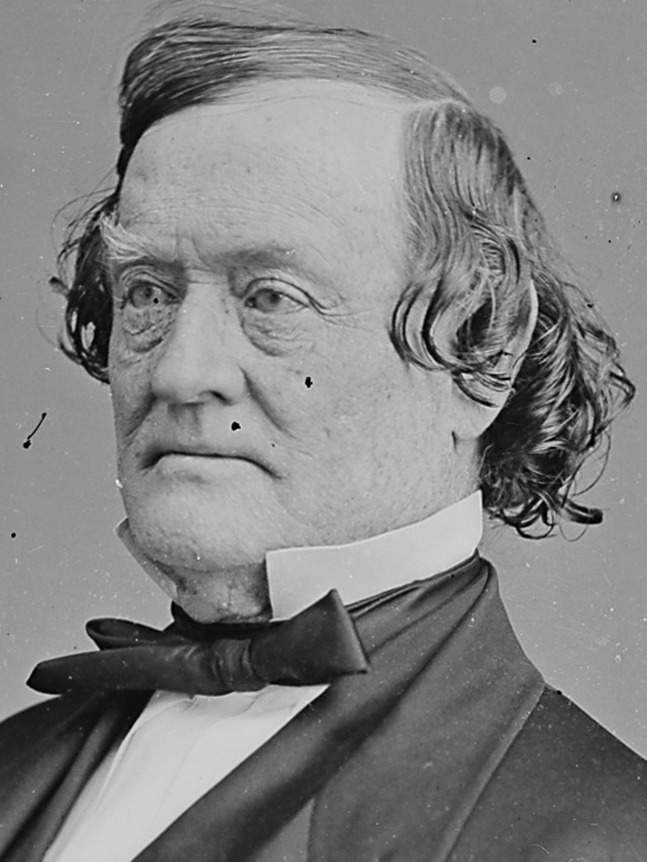

Member of the U.S. House of Representatives from Ohio's 18th district
- In office March 4, 1863 – March 3, 1869
- Preceded by: Sidney Edgerton
- Succeeded by: William H. Upson

Justice of the Ohio Supreme Court
- In office February 20, 1849 – February 9, 1852
- Preceded by: Nathaniel C. Reed
- Succeeded by: Thomas Welles Bartley

Member of the Ohio House of Representatives
- In office 1839-1842

Personal details
- Born: Rufus Paine Spalding; May 3, 1798 West Tisbury, Massachusetts, U.S.
- Died: August 29, 1886 (aged 88) Cleveland, Ohio, U.S.
- Resting place: Lake View Cemetery
- Party: Democratic; Free Soil; Republican
- Spouses: Lucretia A Swift (m. 1822, died) Nancy Pierson (m. 1859)
- Relations: William R. Day (grandson)
- Children: 3, (Note: Sources differ but they had at least three children.) including Zephaniah Swift Spalding
- Profession: Politician; lawyer; judge

Rufus Paine Spalding (May 3, 1798 – August 29, 1886) was a nineteenth-century politician, lawyer and judge from Ohio. From 1863 to 1869, he served three terms in the U.S. House of Representatives. He also served as a justice of the Ohio Supreme Court from 1849 through 1852 and as a member of the Ohio House of Representatives from 1839 through 1842.

== Early life ==
Born in West Tisbury, Massachusetts, Spalding graduated from Yale College in 1817. After graduating, Spalding began his study of law as an apprentice under Zephaniah Swift, the father of his future wife Lucretia A. Swift. Swift was a prominent lawyer and judge from Connecticut, and the author of several legal "digests."

During his apprenticeship, Swift was the sitting Chief Justice of the Connecticut Supreme Court. In December 1819, Spalding left New England and moved to Little Rock, Arkansas. In Little Rock, Spalding established a law practice with Samuel Dinsmoore. Spalding and Dinsmoore practiced law together for a year and a half before Spalding dissolved the partnership and left the state. In 1821 Spalding moved to Warren, Ohio, to continue practicing. He moved to Ravenna, Ohio, in 1835 and, once again, commenced the practice of law.

== Ohio House of Representatives ==
In 1839, Spalding was elected to the Ohio House of Representatives as a Democrat. During his first term, Spalding's most notable accomplishment was overseeing the creation of Summit County, Ohio. Lawmakers in the General Assembly had proposed legislation to form a new county six years before Spalding was elected, but the bill failed to gain the necessary support. Under the proposed plan, land from the western townships of Portage County, eastern townships of Medina County, and northern townships of Stark County was to be taken in order to create the new county. Republican Representatives from these counties opposed the legislation for political reasons. Following the 1839 election, the Democrats, led by Spalding, and the Whigs gained enough seats to form a coalition and pass bill. Following the creation of Summit County, Spalding moved from Ravenna to Akron, Ohio.

Spalding was reelected to the Ohio House of Representatives in 1841, and served as Speaker of the House for one term. During his second term, Spalding oversaw the defeat of a bill which would have repudiated the state debt. During the 1840s Ohio suffered from an inflationary boom. As a result, the state now faced repayment of the debt with dollars that were worth more than the money they had been previously borrowed. A popular solution at the time was to repudiate the debt. Spalding opposed the idea. He believed that if Ohio repudiated its debt and chose not to repay its creditors, it would make it harder for the state to borrow money in the future. Proponents of the debt repudiation bill continued to push for its passage. It was not until John Brough, the State Auditor, joined Spalding in opposing the scheme, that the bill died.

== Judicial career ==
Spalding served as an Associate Justice of the Ohio Supreme Court from 1849 to 1852.

== Free-Soil Party ==
As a Representative in the General Assembly, and while serving as a judge, Spalding was a member of the Democratic party, but throughout the 1840s he found his personal views increasingly at odds with the Party's position on slavery. While Spalding never advocated the interference of slavery in states in which it already existed, he believed that under no circumstances should slavery be extended into the territories. In 1847, Spalding delivered a speech in Akron in which he argued that "if the evil of slavery had been restricted, as it should have been, to the thirteen original states, self interest might have led to the extinction of practice long before now." Spalding's advocacy against the spread of slavery drew the attention of the Free Soil Party. In 1849, local Free Soil leaders invited Spalding, who was still a Democrat, to give a speech at a party convention in Cleveland. In his speech, Spalding maintained that he was still a strict party man, but his speech was particularly critical of southern democrats. Spalding continued to argue that slavery should not be extended into the American territories and closed his remarks with a call to Free-Soilers to "stand fast" in their beliefs. In 1850, Spalding left the Democratic Party for the Free Soil Party. His primary motivation behind this decision was the Party's support of the Fugitive Slave Act of 1850, which he felt made the Democrats a "pro-slavery" party.

In 1852, the Free-Soil party held their national convention in Pittsburgh to select a presidential candidate. The party selected Spalding as one of the thirteen delegates chosen to attend the convention. The Free-Soilers went to their convention with two potential presidential candidates in Salmon Chase, and John P. Hale. Spalding and Chase were longtime associates, and both Ohioans. Two years before, Spalding and Chase had toured Toledo and Cleveland speaking out against the Fugitive Slave Act. Despite his prior relationship Chase, Spalding chose to support Hale, at the convention. During the campaign, Spalding toured much of Northeast Ohio giving speeches in support of Hale. His efforts were unsuccessful however, and Hale failed to carry a single state in the election.

Despite being active in politics, Spalding also maintained a private law practice. As an outspoken opponent of slavery, Spalding began to rally other Cleveland attorneys against southern slaveholders who came to the North looking to claim fugitive slaves. In 1859, Spalding represented Underground Railroad supporter Simon Bushnell in Ex Parte Bushnell. At trial, a jury convicted Bushnell of violating Article 4 Section 2 of the Constitution, and the Fugitive Slave Act because Bushnell obstructed a slaver-owner from capturing a fugitive slave name John. At trial, Spalding argued that the Fugitive Slave laws were unconstitutional. Despite Spalding's efforts, Bushnell was found guilty and sentenced to serve sixty days in the Cuyahoga County jail, and to pay a fine of six hundred dollars.

Two years later, Spalding would again attempt to overturn the Fugitive Slave. In 1861, Spalding represented a runaway slave named Lucy who was captured in Cleveland. At trial, Spalding once again argued that enforcement of the Fugitive Slave laws was both unconstitutional, as well as immoral. Ultimately, Spalding was unsuccessful, and Lucy was returned to her owner. Some good did result from Spalding's efforts. Lucy was the last slave to be sent back to the South from Ohio under the Fugitive Slave laws.

== Early Republican Party ==
Spalding was a major figure in the creation of the Ohio Republican Party. Following the passage of the Kansas-Nebraska act in 1854, anti-slavery politicians from various parties met in the Town Street Methodist Episcopal Church in Columbus, Ohio, to form what became the Fusion Party. At the convention, Spalding chaired the Resolutions Committee. The committee drafted six resolutions, including one that pledged that the party would render inoperative the portion of the Kansas-Nebraska act which abolished freedom in the territory withdrawn from the Missouri Compromise of 1820. The Fusion Party would later become the Ohio Republican Party.

The first Republican presidential convention was held in 1856 in Philadelphia. Spalding was selected to be the delegate at large from Ohio. In addition to his position as a delegate, Spalding also served as the manager of John McLean's campaign for the Presidential nomination. The night prior to the commencement of the convention Spalding wrote to McLean, expressing his optimism regarding his chances of beating the other major candidate, John C. Frémont. The following day, shortly before the voting process was set to begin, Spalding shocked McLean supporters by announcing to the delegates that McLean was withdrawing his name for consideration of the nomination.

== United States House of Representatives ==
In 1862, the Republican Party nominated Spalding to represent Ohio's 18th congressional district. Spalding won the election and was sworn in as a member of the Thirty-Eight Congress. During his first term, Spalding was appointed to the Standing Committee on Naval Affairs, the Committee on Revolutionary Pensions, and served as the chairman on the Select Committee on Bankruptcy Law.

Spalding was a great supporter of President Lincoln. Spalding made his commitment to the President known during his early years in Congress by introducing an act that repealed the fugitive slave laws of 1793 and 1850. Following the President's assassination, Spalding was one of twenty-two representatives selected to meet Lincoln's remains at his funeral train in Springfield, Illinois.

In 1864, Spalding was re-elected. During his second term he was made a member of the Standing Committee on Appropriations and retained his Chairmanship on the Bankruptcy Committee. Following the end of the Civil War, Spalding took a leading role in the Congressional debates over Reconstruction. On January 22, 1864, Spalding delivered a speech to the Congress on the subject of confiscation of rebel property. Most of the measures suggested by Spalding were adopted into the Reconstruction Acts.

On January 27, 1868, Spalding introduced a successful resolution to have the House Select Committee on Reconstruction conduct an impeachment inquiry into president Andrew Johnson. In late February, shortly after the committee reached a recommendation of impeachment, the House of Representatives voted to impeach Johnson.

== Personal life ==
He married Lucretia A. Swift on October 1, 1822. they had at least three children; Charles G., Elizabeth B. and Col. Zephaniah Swift Spalding. Lucretia died between 1850 and 1858. His second wife was Nancy Pierson whom he betrothed on January 11, 1859. His daughter Emily's son William R. Day was U.S. Secretary of State and associate justice of the U.S. Supreme Court.

== Death ==
Spalding died in Cleveland, Ohio, on August 29, 1886, and was interred in Lake View Cemetery in Cleveland.

== Notes ==
Legal offices
Preceded by Nathaniel C. Reed	Associate Justice of the Ohio Supreme Court; March, 1849 – February, 1852	Succeeded by Thomas W. Bartley
U.S. House of Representatives
Preceded by Sidney Edgerton	Member of the U.S. House of Representatives from Ohio's 18th congressional district March 4, 1863 – March 3, 1869	Succeeded by William H. Upson
Ohio House of Representatives
Preceded by Seabury Ford	Speaker of the House; 1841-1842	Succeeded by John Chaney
