= Halbert E. Paine =

Union Army general and American politician (1826–1905)

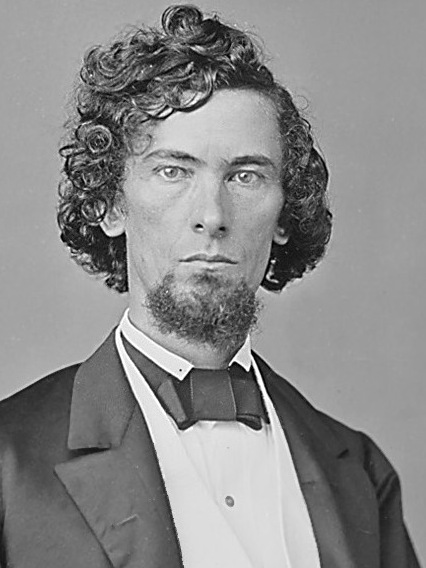

21st United States Commissioner of Patents
- In office November 1, 1878 – May 1, 1880
- Appointed by: Rutherford B. Hayes
- Preceded by: Ellis Spear
- Succeeded by: Edgar M. Marble

Member of the U.S. House of Representatives from Wisconsin's 1st district
- In office March 4, 1865 – March 3, 1871
- Preceded by: James S. Brown
- Succeeded by: Alexander Mitchell

Personal details
- Born: February 4, 1826 Chardon, Ohio, U.S.
- Died: April 14, 1905 (aged 79) Washington, D.C., U.S.
- Resting place: Arlington National Cemetery
- Party: Republican
- Spouse: Eliza Leaworthy Brigham (m. 1850; died 1905)
- Children: Eliza Brigham (Ladd); (b. 1852; died 1922)
- Relatives: Eleazar A. Paine (cousin)

Military service
- Allegiance: United States
- Branch/service: United States Volunteers; Union Army
- Years of service: 1861–1865
- Rank: Brig. General, USV; Brevet Major General, USV
- Commands: 4th Reg. Wis. Vol. Infantry
- Battles/wars: American Civil War

Halbert Eleazer Paine (February 4, 1826 – April 14, 1905) was an American lawyer, Republican politician, and Wisconsin pioneer. He served as the 21st United States Commissioner of Patents (1878–1880), appointed by President Rutherford B. Hayes. He earlier served three terms in the U.S. House of Representatives, representing Wisconsin's 1st congressional district from 1865 to 1871. Before his political career, Paine served as a Union Army general in the western theater of the American Civil War.

His first cousin, Eleazar A. Paine, was also a Union Army general in the Civil War.

== Biography ==
Paine was born in Chardon, Ohio, in February 1826. After attending the common schools, Paine graduated from Western Reserve College in 1845. He moved to Mississippi for a year to teach school but returned to Cleveland to read the law. In 1848 he passed the bar exam and established a practice. He married and started a family.

In 1857, Paine took his family to Milwaukee, Wisconsin, where he continued his legal career. Beginning 1859, his law partner was Carl Schurz, though, with Paine's encouragement, Schurz took more of an interest in politics and public speaking than law.

== American Civil War ==
With the outbreak of the Civil War, Paine entered the Union army as the colonel of the 4th Wisconsin Infantry Regiment. On April 9, 1863, President Abraham Lincoln appointed Paine brigadier general of volunteers, to rank from March 13, 1863. The President had nominated Paine for the promotion on March 12, 1863, and the U.S. Senate had confirmed the appointment on March 13, 1863.

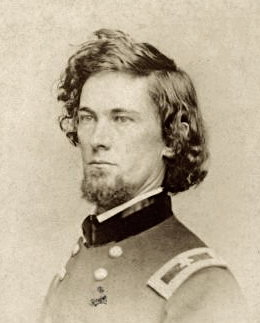
Paine after his promotion to Brigadier General.

Paine led widespread actions in the Lower Mississippi, which took him into Louisiana. These included involvement in the Vicksburg campaign, the capture of New Orleans, the Battle of Baton Rouge, and the Bayou Teche offensive. He also coordinated anti-guerrilla operations in southern Louisiana and Mississippi. In late-September 1862, Paine assumed command of the Camp Parapet, a fortification about ten miles north of New Orleans under overall command of Brigadier General Thomas W. Sherman, who was in command of New Orleans defenses.

With the Third Division of the Army of the Gulf, he took part in an assault on Priest Gap during the siege and Battle of Port Hudson in Louisiana. He suffered a wound that required amputation of his leg. After his recovery, Paine commanded troops in the defense of Washington, D.C., during Jubal A. Early's raid in 1864. He resigned from the army on May 15, 1865, due to his election to the U.S. House of Representatives.

On December 11, 1866, President Andrew Johnson nominated Paine for appointment to the brevet grade of major general of volunteers, to rank from March 13, 1865. The U.S. Senate confirmed the appointment on February 6, 1867.

== Politics ==
Paine, a Republican, was elected to the 39th, 40th and 41st Congress from Wisconsin's 1st congressional district, serving from March 4, 1865, till March 3, 1871. He was a delegate to the 1866 National Union Convention in Philadelphia, which was attempting to encourage support for President Andrew Johnson in advance of the mid-term elections. Some attendees hoped to found a new political party, but this did not take place.

In 1869, Paine championed the passage of a bill that provided for taking meteorological observations in the interior of the continent. He served as chairman of the Committee on Militia (Fortieth Congress), and the Committee on Elections (Forty-first Congress). After the expiration of his third term in Congress, he retired from politics and chose not to accept renomination.

== Law ==
After serving in Congress, Paine practiced law in Washington, D.C., for several years, having established residency there. In 1879, he was appointed by President Rutherford B. Hayes as the United States Commissioner of Patents, serving in that post for two years. While there, he promoted adoption by Federal agencies of useful innovations, such as typewriters.

== Cases and memoir ==
In later years, Paine published two accounts of contested elections in which he had represented a candidate: Contested Election, Territory of Utah: George R. Maxwell V. George Q. Cannon (1888), and Contested Election, United States Senate: William H. Clagett v. Frederick T. Dubois, based on his argument before the Committee on Privileges and Elections. These were related to his work in Washington, DC.

In addition, he wrote a memoir of his Civil War years, reflecting on the complexities of its issues as a man of the North. Entitled A Wisconsin Yankee in Confederate Bayou Country: The Civil War Reminiscences of a Union General, the memoir was published for the first time in 2009, in an annotated edition edited by historian Samuel C. Hyde, Jr. It is described as "less celebration of the grand cause and greater analysis of the motives for his actions—and their inherent contradictions."

Paine died April 14, 1905, in Washington, D.C. He was buried in Arlington National Cemetery.

== Works ==
- Halbert E. Paine, Contested Election, Territory of Utah: George R. Maxwell V. George Q. Cannon, (1888)
- Contested Election, United States Senate: William H. Clagett v. Frederick T. Dubois : before the Committee on Privileges and Elections : argument of Halbert E. Paine, counsel for contestee, Gibson Brothers (1891)
- A Wisconsin Yankee in Confederate Bayou Country: The Civil War Reminiscences of a Union General, ed. by Samuel C. Hyde, Jr., Louisiana State University Press, 2009

== See also ==
- List of American Civil War generals (Union)

Political offices
Preceded by Ellis Spear	United States Commissioner of Patents; November 1, 1878 – May 1, 1880	Succeeded by Edgar M. Marble
U.S. House of Representatives
Preceded by James S. Brown	Member of the U.S. House of Representatives from Wisconsin's 1st congressional district March 4, 1865 – March 3, 1871	Succeeded by Alexander Mitchell
