= John Covode =

American politician (1808–1871)

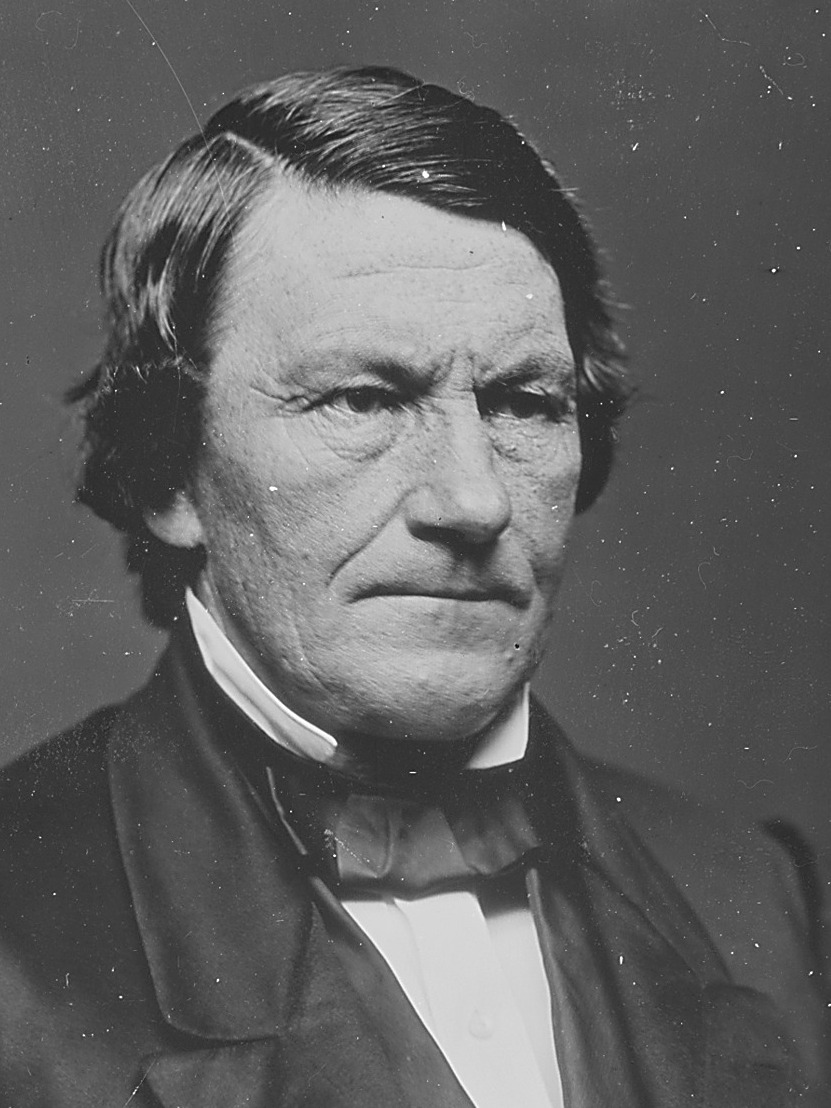

Member of the U.S. House of Representatives from Pennsylvania
- In office February 9, 1870 – January 11, 1871
- Preceded by: Vacant
- Succeeded by: Henry Donnel Foster
- Constituency: 21st district
- In office March 4, 1867 – March 3, 1869
- Preceded by: John Littleton Dawson
- Succeeded by: Vacant
- Constituency: 21st district
- In office March 4, 1855 – March 3, 1863
- Preceded by: Augustus Drum
- Succeeded by: Glenni William Scofield
- Constituency: 19th district

Personal details
- Born: March 17, 1808 West Fairfield, Pennsylvania
- Died: January 11, 1871 (aged 62)
- Party: Whig; Republican (after 1854)
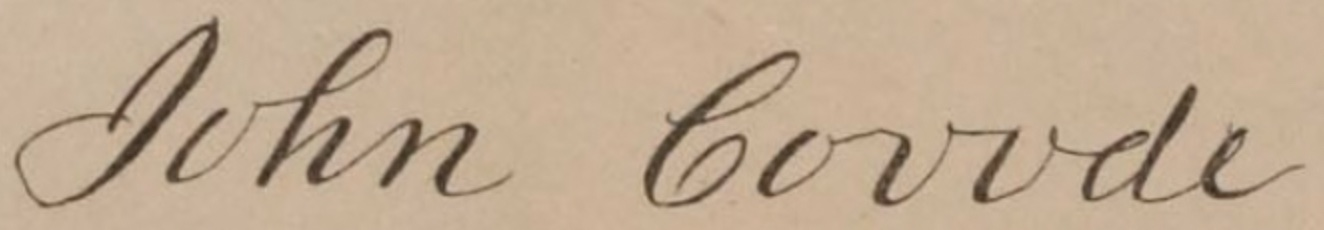
- Signature

John Covode (March 17, 1808 – January 11, 1871) was an American businessman and abolitionist politician. He served three terms in the United States House of Representatives from Pennsylvania.

== Early life ==
Covode was born in Fairfield Township, Westmoreland County, Pennsylvania. He worked for several years on his father's farm, served an apprenticeship to a blacksmith, and then was employed at a woolen mill in Lockport, Pennsylvania. He became owner of the woolen mill and attained considerable wealth as a woolen manufacturer. Other business interests included the Westmoreland Coal Company, where he served as the first president of the company in 1854. He served for two terms in the Pennsylvania Legislature(House of Representatives). Two attempts to enter the Pennsylvania Senate were unsuccessful.

== United States House of Representatives ==
In 1854, he was elected to Congress as an Whig candidate.

After joining the Republican Party, he was re-elected to the 35th Congress in 1856. He was a strong supporter of the Freedmen's Bureau, the Civil Rights Act of 1866, and the Reconstruction Acts. He attended the Union National Convention in Philadelphia in 1866. On February 21, 1868, Covode introduced a resolution in the House of Representatives to impeach President Andrew Johnson. A slightly-amended version of this resolution, was passed by the House on February 24, 1868, thereby impeaching Johnson, but the Senate did not vote to convict him in his impeachment trial.

=== Committees ===
He served as chairman of the United States House Committee on Public Expenditures from 1857 until 1859 and the United States House Committee on Public Buildings and Grounds from 1867 until 1869. He also served on the United States Congressional Joint Committee on the Conduct of the War, in reference to the American Civil War.

==== Covode Committee ====
Covode is most famous for chairing a committee to investigate the possibility of impeaching President James Buchanan during the spring and summer of 1860. Officially titled the United States House Select Committee to Investigate Alleged Corruptions in Government, it is more popularly known as the Covode Committee after him.

=== United States House election, 1870 ===
Covode contested with Henry D. Foster the election to the Forty-first Congress, neither being sworn pending the contest, as no credentials were issued by the Governor. On February 9, 1870, the House declared him duly elected, whereupon he qualified and served until his death. Covode died in Harrisburg, Pennsylvania, aged 62.

== Family ==
His oldest son, George H. Covode (1835–1864), was a colonel in the Union Army during the Civil War. He died on June 25, 1864, after being shot in the arm and stomach by Confederate troops he had mistaken for Unionists.

== See also ==
- List of members of the United States Congress who died in office (1790–1899)

== Bibliography ==
- Chester, Edward W. "The Impact of the Covode Congressional Investigation." Western Pennsylvania Historical Magazine 42 (December 1959): 343-50
- Baker, Jean H.: James Buchanan, Times Books: 2004

U.S. House of Representatives
Preceded by Augustus Drum	Member of the U.S. House of Representatives from Pennsylvania's 19th congressional district 1855–1863	Succeeded by Glenni W. Scofield
Preceded by John L. Dawson	Member of the U.S. House of Representatives from Pennsylvania's 21st congressional district 1867–1871	Succeeded by Henry D. Foster
