= Articles of impeachment adopted against Andrew Johnson =

- Accused: Andrew Johnson (president of the United States)
- Charges: Eleven high crimes and misdemeanors
- Cause: Violating the Tenure of Office Act by attempting to replace Edwin Stanton, the secretary of war, while Congress was not in session and other alleged abuses of presidential power

Eleven articles of impeachment against United States President Andrew Johnson were adopted by the United States House of Representatives on March 2 and 3, 1868 as part of the impeachment of Johnson. An impeachment resolution had previously been adopted by the House on February 24, 1868. Each of the articles were a separate charge which Johnson would be tried for in his subsequent impeachment trial before the United States Senate.

The primary matter addressed by the articles of impeachment was President Johnson's effort to, in disregard for the Tenure of Office Act, dismiss Secretary of War Edwin Stanton and appoint Lorenzo Thomas as ad interim secretary of war. This effort had been the direct event which triggered Johnson's impeachment. However, several other allegations were also included in the eleven articles of impeachment, including an alleged violation by Johnson of the Command of Army Act and an allegation that Johnson attempted "to bring into disgrace, ridicule, hatred, contempt, and reproach the Congress of the United States."

In the impeachment trial, Senators voted on May 16, 1868, on their verdict for article eleven. Thirty-five senators found Johnson guilty and nineteen finding him not guilty. This meant that the Senate acquitted Johnson, failing by a single vote to reach the two-thirds majority required to convict. On May 26, 1868, the Senate voted with identical results on articles two and three. The Senate then voted to adjourn sine die, ending the trial without voting on the remaining eight articles.

== Background ==
Andrew Johnson ascended to the United States presidency after the 1865 assassination of Republican president Abraham Lincoln. Johnson, a Southern Democrat, had been elected vice president in 1864 on a unity ticket with Lincoln. As president, Johnson held open disagreements with the Republican majority of United States House and Senate (the two chambers of the United States Congress).

In 1861 and 1862, the Conspiracies Acts of 1861 and 1862 had been passed. The first of these acts, passed in 1861, would later be cited in some of the articles of impeachment against Johnson.

In the late summer of 1866, President Johnson embarked his national "Swing Around the Circle" speaking tour, in part to campaign for Democrats ahead of the 1866 United States elections. The tour backfired on Johnson, resulting in damaging reports in newspapers across the nation of his undisciplined and vitriolic speeches as well as ill-advised confrontations with hecklers. Contrary to Johnson's hopes, the 1866 elections produced veto-proof Republican Party majorities in both houses of the United States Congress. As a result, Radicals were able to take control of Reconstruction, passing a series of Reconstruction Acts—each one over the president's veto—addressing requirements for Southern states to be fully restored to the Union. The first of these acts divided those states, excluding Johnson's home state of Tennessee, into five military districts, and each state's government was put under the control of the U.S. military. Additionally, these states were required to enact new constitutions, ratify the Fourteenth Amendment, and guarantee voting rights for black males.

In March 1867, despite taking formal issue with the Command of Army Act, arguing that it is unconstitutional, President Johnson signed the appropriations bill containing the act. An alleged violation of act would later be the subject of the ninth article of impeachment that was adopted against Johnson.

=== Early efforts to impeach Johnson ===
Johnson's conflict with the Republican-controlled Congress led to a number of efforts being taken since 1866, particularly by Radical Republicans, to impeach Johnson. On January 7, 1867, the House of Representatives voted to launch of an impeachment inquiry run by the House Committee on the Judiciary, which resulted in a November 25, 1867 5–4 vote by the committee to recommend impeachment. However, on December 7, 1867, vote, the full House rejected impeachment by a 108–57 vote. On January 22, 1868, the House approved by a vote of 103–37 a resolution launching a second impeachment inquiry run by House Select Committee on Reconstruction.

=== Tenure of Office Act and Johnson’s effort to dismiss Edwin Stanton ===
In 1867, the Congress had passed the Tenure of Office Act and enacted it by successfully overriding Johnson's veto. The law was written with the intent of both curbing Johnson's power and protecting United States Secretary of War Edwin Stanton from being removed from his office unilaterally by Johnson. Stanton was a strongly aligned with the Radical Republicans, and acted as an executive branch ally to the Reconstruction policies of the congressional Radical Republicans. The Tenure of Office Act restricted the power of the United States president to suspend Senate-confirmed federal branch officers while the Senate was not in session. The Tenure of Office Act was put in place to prevent the president from dismissing an officer that had been previously appointed with the advice and consent of the Senate without the Senate's approval to remove them. Per the law, if the president dismissed such an officer when the Senate was in recess, and the Senate voted upon reconvening against ratifying the removal, the president would be required to reinstate the individual. Johnson, during a Senate recess in August 1867, suspended Stanton pending the next session of the Senate and appointed Ulysses S. Grant as acting secretary of war. When the Senate convened on January 13, 1868, it refused to ratify the removal by a vote of 35–6. However, disregarding this vote, on February 21, 1868, President Johnson attempted to replace Stanton with Lorenzo Thomas in an apparent violation of the Tenure of Office Act.

The Tenure of Office Act was officially titled "an act regulating the tenure of certain civil office", and was referred to by such name in the articles of impeachment that were adopted in Johnson's impeachment.

=== House passage of the impeachment resolution ===
The same day that Johnson attempted to replace Stanton with Thomas, a one sentence resolution to impeach Johnson, written by John Covode, was referred to the House Select Committee on Reconstruction (which was running the second impeachment inquiry against Johnson). On February 22, the House Select Committee on Reconstruction released a report which recommended Johnson be impeached for high crimes and misdemeanors, and also reported an amended version of the impeachment resolution. On February 24, the House of Representatives voted 126–47 to impeach Johnson for "high crimes and misdemeanors". Johnson's impeachment the first of a United States president. It was also only the sixth federal impeachment in American history.

== Drafting of the articles ==
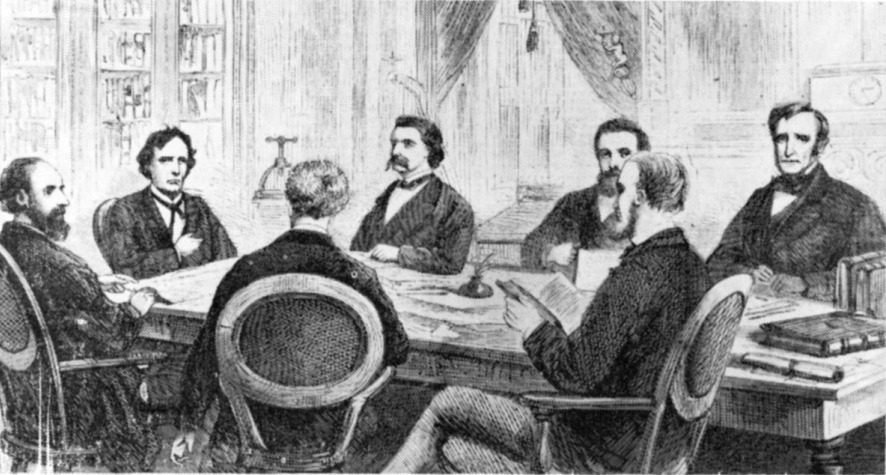
Illustration of the seven-member committee meeting to draft the articles of impeachment. From left to right: Thaddeus Stevens, James F. Wilson, Hamilton Ward (back of head), John A. Logan, George S. Boutwell, George Washington Julian, John Bingham

After the passage of the impeachment resolution, the House's attention turned to the adoption of articles of impeachment which the Senate would try Johnson on. The approach of having the vote to impeach be an entirely separate vote from the adoption of article(s) of impeachment differs from the approach that has been practiced in more recent United States federal impeachments, in which impeachment has occurred directly through the adoption of article(s) of impeachment. However, the manner in which Johnson was impeached appears to have been the standard order of procedure for nineteenth century federal impeachments in the United States, as each of the five previous impeachments of federal officials that had led to a Senate trial had been conducted the same way, with votes to impeach occurring before votes on articles of impeachment.

After the vote to impeach Johnson, Thaddeus Stevens submitted a pair of resolutions that both created a two-person committee tasked with presenting to the Senate bar the impeachment resolution that had been passed and informing the Senate that the House would "in due time" exhibit specific articles of impeachment, and which also created a seven-person committee to prepare and report articles of impeachment. The resolutions gave that seven-person committee the power to subpoena people, papers, and records, and to record sworn testimony. After procedural votes, the House approved both of Stevens' resolutions in a single 124–42 vote. No members of the Republican Party voted against it, while no members of the Democratic Party voted for it. Before the House adjourned for the evening, Speaker Schuyler Colfax appointed John Bingham and Thaddeus Stevens to the two-person committee tasked with informing the Senate of Johnson's impeachment, and also appointed John Bingham, George S. Boutwell, and Thaddeus Stevens (all of whom had been members of the House Select Committee on Reconstruction) along with George Washington Julian, House Committee on the Judiciary Chairman James F. Wilson, John A. Logan, and Hamilton Ward to the seven-person committee tasked with writing the articles of impeachment. The committee held their first meeting later that day.

The committee held their meetings in the room in the United States Capitol that was usually utilized by the House Judiciary Committee. They set a quick timetable for themselves in which they intended to release articles of impeachment within two days and have them approved by the House and presented to the Senate within six days.

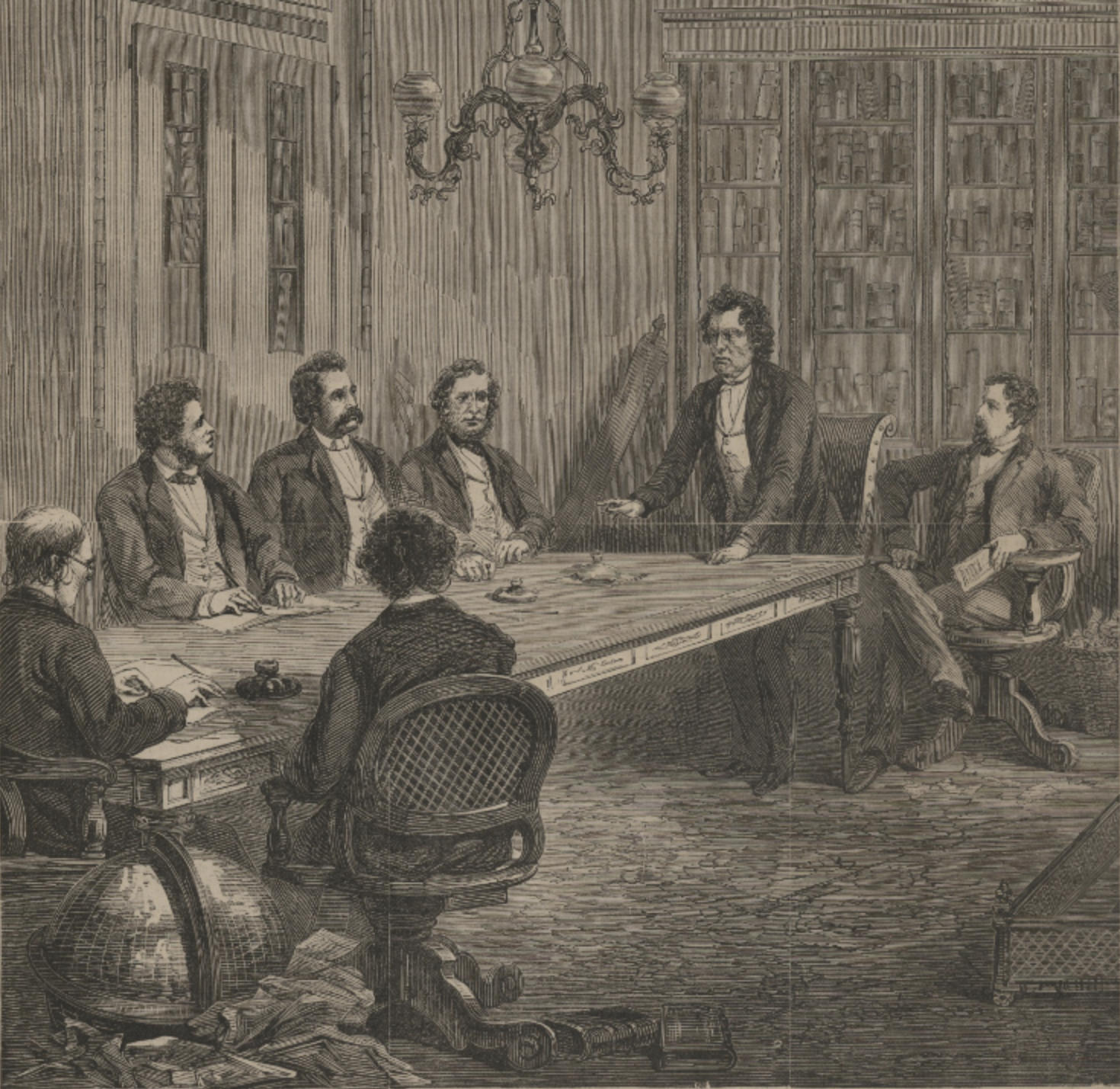
Illustration of the seven-member committee deliberating on February 27, 1868

Thaddeus Stevens would at the time, in an interview, describe the subcommittee's approach as reflective of its members' egotism. Stevens characterized the process as having seen each member first individually write their own articles of impeachment, with the committee then sorting through the resulting proposed articles and aggregating them together. Stevens was concerned that this process could lead the committee to disagree over which articles to adopt, with members playing favorites to ones that they had written.

Part of the process the committee took was also collecting evidence and taking testimony. On February 26, 1868, the committee took testimony from Lorenzo Thomas, William H. Emory (the head of the Washington garrison), and from Emory's own second-in-command.

It was decided by the committee members to not include any of the charges that had been recommended by the majority report of the House Judiciary Committee in November 1867 at the end of the first impeachment inquiry against Johnson. The New York Times reported that inclusion of those claims would be seen as fatally harming the, "moral and legal effect of the prosecution." The articles ultimately produced by the committee were narrow in their focus and were legalistic and modeled on criminal indictment. This was likely in direct reaction to the failure of broad scope of the allegations cited in the failed 1867 effort to impeach Johnson.

The committee reached disagreement on how many articles of impeachment to adopt. Some wanted as few as three, while others wanted as many as six. However, pressures ultimately prevailed in favor of creating a larger number of articles, and eight articles were ultimately created. This was a possible misstep, as the articles, which all focused on Johnson's actions regarding Secretary Stanton, overlapped with one another creating unneeded complexity, as a single impeachment article could have sufficed. Eight concerned the violation of the Tenure of Office Act, while the ninth accused him of violating the Command of Army Act by pressuring General William H. Emory to ignore Acting Secretary of War Grant and to instead take orders directly from Johnson.

Thaddeus Stevens, a Radical Republican himself, felt that Radical Republicans on the committee were yielding too much to moderate Republicans to limit the scope of the violations of law that the articles of impeachment would charge Johnson with. He wrote Benjamin F. Butler, proposing that, while Stevens worked to add two more additional articles to the seven already written by the committee, Butler would write his own separate article of impeachment from outside of the committee. Butler accepted this proposal.

== Adoption of the articles ==
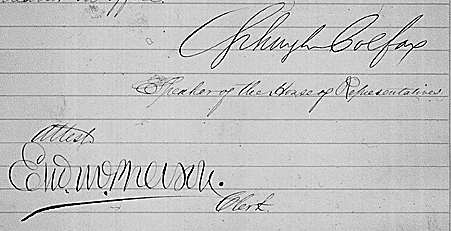
Signature of Speaker of the House Schuyler Colfax (upper right) and an attestation of Edward McPherson, clerk of the United States House of Representatives (lower left) on an official copy of the eleven articles of impeachment

=== March 2, 1868 ===
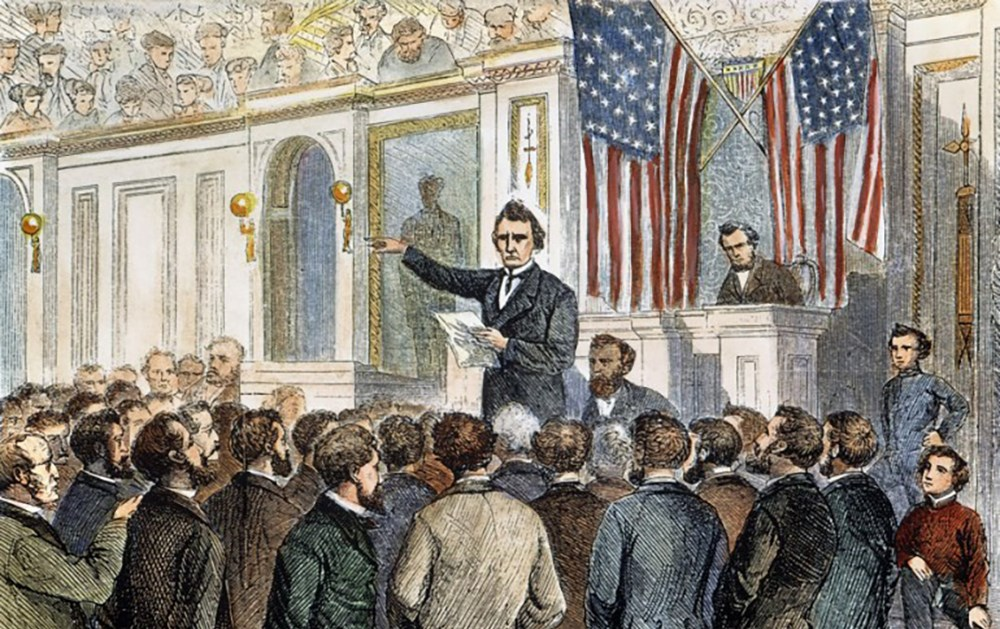
Illustration of Thaddeus Stevens speaking during March 2, 1868 debate

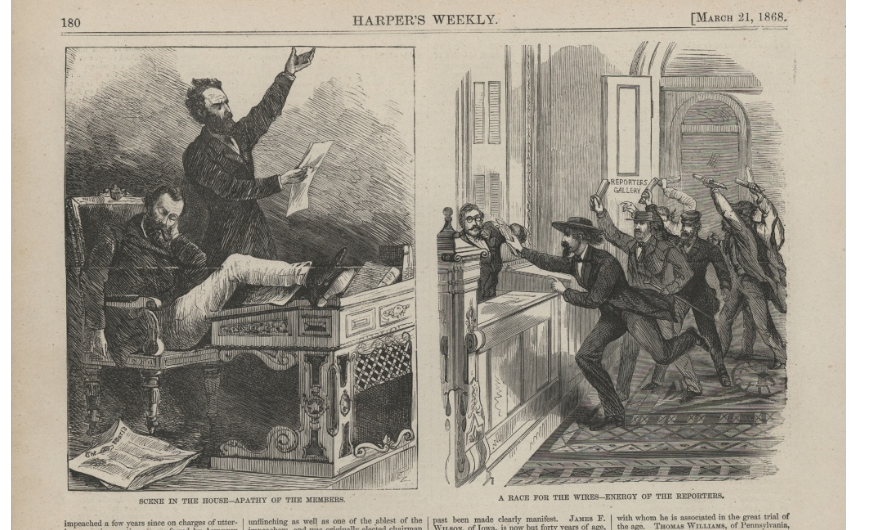
Set of illustrations. The illustration on the left depicts Democratic Congressman Albert G. Burr (left) sleeping while Republican Congressman John Winthrop Chanler delivers a loud speech during debate on the adoption of articles of impeachment. The image on right depicts reports rushing to the telegraph office as soon as the articles of impeachment were published.

On behalf of the committee of seven, Boutwell delivered ten proposed articles of impeachment to the House on February 29, 1868. Many Radical Republicans felt that the articles, focusing so narrowly on two specific actions of Johnson (his actions regarding his effort to dismiss Stanton and his alleged violation of the Command of Army Act), excluding the many other misdeeds of Johnson's that they took issue with. When the articles were presented, many House Republicans were disappointed by the articles that had been produced, seeing them as poorly conceived. Some members urged that the House of Representatives not proceed to debate the articles on March 1 and 2, as scheduled, but instead slow down the process of adopting articles in order to remedy the deficiencies that they held the series of proposed articles possessed. On March 2, the House voted to ratify the nine articles of impeachment referred to it by the committee of seven.

At the close of the March 2 debate, Thaddeus Stevens took the floor to criticize the committee of seven for going too easy on Johnson, declaring,

Never was so great a malefactor so gently treated as Andrew Johnson. The people have been unwilling to blot the records of their country by mingling his crimes with their shame—shame for endurance for so long a time of his great crimes and misdemeanor.

Stevens further alleged that the committee had a determination "to deal gently with the president" and had omitted from the articles many crimes, instead including only "the most trifling crimes and misdemeanors." He argued that the articles put before the house had failed to address just how much Johnson had imperiled the governing structure of the United States. He, nevertheless, declared that each of the committee's articles were still justified charges, and delivered long remarks on how each should be approved in order to rid the nation of the "unfortunate man" occupying its presidency.

When Stevens finished his remarks, Boutwell brought forward revised versions of the impeachment articles, with there now only being nine articles proposed by the committee. The House rejected a number of motions to consider adding further articles before Benjamin Butler submitted his own lengthy impeachment article, inspired by Stevens' request to him, which stated no clear violation of law, but instead charged Johnson with attempting, "to bring into disgrace, ridicule, hatred, contempt, and reproach the Congress of the United States." The article written in response to speeches that Johnson had made during his "Swing Around the Circle". Butler's remarks on his impeachment resolution were very long, and this frustrated many, even including Stevens. The House quickly rejected Butler's article before approving all nine articles from the committee one by one.

March 2, 1868, vote totals
Article introduced by Benjamin Butler	Party					Total votes
Article introduced by Benjamin Butler	Democratic	Republican	Conservative	Conservative Republican	Independent Republican	Total votes
Yea	Detailed roll call not reported by the Congressional Globe					48
Nay	Detailed roll call not reported by the Congressional Globe					74
First article	Party					Total votes
First article	Democratic	Republican	Conservative	Conservative Republican	Independent Republican	Total votes
Yea	0	127	0	0	0	127
Nay	40	0	0	1	1	42
Second article	Party					Total votes
Second article	Democratic	Republican	Conservative	Conservative Republican	Independent Republican	Total votes
Yea	0	124	0	0	0	124
Nay	39	0	0	1	1	41
Third article	Party					Total votes
Third article	Democratic	Republican	Conservative	Conservative Republican	Independent Republican	Total votes
Yea	1	123	0	0	0	124
Nay	38	0	0	1	1	40
Fourth article	Party					Total votes
Fourth article	Democratic	Republican	Conservative	Conservative Republican	Independent Republican	Total votes
Yea	1	116	0	0	0	117
Nay	39	0	0	0	1	40
Fifth article	Party					Total votes
Fifth article	Democratic	Republican	Conservative	Conservative Republican	Independent Republican	Total votes
Yea	0	127	0	0	0	127
Nay	40	0	0	1	1	42
Sixth article	Party					Total votes
Sixth article	Democratic	Republican	Conservative	Conservative Republican	Independent Republican	Total votes
Yea	0	127	0	0	0	127
Nay	40	0	0	1	1	42
Seventh article	Party					Total votes
Seventh article	Democratic	Republican	Conservative	Conservative Republican	Independent Republican	Total votes
Yea	0	127	0	0	0	127
Nay	40	0	0	1	1	42
Eighth article	Party					Total votes
Eighth article	Democratic	Republican	Conservative	Conservative Republican	Independent Republican	Total votes
Yea	0	127	0	0	0	127
Nay	40	0	0	1	1	42
Ninth article	Party					Total votes
Ninth article	Democratic	Republican	Conservative	Conservative Republican	Independent Republican	Total votes
Yea	0	108	0	0	0	108
Nay	39	0	0	1	1	41

=== March 3, 1868 ===
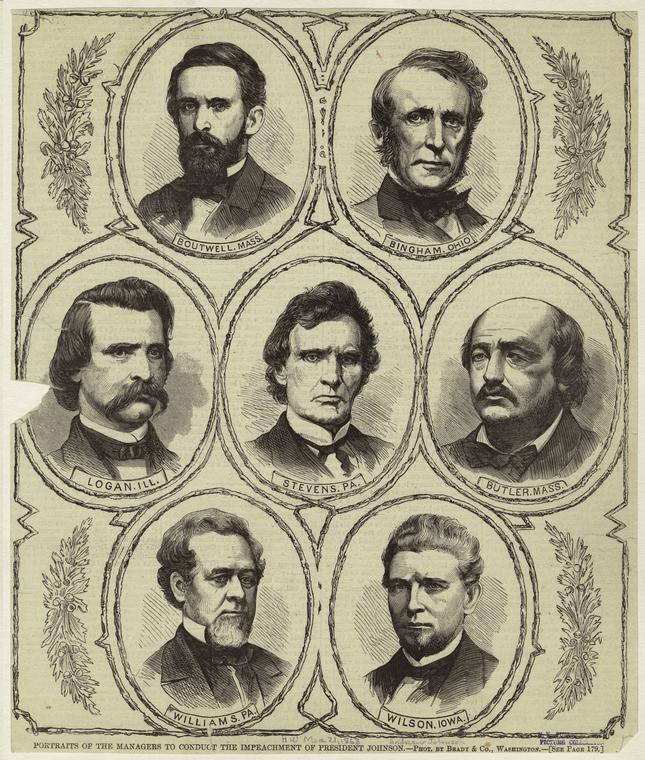
On March 3, 1868, the House impeachment managers (illustrated) successfully requested the passage of two additional articles of impeachment

After the March 2 adoption of articles of impeachment, the House appointed the impeachment managers that would serve as prosecutors in the impeachment trial before the Senate. The following day, in hopes of strengthening the case that they would bring before the Senate, the impeachment managers requested that the House consider additional charges. First, the managers reported the article previously proposed by Butler, which they reintroduced as the tenth article. It was approved. After this, an eleventh article drafted by Thaddeus Stevens and James F. Wilson was approved without debate by an overwhelming margin. The eleventh article accused Johnson of violating his oath of office to "take care that the laws be faithfully executed" by declaring that the 39th United States Congress was unconstitutional because it only represented some of the United States (with unreconstructed states being excluded) and therefore lacked legislative powers or the power to propose amendments to the Constitution of the United States.

March 3, 1868, vote totals
Tenth article	Party					Total votes
Tenth article	Democratic	Republican	Conservative	Conservative Republican	Independent Republican	Total votes
Yea	0	88	0	0	0	88
Nay	31	12	0	1	1	45
Eleventh article	Party					Total votes
Eleventh article	Democratic	Republican	Conservative	Conservative Republican	Independent Republican	Total votes
Yea	0	109	0	0	0	109
Nay	30	0	0	1	1	32

=== Table detailing the votes individual House members ===
Votes by member
District	Member	Party	Votes on articles										
District	Member	Party	1st	2nd	3rd	4th	5th	6th	7th	8th	9th	10th	11th
Kentucky 8	George Madison Adams	Democrat	Nay	Nay	Nay	Nay	Nay	Nay	Nay	Nay	Nay	Nay	Nay
Iowa 3	William B. Allison	Republican	Yea	Yea	Yea	Yea	Yea	Yea	Yea	Yea	Yea	Yea	Yea
Massachusetts 2	Oakes Ames	Republican	Yea	Yea	Yea	Yea	Yea	Yea	Yea	Yea	Yea	Yea	Yea
Missouri 9	George Washington Anderson	Republican	Yea	Yea	Yea	Yea	Yea	Yea	Yea	Yea	Absent	Absent	Absent
Maryland 2	Stevenson Archer	Democrat	Nay	Nay	Nay	Nay	Nay	Nay	Nay	Nay	Nay	Nay	Nay
Tennessee 6	Samuel Mayes Arnell	Republican	Yea	Yea	Yea	Yea	Yea	Yea	Yea	Yea	Yea	Absent	Absent
Nevada at-large	Delos R. Ashley	Republican	Yea	Yea	Yea	Yea	Yea	Yea	Yea	Yea	Yea	Nay	Yea
Ohio 10	James Mitchell Ashley	Republican	Yea	Yea	Yea	Yea	Yea	Yea	Yea	Yea	Yea	Yea	Yea
California 1	Samuel Beach Axtell	Democrat	Nay	Nay	Nay	Nay	Nay	Nay	Nay	Nay	Nay	Absent	Absent
New York 21	Alexander H. Bailey	Republican	Yea	Yea	Yea	Yea	Yea	Yea	Yea	Yea	Yea	Absent	Absent
Illinois 12	Jehu Baker	Republican	Absent	Absent	Absent	Absent	Absent	Absent	Absent	Absent	Absent	Absent	Absent
Massachusetts 8	John Denison Baldwin	Republican	Yea	Yea	Yea	Yea	Yea	Yea	Yea	Yea	Absent	Yea	Yea
Massachusetts 6	Nathaniel P. Banks	Republican	Yea	Yea	Yea	Yea	Yea	Yea	Yea	Yea	Absent	Yea	Yea
New York 2	Demas Barnes	Democrat	Absent	Absent	Absent	Absent	Absent	Absent	Absent	Absent	Absent	Absent	Absent
Connecticut 4	William Henry Barnum	Democrat	Nay	Nay	Nay	Nay	Nay	Nay	Nay	Nay	Nay	Nay	Nay
Michigan 1	Fernando C. Beaman	Republican	Yea	Yea	Yea	Yea	Yea	Yea	Yea	Yea	Yea	Yea	Yea
Ohio 8	John Beatty	Republican	Yea	Yea	Yea	Yea	Yea	Yea	Yea	Yea	Yea	Yea	Yea
Kentucky 7	James B. Beck	Democrat	Nay	Nay	Nay	Nay	Nay	Nay	Nay	Nay	Nay	Nay	Nay
Missouri 8	John F. Benjamin	Republican	Absent	Absent	Absent	Absent	Absent	Absent	Absent	Absent	Absent	Absent	Absent
New Hampshire 3	Jacob Benton	Republican	Yea	Yea	Yea	Yea	Yea	Yea	Yea	Yea	Yea	Absent	Absent
Ohio 16	John Bingham	Republican	Yea	Yea	Yea	Yea	Yea	Yea	Yea	Yea	Yea	Yea	Yea
Maine 3	James G. Blaine	Republican	Yea	Yea	Yea	Yea	Yea	Yea	Yea	Yea	Absent	Yea	Yea
Michigan 3	Austin Blair	Republican	Yea	Yea	Yea	Yea	Yea	Yea	Yea	Yea	Yea	Yea	Yea
Massachusetts 7	George S. Boutwell	Republican	Yea	Yea	Yea	Yea	Yea	Yea	Yea	Yea	Yea	Yea	Yea
Pennsylvania 6	Benjamin Markley Boyer	Democrat	Nay	Nay	Nay	Nay	Nay	Nay	Nay	Nay	Nay	Absent	Absent
Illinois 7	Henry P. H. Bromwell	Republican	Yea	Yea	Yea	Yea	Yea	Yea	Yea	Yea	Yea	Absent	Absent
New York 8	James Brooks	Democrat	Nay	Nay	Nay	Nay	Nay	Nay	Nay	Nay	Nay	Nay	Nay
Pennsylvania 7	John Martin Broomall	Republican	Yea	Yea	Yea	Yea	Yea	Yea	Yea	Yea	Yea	Yea	Yea
Ohio 9	Ralph Pomeroy Buckland	Republican	Yea	Yea	Yea	Yea	Yea	Yea	Yea	Yea	Yea	Absent	Absent
Illinois 10	Albert G. Burr	Democrat	Nay	Nay	Nay	Nay	Nay	Nay	Nay	Nay	Absent	Nay	Nay
Massachusetts 5	Benjamin Butler	Republican	Yea	Yea	Yea	Absent	Yea	Yea	Yea	Yea	Yea	Yea	Yea
Pennsylvania 10	Henry L. Cake	Republican	Yea	Yea	Yea	Yea	Yea	Yea	Yea	Yea	Yea	Yea	Yea
Ohio 2	Samuel Fenton Cary	Independent Republican	Nay	Nay	Nay	Nay	Nay	Nay	Nay	Nay	Nay	Nay	Nay
New York 7	John Winthrop Chanler	Democrat	Nay	Nay	Nay	Nay	Nay	Nay	Nay	Nay	Nay	Absent	Absent
New York 22	John C. Churchill	Republican	Yea	Yea	Yea	Yea	Yea	Yea	Yea	Yea	Yea	Yea	Yea
Ohio 6	Reader W. Clarke	Republican	Yea	Yea	Yea	Yea	Yea	Yea	Yea	Yea	Absent	Yea	Yea
Kansas at-large	Sidney Clarke	Republican	Yea	Yea	Yea	Yea	Yea	Yea	Yea	Yea	Yea	Yea	Yea
Wisconsin 3	Amasa Cobb	Republican	Yea	Yea	Yea	Yea	Yea	Yea	Yea	Yea	Yea	Yea	Yea
Indiana 6	John Coburn	Republican	Yea	Yea	Yea	Yea	Yea	Yea	Yea	Yea	Yea	Nay	Yea
Indiana 9	Schuyler Colfax	Republican	Did not vote (speaker)^{α}										
Illinois 6	Burton C. Cook	Republican	Yea	Yea	Yea	Yea	Yea	Yea	Yea	Yea	Yea	Yea	Yea
New York 13	Thomas Cornell	Republican	Yea	Yea	Yea	Yea	Yea	Yea	Yea	Yea	Yea	Absent	Yea
Pennsylvania 21	John Covode	Republican	Yea	Absent	Yea	Yea	Yea	Yea	Yea	Yea	Yea	Absent	Absent
Illinois 8	Shelby Moore Cullom	Republican	Yea	Yea	Yea	Yea	Yea	Yea	Yea	Yea	Yea	Yea	Yea
Massachusetts 10	Henry L. Dawes	Republican	Yea	Yea	Yea	Yea	Yea	Yea	Yea	Yea	Yea	Absent	Absent
Rhode Island 2	Nathan F. Dixon II	Republican	Yea	Yea	Yea	Yea	Yea	Yea	Yea	Yea	Yea	Absent	Yea
Iowa 5	Grenville M. Dodge	Republican	Yea	Yea	Yea	Yea	Yea	Yea	Yea	Yea	Yea	Absent	Absent
Minnesota 2	Ignatius L. Donnelly	Republican	Yea	Yea	Yea	Yea	Yea	Yea	Yea	Yea	Yea	Yea	Yea
Michigan 6	John F. Driggs	Republican	Yea	Yea	Yea	Yea	Yea	Yea	Yea	Yea	Yea	Yea	Yea
Ohio 17	Ephraim R. Eckley	Republican	Absent	Absent	Absent	Absent	Absent	Absent	Absent	Absent	Absent	Absent	Absent
Ohio 1	Benjamin Eggleston	Republican	Yea	Yea	Yea	Yea	Yea	Yea	Yea	Yea	Yea	Yea	Yea
New Hampshire 1	Jacob Hart Ela	Republican	Absent	Absent	Absent	Absent	Absent	Absent	Absent	Absent	Absent	Absent	Absent
Wisconsin 4	Charles A. Eldredge	Democrat	Nay	Nay	Nay	Nay	Nay	Nay	Nay	Nay	Nay	Nay	Absent
Massachusetts 1	Thomas D. Eliot	Republican	Yea	Yea	Yea	Yea	Yea	Yea	Yea	Yea	Yea	Yea	Yea
Illinois 2	John F. Farnsworth	Republican	Yea	Yea	Yea	Yea	Yea	Yea	Yea	Yea	Absent	Yea	Yea
New York 16	Orange Ferriss	Republican	Yea	Yea	Yea	Yea	Yea	Yea	Yea	Yea	Yea	Yea	Yea
Michigan 4	Thomas W. Ferry	Republican	Yea	Yea	Yea	Yea	Yea	Yea	Yea	Yea	Yea	Yea	Yea
New York 19	William C. Fields	Republican	Yea	Yea	Yea	Yea	Yea	Yea	Yea	Yea	Yea	Absent	Absent
Pennsylvania 20	Darwin Abel Finney	Republican	Absent	Absent	Absent	Absent	Absent	Absent	Absent	Absent	Absent	Absent	Absent
New York 4	John Fox	Democrat	Nay	Nay	Nay	Nay	Nay	Nay	Nay	Nay	Nay	Absent	Absent
Ohio 19	James A. Garfield	Republican	Yea	Yea	Yea	Yea	Yea	Yea	Yea	Yea	Yea	Yea	Yea
Pennsylvania 8	James Lawrence Getz	Democrat	Nay	Nay	Nay	Nay	Nay	Nay	Nay	Nay	Nay	Absent	Nay
Pennsylvania 15	Adam John Glossbrenner	Democrat	Nay	Nay	Nay	Nay	Nay	Nay	Nay	Nay	Nay	Absent	Absent
Kentucky 3	Jacob Golladay	Democrat	Nay	Nay	Nay	Nay	Nay	Nay	Nay	Nay	Nay	Nay	Nay
Missouri 4	Joseph J. Gravely	Republican	Yea	Yea	Yea	Yea	Yea	Yea	Yea	Yea	Yea	Yea	Yea
New York 15	John Augustus Griswold	Republican	Yea	Yea	Yea	Yea	Yea	Yea	Yea	Yea	Absent	Nay	Yea
Kentucky 5	Asa Grover	Democrat	Nay	Nay	Nay	Nay	Nay	Nay	Nay	Nay	Nay	Nay	Nay
New Jersey 2	Charles Haight	Democrat	Nay	Nay	Nay	Yea	Nay	Nay	Nay	Nay	Nay	Nay	Nay
New Jersey 5	George A. Halsey	Republican	Yea	Yea	Yea	Yea	Yea	Yea	Yea	Yea	Yea	Yea	Yea
Illinois 4	Abner C. Harding	Republican	Yea	Yea	Yea	Yea	Yea	Yea	Yea	Yea	Yea	Yea	Yea
Tennessee 7	Isaac Roberts Hawkins	Republican	Absent	Absent	Absent	Absent	Absent	Absent	Absent	Absent	Absent	Absent	Absent
California 2	William Higby	Republican	Yea	Yea	Yea	Absent	Yea	Yea	Yea	Yea	Absent	Yea	Yea
New Jersey 4	John Hill	Republican	Yea	Yea	Yea	Yea	Yea	Yea	Yea	Yea	Yea	Yea	Yea
Indiana 4	William S. Holman	Democrat	Nay	Nay	Nay	Nay	Nay	Nay	Nay	Nay	Nay	Nay	Nay
Massachusetts 4	Samuel Hooper	Republican	Yea	Yea	Yea	Yea	Yea	Yea	Yea	Yea	Yea	Yea	Yea
Wisconsin 2	Benjamin F. Hopkins	Republican	Yea	Yea	Yea	Yea	Yea	Yea	Yea	Yea	Yea	Yea	Yea
Connecticut 2	Julius Hotchkiss	Democrat	Nay	Nay	Nay	Nay	Nay	Nay	Nay	Nay	Nay	Nay	Nay
Iowa 6	Asahel W. Hubbard	Republican	Absent	Absent	Absent	Absent	Absent	Absent	Absent	Absent	Absent	Absent	Absent
West Virginia 1	Chester D. Hubbard	Republican	Yea	Yea	Yea	Yea	Yea	Yea	Yea	Yea	Yea	Yea	Yea
Connecticut 1	Richard D. Hubbard	Democrat	Absent	Absent	Nay	Nay	Absent	Absent	Absent	Absent	Nay	Absent	Absent
New York 17	Calvin T. Hulburd	Republican	Yea	Yea	Yea	Yea	Yea	Yea	Yea	Yea	Yea	Yea	Yea
New York 30	James M. Humphrey	Democrat	Nay	Nay	Nay	Absent	Nay	Nay	Nay	Nay	Nay	Nay	Nay
Indiana 3	Morton C. Hunter	Republican	Yea	Yea	Yea	Yea	Yea	Yea	Yea	Yea	Yea	Yea	Yea
Illinois 5	Ebon C. Ingersoll	Republican	Yea	Yea	Yea	Yea	Yea	Yea	Yea	Yea	Yea	Yea	Yea
Rhode Island 1	Thomas Jenckes	Republican	Yea	Yea	Yea	Yea	Yea	Yea	Yea	Yea	Yea	Absent	Yea
California 3	James A. Johnson	Democrat	Nay	Nay	Nay	Nay	Nay	Nay	Nay	Nay	Nay	Nay	Nay
Kentucky 6	Thomas Laurens Jones	Democrat	Nay	Nay	Nay	Nay	Nay	Nay	Nay	Nay	Nay	Nay	Nay
Illinois 1	Norman B. Judd	Republican	Yea	Yea	Yea	Yea	Yea	Yea	Yea	Yea	Yea	Yea	Yea
Indiana 5	George Washington Julian	Republican	Yea	Yea	Yea	Yea	Yea	Yea	Yea	Yea	Yea	Yea	Yea
Pennsylvania 4	William D. Kelley	Republican	Yea	Yea	Yea	Yea	Yea	Yea	Yea	Yea	Yea	Yea	Yea
New York 25	William H. Kelsey	Republican	Yea	Yea	Yea	Yea	Yea	Yea	Yea	Yea	Yea	Yea	Yea
Indiana 2	Michael C. Kerr	Democrat	Nay	Absent	Nay	Nay	Nay	Nay	Nay	Nay	Nay	Nay	Nay
New York 12	John H. Ketcham	Republican	Yea	Yea	Yea	Yea	Yea	Yea	Yea	Yea	Yea	Absent	Yea
West Virginia 2	Bethuel Kitchen	Republican	Yea	Yea	Yea	Yea	Yea	Yea	Yea	Yea	Absent	Yea	Yea
Kentucky 4	J. Proctor Knott	Democrat	Nay	Nay	Nay	Nay	Nay	Nay	Nay	Nay	Nay	Nay	Nay
Pennsylvania 16	William Henry Koontz	Republican	Yea	Yea	Yea	Yea	Yea	Yea	Yea	Yea	Yea	Yea	Yea
New York 20	Addison H. Laflin	Republican	Yea	Yea	Yea	Yea	Yea	Yea	Yea	Yea	Yea	Nay	Yea
Pennsylvania 24	George Van Eman Lawrence	Republican	Yea	Yea	Yea	Yea	Yea	Yea	Yea	Yea	Yea	Yea	Yea
Ohio 4	William Lawrence	Republican	Yea	Yea	Yea	Yea	Yea	Yea	Yea	Yea	Yea	Yea	Yea
Missouri 7	Benjamin F. Loan	Republican	Yea	Yea	Yea	Yea	Yea	Yea	Yea	Yea	Yea	Yea	Yea
New York 26	William S. Lincoln	Republican	Yea	Yea	Yea	Yea	Yea	Yea	Yea	Yea	Yea	Yea	Yea
Illinois at-large	John A. Logan	Republican	Yea	Yea	Yea	Yea	Yea	Yea	Yea	Yea	Yea	Yea	Yea
Iowa 4	William Loughridge	Republican	Yea	Absent	Yea	Absent	Yea	Yea	Yea	Yea	Absent	Yea	Yea
Maine 1	John Lynch	Republican	Yea	Yea	Yea	Yea	Yea	Yea	Yea	Yea	Yea	Yea	Yea
Oregon at-large	Rufus Mallory	Republican	Yea	Yea	Yea	Yea	Yea	Yea	Yea	Yea	Yea	Nay	Yea
Illinois 11	Samuel S. Marshall	Democrat	Nay	Nay	Nay	Nay	Nay	Nay	Nay	Nay	Nay	Nay	Nay
New York 18	James M. Marvin	Republican	Yea	Yea	Yea	Yea	Yea	Yea	Yea	Yea	Yea	Nay	Yea
Tennessee 2	Horace Maynard	Republican	Yea	Yea	Yea	Yea	Yea	Yea	Yea	Yea	Yea	Yea	Yea
New York 23	Dennis McCarthy	Republican	Yea	Yea	Yea	Yea	Yea	Yea	Yea	Yea	Yea	Yea	Yea
Missouri 5	Joseph W. McClurg	Republican	Yea	Yea	Yea	Yea	Yea	Yea	Yea	Yea	Yea	Yea	Yea
Missouri 3	James Robinson McCormick	Democrat	Nay	Nay	Nay	Nay	Nay	Nay	Nay	Nay	Nay	Nay	Nay
Maryland 1	Hiram McCullough	Democrat	Absent	Absent	Absent	Absent	Absent	Absent	Absent	Absent	Absent	Absent	Absent
Pennsylvania 13	Ulysses Mercur	Republican	Yea	Yea	Yea	Yea	Yea	Yea	Yea	Yea	Yea	Yea	Yea
Pennsylvania 14	George Funston Miller	Republican	Yea	Yea	Yea	Yea	Yea	Yea	Yea	Yea	Yea	Yea	Yea
New Jersey 1	William Moore	Republican	Yea	Yea	Yea	Yea	Yea	Yea	Yea	Yea	Yea	Yea	Yea
Pennsylvania 22	James K. Moorhead	Republican	Absent	Absent	Absent	Absent	Absent	Absent	Absent	Absent	Absent	Absent	Absent
Ohio 13	George W. Morgan	Democrat	Nay	Nay	Yea	Nay	Nay	Nay	Nay	Nay	Nay	Nay	Nay
Pennsylvania 17	Daniel Johnson Morrell	Republican	Yea	Yea	Yea	Yea	Yea	Yea	Yea	Yea	Yea	Yea	Yea
New York 5	John Morrissey	Democrat	Absent	Absent	Absent	Absent	Absent	Absent	Absent	Absent	Absent	Absent	Absent
Tennessee 4	James Mullins	Republican	Yea	Absent	Yea	Yea	Yea	Yea	Yea	Yea	Yea	Absent	Absent
Ohio 5	William Mungen	Democrat	Nay	Nay	Absent	Nay	Nay	Nay	Nay	Nay	Nay	Nay	Nay
Pennsylvania 3	Leonard Myers	Republican	Yea	Yea	Yea	Yea	Yea	Yea	Yea	Yea	Yea	Yea	Yea
Missouri 2	Carman A. Newcomb	Republican	Yea	Yea	Yea	Absent	Yea	Yea	Yea	Yea	Yea	Yea	Yea
Indiana 1	William E. Niblack	Democrat	Nay	Nay	Nay	Nay	Nay	Nay	Nay	Nay	Nay	Nay	Nay
Delaware at-large	John A. Nicholson	Democrat	Nay	Nay	Nay	Nay	Nay	Nay	Nay	Nay	Absent	Nay	Nay
Tennessee 8	David Alexander Nunn	Republican	Yea	Yea	Yea	Yea	Yea	Yea	Yea	Yea	Yea	Absent	Absent
Pennsylvania 2	Charles O'Neill	Republican	Yea	Yea	Yea	Yea	Yea	Yea	Yea	Yea	Yea	Yea	Yea
Indiana 8	Godlove Stein Orth	Republican	Yea	Yea	Yea	Yea	Yea	Yea	Yea	Yea	Yea	Yea	Yea
Wisconsin 1	Halbert E. Paine	Republican	Yea	Yea	Yea	Yea	Yea	Yea	Yea	Yea	Yea	Absent	Yea
Maine 2	Sidney Perham	Republican	Yea	Yea	Yea	Yea	Yea	Yea	Yea	Yea	Yea	Yea	Yea
Maine 4	John A. Peters	Republican	Yea	Yea	Yea	Yea	Yea	Yea	Yea	Yea	Yea	Absent	Absent
Maryland 3	Charles E. Phelps	Conservative	Absent	Absent	Absent	Absent	Absent	Absent	Absent	Absent	Absent	Absent	Absent
Maine 5	Frederick Augustus Pike	Republican	Yea	Yea	Yea	Yea	Yea	Yea	Yea	Yea	Yea	Yea	Yea
Missouri 1	William A. Pile	Republican	Absent	Absent	Absent	Absent	Absent	Absent	Absent	Absent	Absent	Absent	Absent
Ohio 15	Tobias A. Plants	Republican	Yea	Yea	Yea	Yea	Yea	Yea	Yea	Yea	Absent	Absent	Yea
Vermont 2	Luke P. Poland	Republican	Yea	Yea	Yea	Absent	Yea	Yea	Yea	Yea	Absent	Absent	Yea
West Virginia 3	Daniel Polsley	Republican	Yea	Yea	Yea	Yea	Yea	Yea	Yea	Yea	Yea	Yea	Yea
New York 24	Theodore M. Pomeroy	Republican	Yea	Yea	Yea	Yea	Yea	Yea	Yea	Yea	Yea	Nay	Yea
Iowa 2	Hiram Price	Republican	Yea	Yea	Yea	Yea	Yea	Yea	Yea	Yea	Yea	Absent	Yea
New York 14	John V. L. Pruyn	Democrat	Nay	Nay	Nay	Nay	Nay	Nay	Nay	Nay	Nay	Nay	Nay
Pennsylvania 1	Samuel J. Randall	Democrat	Nay	Nay	Nay	Nay	Nay	Nay	Nay	Nay	Nay	Absent	Absent
Illinois 13	Green Berry Raum	Republican	Yea	Yea	Yea	Yea	Yea	Yea	Yea	Yea	Yea	Yea	Yea
New York 10	William H. Robertson	Republican	Yea	Yea	Yea	Yea	Yea	Yea	Yea	Yea	Yea	Absent	Yea
New York 3	William Erigena Robinson	Democrat	Absent	Absent	Absent	Absent	Absent	Absent	Absent	Absent	Absent	Absent	Absent
Illinois 9	Lewis Winans Ross	Democrat	Nay	Nay	Nay	Nay	Nay	Nay	Nay	Nay	Nay	Nay	Nay
Wisconsin 5	Philetus Sawyer	Republican	Yea	Yea	Yea	Yea	Yea	Yea	Yea	Yea	Yea	Yea	Yea
Ohio 3	Robert C. Schenck	Republican	Yea	Yea	Yea	Yea	Yea	Yea	Yea	Yea	Yea	Yea	Yea
Pennsylvania 19	Glenni William Scofield	Republican	Yea	Yea	Yea	Yea	Yea	Yea	Yea	Yea	Yea	Yea	Yea
New York 28	Lewis Selye	Independent Republican	Absent	Absent	Absent	Absent	Absent	Absent	Absent	Absent	Absent	Absent	Absent
Indiana 11	John P. C. Shanks	Republican	Yea	Yea	Yea	Yea	Yea	Yea	Yea	Yea	Yea	Yea	Yea
Ohio 7	Samuel Shellabarger	Republican	Absent	Absent	Absent	Absent	Absent	Absent	Absent	Absent	Absent	Absent	Absent
New Jersey 3	Charles Sitgreaves	Democrat	Nay	Nay	Nay	Nay	Nay	Nay	Nay	Nay	Nay	Nay	Nay
Vermont 3	Worthington Curtis Smith	Republican	Yea	Yea	Yea	Yea	Yea	Yea	Yea	Yea	Yea	Nay	Yea
Ohio 18	Rufus P. Spalding	Republican	Yea	Yea	Yea	Absent	Yea	Yea	Yea	Yea	Absent	Yea	Yea
Connecticut 3	Henry H. Starkweather	Republican	Yea	Yea	Yea	Yea	Yea	Yea	Yea	Yea	Yea	Yea	Yea
New Hampshire 2	Aaron Fletcher Stevens	Republican	Absent	Absent	Absent	Absent	Absent	Absent	Absent	Absent	Absent	Absent	Absent
Pennsylvania 9	Thaddeus Stevens	Republican	Yea	Yea	Absent	Absent	Yea	Yea	Yea	Yea	Yea	Yea	Yea
New York 6	Thomas E. Stewart	Conservative Republican	Nay	Nay	Nay	Absent	Nay	Nay	Nay	Nay	Nay	Nay	Nay
Tennessee 3	William Brickly Stokes	Republican	Yea	Yea	Absent	Absent	Yea	Yea	Yea	Yea	Absent	Absent	Absent
Maryland 5	Frederick Stone	Democrat	Nay	Nay	Nay	Nay	Nay	Nay	Nay	Nay	Nay	Absent	Absent
New York 1	Stephen Taber	Democrat	Nay	Nay	Nay	Nay	Nay	Nay	Nay	Nay	Nay	Nay	Nay
Nebraska at-large	John Taffe	Republican	Yea	Yea	Yea	Yea	Yea	Yea	Yea	Yea	Yea	Yea	Yea
Pennsylvania 5	Caleb Newbold Taylor	Republican	Yea	Yea	Yea	Yea	Yea	Yea	Yea	Yea	Yea	Yea	Yea
Maryland 4	Francis Thomas	Republican	Yea	Yea	Yea	Yea	Yea	Yea	Yea	Yea	Yea	Yea	Yea
Tennessee 5	John Trimble	Republican	Yea	Yea	Yea	Yea	Yea	Yea	Yea	Yea	Yea	Absent	Absent
Kentucky 1	Lawrence S. Trimble	Democrat	Nay	Nay	Nay	Nay	Nay	Nay	Nay	Nay	Nay	Nay	Nay
Michigan 5	Rowland E. Trowbridge	Republican	Yea	Yea	Yea	Yea	Yea	Yea	Yea	Yea	Yea	Yea	Yea
Massachusetts 3	Ginery Twichell	Republican	Yea	Yea	Yea	Yea	Yea	Yea	Yea	Yea	Yea	Yea	Yea
Michigan 2	Charles Upson	Republican	Yea	Yea	Yea	Yea	Yea	Yea	Yea	Yea	Yea	Yea	Yea
New York 31	Henry Van Aernam	Republican	Yea	Yea	Yea	Yea	Yea	Yea	Yea	Yea	Yea	Yea	Yea
Pennsylvania 11	Daniel Myers Van Auken	Democrat	Nay	Nay	Nay	Nay	Nay	Nay	Nay	Nay	Nay	Absent	Absent
New York 29	Burt Van Horn	Republican	Yea	Yea	Yea	Yea	Yea	Yea	Yea	Yea	Absent	Absent	Absent
Missouri 6	Robert T. Van Horn	Republican	Yea	Yea	Yea	Yea	Yea	Yea	Yea	Yea	Yea	Yea	Yea
Ohio 12	Philadelph Van Trump	Democrat	Nay	Nay	Nay	Nay	Nay	Nay	Nay	Nay	Nay	Nay	Nay
New York 11	Charles Van Wyck	Republican	Yea	Yea	Yea	Yea	Yea	Yea	Yea	Yea	Absent	Yea	Yea
New York 27	Hamilton Ward	Republican	Yea	Yea	Yea	Yea	Yea	Yea	Yea	Yea	Yea	Yea	Yea
Wisconsin 6	Cadwallader C. Washburn	Republican	Yea	Yea	Absent	Absent	Yea	Yea	Yea	Yea	Absent	Yea	Yea
Indiana 7	Henry D. Washburn	Republican	Absent	Absent	Absent	Absent	Absent	Absent	Absent	Absent	Absent	Absent	Absent
Massachusetts 9	William B. Washburn	Republican	Yea	Yea	Yea	Yea	Yea	Yea	Yea	Yea	Yea	Yea	Yea
Illinois 3	Elihu B. Washburne	Republican	Yea	Yea	Yea	Absent	Yea	Yea	Yea	Yea	Absent	Absent	Absent
Ohio 14	Martin Welker	Republican	Yea	Yea	Yea	Yea	Yea	Yea	Yea	Yea	Yea	Yea	Yea
Pennsylvania 23	Thomas Williams	Republican	Yea	Yea	Yea	Yea	Yea	Yea	Yea	Yea	Yea	Yea	Yea
Indiana 10	William Williams	Republican	Absent	Absent	Absent	Absent	Absent	Absent	Absent	Absent	Absent	Absent	Absent
Iowa 1	James F. Wilson	Republican	Yea	Yea	Yea	Yea	Yea	Yea	Yea	Yea	Yea	Nay	Yea
Ohio 11	John Thomas Wilson	Republican	Yea	Yea	Yea	Yea	Yea	Yea	Yea	Yea	Yea	Nay	Yea
Pennsylvania 18	Stephen Fowler Wilson	Republican	Yea	Yea	Yea	Yea	Yea	Yea	Yea	Yea	Yea	Absent	Absent
Minnesota 1	William Windom	Republican	Yea	Yea	Yea	Yea	Yea	Yea	Yea	Yea	Yea	Nay	Yea
New York 9	Fernando Wood	Democrat	Nay	Nay	Nay	Nay	Nay	Nay	Nay	Nay	Nay	Nay	Nay
Vermont 1	Frederick E. Woodbridge	Republican	Yea	Yea	Yea	Absent	Yea	Yea	Yea	Yea	Absent	Nay	Yea
Pennsylvania 12	George Washington Woodward	Democrat	Nay	Nay	Nay	Nay	Nay	Nay	Nay	Nay	Nay	Absent	Absent

== Articles ==
=== Article one ===
==== Text of article one ====
That said Andrew Johnson, President of the United States, on the 21st day of February, in the year of our Lord, 1868, at Washington, in the District of Columbia, unmindful of the high duties of his oath of office and of the requirements of the Constitution, that he should take care that the laws be faithfully executed, did unlawfully, in violation of the Constitution and laws of the United States, issue an order in writing for the removal of Edwin M. Stanton from the office of Secretary of the Department of War, said Edwin M. Stanton having been, therefor, duly appointed and commissioned by and with the advice and consent of the Senate of the United States as such Secretary; and said Andrew Johnson, President of the United States, on the 12th day of August, in the year of our Lord 1867, and during the recess of said Senate, having suspended by his order Edwin M. Stanton from said office, and within twenty days after the first day of the next meeting of said Senate, on the 12th day of December, in the year last aforesaid, having reported to said Senate such suspension, with the evidence and reasons for his action in the case, and the name of the person designated to perform the duties of such office temporarily, until the next meeting of the Senate, and said Senate therafterwards, on the 13th day of January, in the year of our Lord 1868, having duly considered the evidence and reasons reported by said Andrew Johnson for said suspension, did refuse to concur in said suspension; whereby and by force of the provisions of an act entitled “an act regulating the tenure of civil officer,” passed March 2, 1867, said Edwin M. Stanton did forthwith resume the functions of his office, whereof the said Andrew Johnson had then and there notice, and the said Edwin M. Stanton, by reason of the premises, on said 21st day of February, was lawfully entitled to hold said office of Secretary for the Department of War, which said order for the removal of said Edwin M. Stanton is, in substance, as follows, that is to say:

Executive Mansion, Washington, D.C., Feb. 21, 1868.
Sir: By virtue of the power and authority vested in me, as President, by the Constitution and laws of the United States, you are hereby removed from the office of Secretary for the Department of War and your functions as such will terminate upon receipt of their communication. You will transfer to Brevet Major-General L. Thomas, Adjutant-General of the Army, who has this day been authorized and empowered to act as Secretary of War ad interim, all books, paper and other public property now in your custody and charge. Respectfully, yours,
Andrew Johnson.
To the Hon. E. M. Stanton, Secretary of War

Which order was unlawfully issued, and with intent then are there to violate the act entitled “An act regulating the tenure of certain civil office,” passed March 2, 1867, and contrary to the provisions of said act, and in violation thereof, and contrary to the provisions of the Constitution of the United States, and without the advice and consent of the Senate of the United States, the said Senate then and there being in session, to remove said E. M. Stanton from the office of Secretary for the Department of War, whereby said Andrew Johnson, President of the United States, did then and there commit, and was guilty of a high misdemeanor in office.

==== Summary of article one ====
The first article alleged that Johnson's February 21, 1868, order to dismiss Secretary of War Stanton violated the Tenure of Office Act.

==== House adoption vote for article one ====
Summary of House adoption vote for article one
	Party					Total votes
	Democratic	Republican	Conservative	Conservative Republican	Independent Republican	Total votes
Yea	0	127	0	0	0	127
Nay	40	0	0	1	1	42

Comparative bar chart
Vote	Vote total
"Yea" votes	127
"Nay" votes	42
Absent/not voting	21

==== Role of article one in the impeachment trial ====
When it came time to vote on the articles of impeachment, it was decided that article one would be skipped. This was because Republican Senator John Sherman announced that he would vote to acquit on that charge if it were brought to a vote. Since Sherman had chaired the Senate committee that had written the Tenure of Office Act, it was believed that other senators would heed his judgement and vote to acquit on this charge. Sherman did, however, declare that he would vote for articles two and three which alleged that the ad interim appointment of Thomas violated the Tenure of Office Act. Sherman did not give clear reasons for his opposition to conviction on article one nor his support for conviction on articles two and three.

=== Article two ===
==== Text of article two ====
That on the 21st day of February, in the year of our Lord 1868, at Washington, in the District of Columbia, said Andrew Johnson, President of the United States, unmindful of the high duties of his oath of office, and in violation of the Constitution of the United States, and contrary to the provisions of an act entitled “An act regulating the tenure of certain civil office,” passed March 2, 1867, without the advice and consent of the Senate, then and there being in session, and without authority of law, did appoint one L. Thomas to be Secretary of War ad interim, by issuing to said Lorenzo Thomas a letter of authority, in substance as follows, that is to say:

Executive Mansion, Washington, D.C., Feb. 21, 1868.

Sir: The Hon. Edwin M. Stanton having been this day removed from office as Secretary of the Department of War, you are hereby authorized and empowered to act as Secretary of War ad interim, and will immediately enter upon the discharge of the duties pertaining to that office. Mr. Stanton has been instructed to transfer to you all the records, books, papers and other public property now in his custody and charge. Respectfully yours,

Andrew Johnson.

To Brevet Major-General Lorenzo Thomas, Adjutant-General United States Army, Washington, D.C.

Whereby said Andrew Johnson, President of the United States, did then and there commit, and was guilty of a high misdemeanor in office.

==== Summary of article two ====
The second article charged that the appointment of Lorenzo Thomas as secretary of war ad interim was done in violation of the Tenure of Office Act. The article charged that Johnson had violated the Tenure of Office Act by sending "a letter of authority" to Lorenzo Thomas regarding his appointment to be Secretary of War ad interim when there was, in fact, no legal vacancy because Secretary Stanton had been removed in violation of the Tenure of Office Act. The second article's charge differed very little from that of the third article.

==== House adoption vote for article two ====
House adoption vote for article two
	Party					Total votes
	Democratic	Republican	Conservative	Conservative Republican	Independent Republican	Total votes
Yea	0	124	0	0	0	124
Nay	39	0	0	1	1	41

Comparative bar chart
Vote	Vote total
"Yea" votes	124
"Nay" votes	41
Absent/not voting	25

==== Senate vote on the verdict for article two ====
U.S. Senate vote on the verdict for article two (36 "guilty" votes necessary for a conviction)
May 26, 1868	Party		Total votes
May 26, 1868	Democratic	Republican	Total votes
Yea (guilty)	0	35	35
Nay (not guilty)	9	10	19
Roll call for article two verdict: Senator / Party–state / Vote; Henry B. Anthony / R–RI / Yea; James A. Bayard Jr. / D–DE / Nay; Charles R. Buckalew / D–PA / Nay; Simon Cameron / R–PA / Yea; Alexander G. Cattell / R–NJ / Yea; Zachariah Chandler / R–MI / Yea; Cornelius Cole / R–CA / Yea; Roscoe Conkling / R–NY / Yea; John Conness / R–CA / Yea; Henry W. Corbett / R–OR / Yea; Aaron H. Cragin / R–NH / Yea; Garrett Davis / D–KY / Nay; James Dixon / R–CT / Nay; James Rood Doolittle / R–WI / Nay; Charles D. Drake / R–MO / Yea; George F. Edmunds / R–VT / Yea; Orris S. Ferry / R–CT / Yea; William P. Fessenden / R–ME / Nay; Joseph S. Fowler / R–TN / Nay; Frederick T. Frelinghuysen / R–NJ / Yea; James W. Grimes / R–IA / Nay; James Harlan / R–IA / Yea; John B. Henderson / R–MO / Nay; Thomas A. Hendricks / D–IN / Nay; Jacob M. Howard / R–MI / Yea; Timothy O. Howe / R–WI / Yea; Reverdy Johnson / D–MD / Nay; Thomas C. McCreery / D–KY / Nay; Edwin D. Morgan / R–NY / Yea; Justin S. Morrill / R–VT / Yea; Lot M. Morrill / R–ME / Yea; Oliver P. Morton / R–IN / Yea; Daniel Sheldon Norton / R–MN / Nay; James W. Nye / R–NV / Yea; David T. Patterson / D–TN / Nay; James W. Patterson / R–NH / Yea; Samuel C. Pomeroy / R–KS / Yea; Alexander Ramsey / R–MN / Yea; Edmund G. Ross / R–KS / Nay; Willard Saulsbury Sr. / D–DE / Nay; John Sherman / R–OH / Yea; William Sprague IV / R–RI / Yea; William M. Stewart / R–NV / Yea; Charles Sumner / R–MA / Yea; John Milton Thayer / R–NE / Yea; Thomas Tipton / R–NE / Yea; Lyman Trumbull / R–IL / Nay; Peter G. Van Winkle / R–WV / Nay; George Vickers / D–MD / Nay; Benjamin Wade / R–OH / Yea; Waitman T. Willey / R–WV / Yea; George Henry Williams / R–OR / Yea; Henry Wilson / R–MA / Yea; Richard Yates / R–IL / Yea; Sources:

=== Article three ===
==== Text of article three ====
That said Andrew Johnson, President of the United States, on the 21st day of February, in the year of our Lord one thousand eight hundred and sixty-eight, at Washington in the District of Columbia, did commit, and was guilty of a high misdemeanor in office, in this: That without authority of law, while the Senate of the United States was then and there in session, he did appoint one Lorenzo Thomas to be Secretary for the Department of War, ad interim, without the advice and consent of the Senate, and in violation of the Constitution of the United States, no vacancy having happened in said office of Secretary for the Department of War during the recess of the Senate, and no vacancy existing in said office at the time, and which said appointment so made by Andrew Johnson of said Lorenzo Thomas is in substance as follows, that is to say:

Executive Mansion, Washington, D.C., Feb. 21, 1868.

Sir: The Hon. E. M. Stanton having been this day removed from office as Secretary for the Department of War, you are hereby authorized and empowered to act as Secretary of War ad interim, and will immediately enter upon the discharge of the duties pertaining to that office. Mr. Stanton has been instructed to transfer to you all the records, books, papers and other public property now in his custody and charge. Respectfully yours,

Andrew Johnson

To Brevet Major-General L. Thomas, Adjutant-General
United States Army, Washington, D.C.

==== Summary of article three ====
Like many of the other articles, the third article related to Johnson violating the Tenure of Office Act by attempting to dismiss Secretary of War Stanton. Like the second article, the third article alleged that the appointment of Thomas as secretary of war ad interim was done with intent to violate the Tenure of Office Act. It argued that Johnson had moved to appoint Lorenzo Thomas to be ad interim Secretary of War when there was, in fact, no legal vacancy because Secretary Stanton had been removed in violation of the Tenure of Office Act. The third article's charge differed very little from that of the second article.

==== House adoption vote for article three ====
House adoption vote for article three
	Party					Total votes
	Democratic	Republican	Conservative	Conservative Republican	Independent Republican	Total votes
Yea	1	123	0	0	0	124
Nay	38	0	0	1	1	40

Comparative bar chart
Vote	Vote total
"Yea" votes	124
"Nay" votes	40
Absent/not voting	26

==== Senate vote on the verdict for article three ====
U.S. Senate vote on the verdict for article three (36 "guilty" votes necessary for a conviction)
May 26, 1868	Party		Total votes
May 26, 1868	Democratic	Republican	Total votes
Yea (guilty)	0	35	35
Nay (not guilty)	9	10	19
Roll call for article three verdict: Senator / Party–state / Vote; Henry B. Anthony / R–RI / Yea; James A. Bayard Jr. / D–DE / Nay; Charles R. Buckalew / D–PA / Nay; Simon Cameron / R–PA / Yea; Alexander G. Cattell / R–NJ / Yea; Zachariah Chandler / R–MI / Yea; Cornelius Cole / R–CA / Yea; Roscoe Conkling / R–NY / Yea; John Conness / R–CA / Yea; Henry W. Corbett / R–OR / Yea; Aaron H. Cragin / R–NH / Yea; Garrett Davis / D–KY / Nay; James Dixon / R–CT / Nay; James Rood Doolittle / R–WI / Nay; Charles D. Drake / R–MO / Yea; George F. Edmunds / R–VT / Yea; Orris S. Ferry / R–CT / Yea; William P. Fessenden / R–ME / Nay; Joseph S. Fowler / R–TN / Nay; Frederick T. Frelinghuysen / R–NJ / Yea; James W. Grimes / R–IA / Nay; James Harlan / R–IA / Yea; John B. Henderson / R–MO / Nay; Thomas A. Hendricks / D–IN / Nay; Jacob M. Howard / R–MI / Yea; Timothy O. Howe / R–WI / Yea; Reverdy Johnson / D–MD / Nay; Thomas C. McCreery / D–KY / Nay; Edwin D. Morgan / R–NY / Yea; Justin S. Morrill / R–VT / Yea; Lot M. Morrill / R–ME / Yea; Oliver P. Morton / R–IN / Yea; Daniel Sheldon Norton / R–MN / Nay; James W. Nye / R–NV / Yea; David T. Patterson / D–TN / Nay; James W. Patterson / R–NH / Yea; Samuel C. Pomeroy / R–KS / Yea; Alexander Ramsey / R–MN / Yea; Edmund G. Ross / R–KS / Nay; Willard Saulsbury Sr. / D–DE / Nay; John Sherman / R–OH / Yea; William Sprague IV / R–RI / Yea; William M. Stewart / R–NV / Yea; Charles Sumner / R–MA / Yea; John Milton Thayer / R–NE / Yea; Thomas Tipton / R–NE / Yea; Lyman Trumbull / R–IL / Nay; Peter G. Van Winkle / R–WV / Nay; George Vickers / D–MD / Nay; Benjamin Wade / R–OH / Yea; Waitman T. Willey / R–WV / Yea; George Henry Williams / R–OR / Yea; Henry Wilson / R–MA / Yea; Richard Yates / R–IL / Yea; Sources:

=== Article four ===
==== Text of article four ====
That said Andrew Johnson, President of the United States, unmindful of the high duties of his office, and of his oath of office, in violation of the Constitution and laws of the United States, on the 21st day of February, in the year of our Lord 1868, at Washington, in the District of Columbia, did unlawfully conspire with one Lorenzo Thomas, and with other persons to the House of Representatives unknown, with intent, by intimidation and threats, to hinder and prevent Edwin M. Stanton, then and there, the Secretary for the Department of War, duly appointed under the laws of the United States, from holding said office of Secretary for the Department of War, contrary to and in violation of the Constitution of the United States, and of the provisions of an act entitled "An act to define and punish certain conspiracies," approved July 31, 1861, whereby said Andrew Johnson, President of the United States, did then and there commit and was guilty of high crime in office.

==== Summary of article four ====
The fourth article, like many of the other articles, related to Johnson violating the Tenure of Office Act by attempting to dismiss Secretary of War Stanton. Like articles five, six, seven, and eight, it also alleged conspiracy. It alleged that Johnson had violated the 1861 federal conspiracy statute by working with Lorenzo Thomas and others to oust Secretary Stanton, obstructing him from being able to carry out the duties of his office as secretary of war.

==== House adoption vote for article four ====
House adoption vote for article four
	Party					Total votes
	Democratic	Republican	Conservative	Conservative Republican	Independent Republican	Total votes
Yea	1	116	0	0	0	117
Nay	39	0	0	0	1	40

Comparative bar chart
Vote	Vote total
"Yea" votes	117
"Nay" votes	40
Absent/not voting	33

=== Article five ===
==== Text of article five ====
That said Andrew Johnson, President of the United States, unmindful of the high duties of his office and of his oath of office, on the 21st of February, in the year of our Lord one thousand eight hundred and sixty-eight, and on divers other days and time in said year before the 28th day of said February, at Washington, in the District of Columbia, did unlawfully conspire with one Lorenzo Thomas, and with other persons in the House of Representatives unknown, by force to prevent and hinder the execution of an act entitled “An act regulating the tenure of certain civil office,” passed March 2, 1867, and in pursuance of said conspiracy, did attempt to prevent E. M. Stanton, then and there being Secretary for the Department of War, duly appointed and commissioned under the laws of the United States, from holding said office, whereby the said Andrew Johnson, President of the United States, did then and there commit and was guilty of high misdemeanor in office.

==== Summary of article five ====
Like many of the other articles, the article five related to Johnson violating the Tenure of Office Act by attempting to dismiss Secretary of War Stanton. Similar to article four, article five dealt with Johnson allegedly conspiring with Thomas to oust Stanton. It specifically charged that Johnson had, with Thomas, used force to "prevent and hinder the execution" of the Tenure of Office Act by ousting Secretary Stanton.

==== House adoption vote for article five ====
House adoption vote for article five
	Party					Total votes
	Democratic	Republican	Conservative	Conservative Republican	Independent Republican	Total votes
Yea	0	127	0	0	0	127
Nay	40	0	0	1	1	42

Comparative bar chart
Vote	Vote total
"Yea" votes	127
"Nay" votes	42
Absent/not voting	21

=== Article six ===
==== Text of article six ====
That Andrew Johnson, President of the United States, unmindful of the duties of his high office and of his oath of office, on the 21st day of February, in the year of our Lord 1868, at Washington, in the District of Columbia, did unlawfully conspire with one Lorenzo Thomas, by force to seize, take and possess the property of the United States at the War Department, contrary to the provisions of an act entitled “An act to define and punish certain conspiracies,” approved July 31, 1861, and with intent to violate and disregard an act entitled “An act regulating the tenure of certain civil offices,” passed March 2, 1867, whereby said Andrew Johnson, President of the United States, did then and there commit a high crime in office.

==== Summary of article six ====
Like many of the other articles, article six related to Johnson violating the Tenure of Office Act by attempting to dismiss Secretary of War Stanton. The article alleged that Johnson and Lorenzo Johnson had conspired to oust Stanton and to forcefully seize the property of the United States Department of War. It charged that this was a violation of both the 1861 federal conspiracy statute and the Tenure of Office Act. Article seven effectively alleged the same conspiracy as article six, but without the allegation of a use of force.

==== House adoption vote for article six ====
House adoption vote for article six
	Party					Total votes
	Democratic	Republican	Conservative	Conservative Republican	Independent Republican	Total votes
Yea	0	127	0	0	0	127
Nay	40	0	0	1	1	42

Comparative bar chart
Vote	Vote total
"Yea" votes	127
"Nay" votes	42
Absent/not voting	21

=== Article seven ===
==== Text of article seven ====
That said Andrew Johnson, President of the United States, unmindful of the high duties of his office, and of his oath of office, on the 21st day of February, in the year of our Lord 1868, and on divers other days in said year, before the 28th day of said February, at Washington, in the District of Columbia, did unlawfully conspire with one Lorenzo Thomas to prevent and hinder the execution of an act of the United States, entitled “An act regulating the tenure of certain civil office,” passed March 2, 1867, and in pursuance of said conspiracy, did unlawfully attempt to prevent Edwin M. Stanton, then and there being Secretary for the Department of War, under the laws of the United States, from holding said office to which he had been duly appointed and commissioned, whereby said Andrew Johnson, President of the United States, did there and then commit and was guilty of a high misdemeanor in office.

==== Summary of article seven ====
Article seven, like many of the other articles, relates to Johnson violating the Tenure of Office Act by attempting to dismiss Secretary of War Stanton. Article seven alleges that Johnson and Lorenzo Thomas had conspired to oust Stanton; acting "by force to seize, take, and possess the property of the United States in the Department of War" under control of Stanton, thereby committing a high misdemeanor in office by acting in violation of both the Tenure of Office Act. Article seven effectively alleged the same conspiracy as article six, but without the allegation of a use of force.

==== House adoption vote for article seven ====
House adoption vote for article seven
	Party					Total votes
	Democratic	Republican	Conservative	Conservative Republican	Independent Republican	Total votes
Yea	0	127	0	0	0	127
Nay	40	0	0	1	1	42

Comparative bar chart
Vote	Vote total
"Yea" votes	127
"Nay" votes	42
Absent/not voting	21

=== Article eight ===
==== Text of article eight ====
That said Andrew Johnson, President of the United States, unmindful of the high duties of his office, and of his oath of office, on the 21st day of February, in the year of our Lord, 1868, at Washington, in the District of Columbia, did unlawfully conspire with one Lorenzo Thomas, to seize, take and possess the property of the United States in the War Department, with intent to violate and disregard the act entitled “An act regulating the tenure of certain civil office,” passed March 2, 1867, whereby said Andrew Johnson, President of the United States, did then and there commit a high misdemeanor in office.

==== Summary of article eight ====
Article eight charged that Johnson had unlawfully sought to seize the property of the Department of War by moving to remove Secretary Stanton and appoint Lorenzo Thomas. The article was like many others in that it related to Johnson violating the Tenure of Office Act by attempting to dismiss Secretary of War Stanton. However, its allegation that the appointment of Thomas ad interim was done with the intent of unlawfully controlling property of the Department of War was unique among the articles of impeachment.

==== House adoption vote for article eight ====
House adoption vote for article eight
	Party					Total votes
	Democratic	Republican	Conservative	Conservative Republican	Independent Republican	Total votes
Yea	0	127	0	0	0	127
Nay	40	0	0	1	1	42

Comparative bar chart
Vote	Vote total
"Yea" votes	127
"Nay" votes	42
Absent/not voting	21

=== Article nine ===
==== Text of article nine ====
That said Andrew Johnson, President of the United States, on the 22nd day of February, in the year of our Lord 1868, at Washington, in the District of Columbia, in disregard of the Constitution and the law of Congress duly enacted, as Commander-in-Chief, did bring before himself, then and there, William H. Emory, a Major-General by brevet in the Army of the United States, actually in command of the Department of Washington, and the military forces therefor, and did and there, as Commander-in-Chief, declare to, and instruct said Emory, that part of the law of the United States, passed March 2, 1867, entitled “an act for making appropriations for the support of the army for the year ending June 30, 1868, and for other purposes,” especially the second section thereof, which provides, among other things, that all orders and instructions relating to military operations issued by the President and Secretary of War, shall be issued through the General of the Army, and in case of his inability, through the next in rank was unconstitutional, and in contravention of the commission of Emory, and therefore not binding on him, as an officer in the Army of the United States, which said provisions of law had been therefore duly and legally promulgated by General Order for the government and direction of the Army of the United States, as the said Andrew Johnson then and there well knew, with intent thereby to induce said Emory, in his official capacity as Commander of the Department of Washington, to violate the provisions of said act, and to take and receive, act upon and obey such orders as he, the said Andrew Johnson, might make and give, and which should not be issued through the General of the Army of the United States, according to the provisions of said act, whereby said Andrew Johnson, President of the United States, did then and there commit, and was guilty of a high misdemeanor in office; and the House of Representatives, by protestation, saving to themselves the liberty of exhibition, at any time hereafter, any further articles of their accusation or impeachment against the said Andrew Johnson, President of the United States, and also or replying to his answers, which will make up the articles herein preferred against him, and of offering proof to the same and every part thereof, and to all and every other article, accusation or impeachment which shall be exhibited by them as the case shall require, do demand that the said Andrew Johnson may be put to answer the high crimes and misdemeanors in office herein charged against him, and that such proceedings, examinations, trials and judgments may be thereupon had and given had and given as may be agreeable to law and justice.

==== Summary of article nine ====
The ninth article focused on charging that Johnson had violated the Command of Army Act by unlawfully instructing Major General William H. Emory to ignore as unconstitutional act, which required that all orders issued by the President and Secretary of War "relating to military operations ... shall be issued through the General of the Army". This article was not supported by the testimony of Emory.

==== House adoption vote for article nine ====
House adoption vote for article nine
	Party					Total votes
	Democratic	Republican	Conservative	Conservative Republican	Independent Republican	Total votes
Yea	0	108	0	0	0	108
Nay	39	0	0	1	1	41

=== Article ten ===
Unlike the first nine article of impeachment, the tenth article was not written by the select committee that had been appointed for the express purpose of writing article of impeachment. Instead, it was individually authored by Congressman Benjamin Butler, who did not serve on that select committee. It was initially rejected by the House when Butler presented it on March 2, 1868, but was passed the following day at the request of the impeachment managers.

Butler had, when first presenting the article on March 2, 1868, argued that it was similar to one of the articles impeachment adopted against sixty years earlier against Supreme Court Justice Samuel Chase.

==== Text of article ten ====
That said Andrew Johnson, President of the United States, unmindful of the high duties of his high office and the dignity and proprieties thereof, and of the harmony and courtesies which ought to exist and be maintained between the executive and legislative branches of the Government of the United States, designing and intending to set aside the rightful authorities and powers of Congress, did attempt to bring into disgrace, ridicule, hatred, contempt and reproach, the Congress of the United States, and the several branches thereof, to impair and destroy the regard and respect of all the good people of the United States for the Congress and the legislative power thereof, which all officers of the government ought inviolably to preserve and maintain, and to excite the odium and resentment of all good people of the United States against Congress and the laws by it duly and constitutionally enacted; and in pursuance of his said design and intent, openly and publicly and before divers assemblages of citizens of the United States, convened in divers parts thereof, to meet and receive said Andrew Johnson as the Chief Magistrate of the United States, did, on the eighteenth day of August, in the year of our Lord one thousand eight hundred and sixty-six, and on divers other days and times, as well before as afterwards, make and declare, with a loud voice, certain intemperate, inflammatory and scandalous harangues, and therein utter loud threats and bitter menaces, as well against Congress as the laws of the United States duly enacted thereby, amid the cries, jeers and laughter of the multitudes then assembled in hearing, which are set forth in the several specifications hereinafter written, in substance and effect, that it to say:

"Specification First. In this, that at Washington, in the District of Columbia, In the Executive Mansion, to a committee of citizens who called upon the President of the United States, speaking of and concerning the Congress of the United States, heretofore, to wit: On the 18th day of August, in the year of our Lord, 1866, in a loud voice, declare in substance and effect, among other things, that is to say:

"So far as the Executive Department of the government is concerned, the effort has been made to restore the Union, to heal the breach, to pour oil into the wounds which were consequent upon the struggle, and, to speak in a common phrase, to prepare, as the learned and wise physician would, a plaster healing in character and co-extensive with the wound. We thought and we think that we had partially succeeded, but as the work progresses, as reconstruction seemed to be taking place, and the country was becoming reunited, we found a disturbing and moving element opposing it. In alluding to that element it shall go no further than your Convention, and the distinguished gentleman who has delivered the report of the proceedings, I shall make no reference that I do not believe, and the time and the occasion justify. We have witnessed in one department of the government every endeavor to prevent the restoration of peace, harmony and union. We have seen hanging upon the verge of the government, as it were, a body called or which assumes to be the Congress of the United States, while in fact it is a Congress of only part of the States. We have seen this Congress pretend to be for the Union, when its every step and act tended to perpetuate disunion and make a disruption of States inevitable. We have seen Congress gradually encroach, step by step, upon constitutional rights, and violate day after day, and month after month, fundamental principles of the government. We have seen a Congress that seemed to forget that there was a limit to the sphere and scope of legislation. We have seen a Congress in a minority assume to exercise power which, if allowed to be consummated, would result in despotism or monarchy itself."

"Specification Second. In this, that at Cleveland, in the State of Ohio, heretofore to wit: On the third day of September, in the year of our Lord, 1866, before a public assemblage of citizens and others, said Andrew Johnson, President of the United States, speaking of and concerning the Congress of the United States, did, in a loud voice, declare in substance and effect, among other things, that is to say:

"Go on; perhaps if you had a word or two on the subject of New Orleans you might understand more about it than you do, and if you will go back and ascertain the cause of the riot at New Orleans, perhaps you will not be so prompt in calling out “New Orleans.” If you will take up the riot of New Orleans and trace it back to its source and its immediate cause, you will find out who was responsible for the blood that was shed there. If you will take up the riot at New Orleans and trace it back to the Radical Congress, you will find that the riot at New Orleans was substantially planned. If you will take up the proceedings in their caucuses you will understand that they knew that a convention was to be called which was extinct by its powers having expired; that it was said that the intention was that a new government was to be organized, and on the organization of that government the intention was to enfranchise one portion of the population, called the colored population, and who had been emancipated, and at the same time disfranchise white men. When you design to talk about New Orleans you ought to understand what you are talking about. When you read the speeches that were made, and take up the facts on the Friday and Saturday before that convention sat, you will find that speeches were made incendiary in their character, exciting that portion of the population, the black population, to arm themselves and prepare for the shedding of blood. You will also find that convention did assemble in violation of law, and the intention of that convention was to supersede the organized authorities in the State of Louisiana, which had been organized by the government of the United States, and every man engaged in that rebellion, in the convention, with the intention of superseding and upturning the civil government which had been recognized by the Government of the United States, I say that he was a traitor to the Constitution of the United States, and hence you find that another rebellion was commenced, having its origin in the Radical Congress. So much for the New Orleans riot. And there was the cause and the origin of the blood that was shed, and every drop of blood that was shed is upon their skirts and they are responsible. I could test this thing a little closer, but will not do it here to-night. But when you talk about the causes and consequences that resulted from proceedings of that kind, perhaps, as I have been introduced here and you have provoked questions of this kind, though it does not provoke me, I will tell you a few wholesome things that have been done by this Radical Congress in connection with New Orleans and the extension of the elective franchise. I know that I have been traduced and abused. I know it has come in advance of me here, as elsewhere, that I have attempted to exercise an arbitrary power in resisting laws that were intended to be forced upon the government; that I had exercised that power; that I had abandoned the party that elected me, and that I was a traitor, because I exercised the veto power in attempting, and did arrest for a time, that which was called a “Freedmen’s Bureau” bill. Yes, that I was a traitor. And I have been traduced; I have been slandered; I have been maligned; I have been called Judas Iscariot, and all that. Now, my countrymen, here to-night, it is very easy to indulge in epithets; it is easy to call a man a Judas, and cry out traitor, but when he is called upon to give arguments and facts he is very often found wanting. Judas Iscariot? Judas! There was a Judas, and he was one of the twelve Apostles. O, yes, the twelve Apostles had a Christ, and he never could have had a Judas unless he had twelve Apostles. If I have played the Judas who has been my Christ that I have played the Judas with? Was it Thad. Stevens? Was it Wendell Phillips? Was it Charles Sumner? They are the men that stop and compare themselves with the Savior, and everybody that differs with them in opinion, and tries to stay and arrest their diabolical and nefarious policy is to be denounced as a Judas. Well, let me say to you, if you will stand by me in this action, if you will stand by me in trying to give the people a fair chance, soldiers and citizens, to participate in these office, God be willing, I will kick them out. I will kick them out just as fast as I can. Let me say to you, in concluding, that what I have said is what I intended to say; I was not provoked into this, and care not for their menaces, the taunts and the jeers. I care not for threats, I do not intend to be bullied by enemies, nor overawed by my friends. But, God willing, with your help, I will veto their measures whenever any of them come to me."

"Which said utterances, declarations, threats and harangues, highly censurable in any, are peculiarly indecent and unbecoming in the Chief Magistrate of the United States, by means whereof the said Andrew Johnson has brought the high office of the President of the United States into contempt, ridicule and disgrace, to the great scandal of all good citizens, whereby said Andrew Johnson, President of the United States, did commit, and was then and there guilty of a high misdemeanor in office.

==== Summary of article ten ====
Article ten deals with remarks made by Johnson during the Swing Around the Circle. It charged that Johnson had attempted, "to bring into disgrace, ridicule, hatred, contempt, and reproach the Congress of the United States." It alleged that he had "with a loud voice, certain intemperate, inflammatory, and scandalous harangues, and did therein utter loud threats and bitter menaces ... against Congress [and] the laws of the United States duly enacted thereby, amid the cries, jeers and laughter of the multitudes then assembled and within hearing." The tenth article did not cite a clear violation of the law.

==== House rejection on March 2, 1868 ====
Vote on article after it was introduced by Benjamin Butler on March 2, 1868
	Total votes
Yea	48
Nay	74

Comparative bar chart
Vote	Vote total
"Yea" votes	48
"Nay" votes	74
Absent/not voting	68

==== House adoption vote for article ten ====
House adoption vote for article ten (March 3, 1868)
	Party					Total votes
	Democratic	Republican	Conservative	Conservative Republican	Independent Republican	Total votes
Yea	0	88	0	0	0	88
Nay	31	12	0	1	1	45

Comparative bar chart
Vote	Vote total
"Yea" votes	88
"Nay" votes	45
Absent/not voting	57

==== Role of article ten in the impeachment trial ====
Several witnesses were brought in during the impeachment managers' prosecutorial presentation to testify on the speeches cited in the tenth article of impeachment. Several individuals, largely reporters, testified about the cited speeches by Johnson. For instance, James O. Clephane and others were called by the prosecution to testify on the speech that Johnson had made in Washington, D.C., on August 18, 1866. Clephane, who had at the time of the speech made a report on it as a phonographic reporter, testified with other witnesses that the wording of their reports had been corrected by the president's private secretary, Colonel W. G. Moore. In his testimony, Moore testified that the corrections made by him were corrections he had made without the approval of Johnson, and only related to the language used, and did not change the sense of the reports. During the defense's presentation, witnesses were also called to testify about the cited speeches. For example, William W. Armstrong, then a reporter for The Plain Dealer, testified about Johnson's speech in Cleveland, with the defense aiming to prove that Johnson was constantly interrupted by the crowd during that speech and that many disorderly individuals were in the audience. Others were called by the defense to testify about other speeches that were cited in article ten.

=== Article eleven ===
==== Text of article eleven ====
That the said Andrew Johnson, President of the United States, unmindful of the high duties of his office and his oath of office, and in disregard of the Constitution and laws of the United States, did, heretofore, to wit: On the 18th day of August, 1866, at the city of Washington, and in the District of Columbia, by public speech, declare and affirm in substance, that the Thirty-ninth Congress of the United States was not a Congress of the United States authorized by the Constitution to exercise legislative power under the same, but on the contrary, was a Congress of only part of the States, thereby denying and intending to deny, that the legislation of said Congress was valid or obligatory upon him, the said Andrew Johnson, except in so far as he saw fit to approve the same, and also thereby denying the power of the said Thirty-ninth Congress to propose amendments to the Constitution of the United States. And in pursuance of said declaration, the said Andrew Johnson, President of the United States, afterwards, to wit: On the 21st day of February 1868, at the city of Washington, D.C., did, unlawfully and in disregard of the requirements of the Constitution that he should take care that the laws be faithfully executed, attempt to prevent the execution of an act entitled “An act regulating the tenure of certain civil office,” passed March 2, 1867, by unlawfully devising and contriving and attempting to devise and contrive means by which he should prevent Edwin M. Stanton from forthwith resuming the functions of the office of Secretary for the Department of War, notwithstanding the refusal of the Senate to concur in the suspension theretofore made by the said Andrew Johnson of said Edwin M. Stanton from said office of Secretary for the Department of War; and also by further unlawfully devising and contriving, and attempting to devise and contrive means then and there to prevent the execution of an act entitled “An act making appropriations for the support of the army for the fiscal year ending June 30, 1868, and for other purposes,” approved March 20, 1867. And also to prevent the execution of an act entitled “An act to provide for the more efficient government of the Rebel States,” passed March 2, 1867. Whereby the said Andrew Johnson, President of the United States, did then, to wit, on the 21st day of February, 1868, at the city of Washington, commit and was guilty of a high misdemeanor in office.

==== Summary of article eleven ====
The eleventh article effectively provided a restatement of the first nine articles. Like the first eight articles, the eleventh article related to Johnson violating the Tenure of Office Act by attempting to dismiss Secretary of War Stanton. It also charged Johnson of violating his oath of office to "take care that the laws be faithfully executed" by unlawfully and unconstitutionally challenging the authority of the 39th Congress to legislate due to unreconstructed southern states had not been readmitted to the Union. It also charged that Johnson had contrived to fail to execute the provision of the Command of Army Act, a provision 1867 Army Appropriations Act which directed executive orders to the military be issued through the General of the Army; and prevented the execution of an act entitled "An act to provide for the more efficient government of the rebel states". This meant that this article combined the alleged criminal offense related to Johnson's effort to dismiss Stanton was combined with a political offense. The article also accused Johnson of acting to prevent the execution of “An act to provide for the more efficient government of the Rebel States,” a piece of legislation relating to the unreconstructed states, and also included the allegation that Johnson had violated the Command of Army Act.

It was hoped by the impeachment managers that the article might succeed if others failed by amalgamating many of the various allegations featured in other articles, with the theory being that senators who accepted one charge but not others would all vote for a single resolution combining those charges. In no preceding United States federal impeachments had there been a similar "catch-all" article of impeachment combining many allegations into one article. However, some of the subsequent federal impeachments have featured similar articles combining multiple allegations into a single article.

==== House adoption vote for article eleven ====
House adoption vote for article eleven
	Party					Total votes
	Democratic	Republican	Conservative	Conservative Republican	Independent Republican	Total votes
Yea	0	109	0	0	0	109
Nay	30	0	0	1	1	32

Comparative bar chart
Vote	Vote total
"Yea" votes	109
"Nay" votes	32
Absent/not voting	58

==== Senate vote on the verdict for article eleven ====
U.S. Senate vote on the verdict for article eleven (36 "guilty" votes necessary for a conviction)
May 16, 1868	Party		Total votes
May 16, 1868	Democratic	Republican	Total votes
Yea (guilty)	0	35	35
Nay (not guilty)	9	10	19
Roll call for article six verdict: Senator / Party–state / Vote; Henry B. Anthony / R–RI / Yea; James A. Bayard Jr. / D–DE / Nay; Charles R. Buckalew / D–PA / Nay; Simon Cameron / R–PA / Yea; Alexander G. Cattell / R–NJ / Yea; Zachariah Chandler / R–MI / Yea; Cornelius Cole / R–CA / Yea; Roscoe Conkling / R–NY / Yea; John Conness / R–CA / Yea; Henry W. Corbett / R–OR / Yea; Aaron H. Cragin / R–NH / Yea; Garrett Davis / D–KY / Nay; James Dixon / R–CT / Nay; James Rood Doolittle / R–WI / Nay; Charles D. Drake / R–MO / Yea; George F. Edmunds / R–VT / Yea; Orris S. Ferry / R–CT / Yea; William P. Fessenden / R–ME / Nay; Joseph S. Fowler / R–TN / Nay; Frederick T. Frelinghuysen / R–NJ / Yea; James W. Grimes / R–IA / Nay; James Harlan / R–IA / Yea; John B. Henderson / R–MO / Nay; Thomas A. Hendricks / D–IN / Nay; Jacob M. Howard / R–MI / Yea; Timothy O. Howe / R–WI / Yea; Reverdy Johnson / D–MD / Nay; Thomas C. McCreery / D–KY / Nay; Edwin D. Morgan / R–NY / Yea; Justin S. Morrill / R–VT / Yea; Lot M. Morrill / R–ME / Yea; Oliver P. Morton / R–IN / Yea; Daniel Sheldon Norton / R–MN / Nay; James W. Nye / R–NV / Yea; David T. Patterson / D–TN / Nay; James W. Patterson / R–NH / Yea; Samuel C. Pomeroy / R–KS / Yea; Alexander Ramsey / R–MN / Yea; Edmund G. Ross / R–KS / Nay; Willard Saulsbury Sr. / D–DE / Nay; John Sherman / R–OH / Yea; William Sprague IV / R–RI / Yea; William M. Stewart / R–NV / Yea; Charles Sumner / R–MA / Yea; John Milton Thayer / R–NE / Yea; Thomas Tipton / R–NE / Yea; Lyman Trumbull / R–IL / Nay; Peter G. Van Winkle / R–WV / Nay; George Vickers / D–MD / Nay; Benjamin Wade / R–OH / Yea; Waitman T. Willey / R–WV / Yea; George Henry Williams / R–OR / Yea; Henry Wilson / R–MA / Yea; Richard Yates / R–IL / Yea; Sources:

== Notes ==
- ^α Schuyler Colfax was serving as Speaker of the House. Per House rules, "the Speaker is not required to vote in ordinary legislative proceedings, except when such vote would be decisive or when the House is engaged in voting by ballot."
