= Jeremiah S. Black =

American judge (1810–1883)

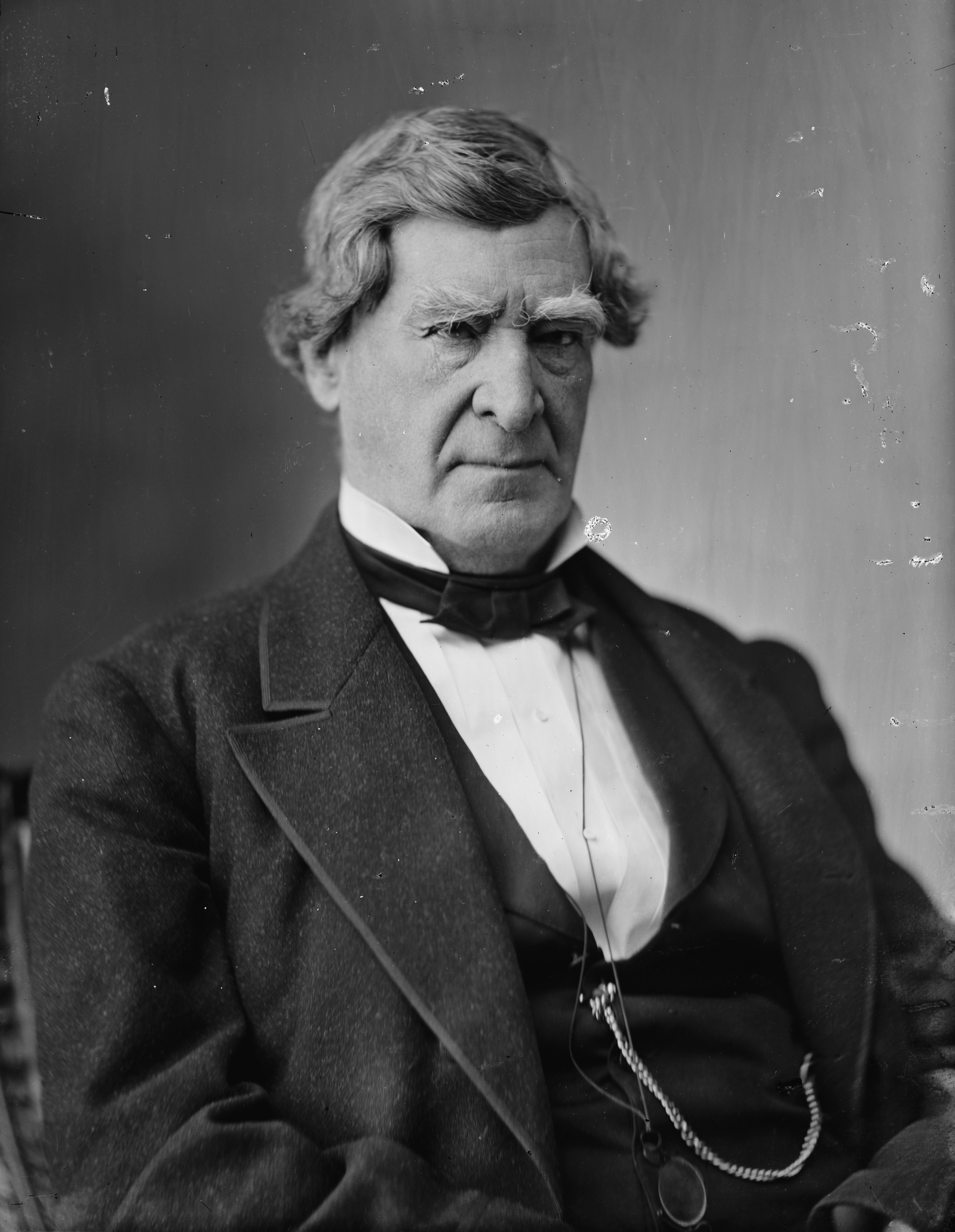
- Portrait c. 1870–1880

6th United States Supreme Court Reporter
- In office 1861–1862
- Preceded by: Benjamin Howard
- Succeeded by: John Wallace

23rd United States Secretary of State
- In office December 17, 1860 – March 5, 1861
- President: James Buchanan; Abraham Lincoln
- Preceded by: Lewis Cass
- Succeeded by: William Seward

24th United States Attorney General
- In office March 6, 1857 – December 16, 1860
- President: James Buchanan
- Preceded by: Caleb Cushing
- Succeeded by: Edwin Stanton

Chief Justice of the Pennsylvania Supreme Court
- In office December 1, 1851 – November 13, 1854
- Preceded by: John Bannister Gibson
- Succeeded by: Ellis Lewis

Associate Justice of the Pennsylvania Supreme Court
- In office December 1, 1851 – March 6, 1857
- Preceded by: Thomas Burnside
- Succeeded by: James Armstrong

Personal details
- Born: Jeremiah Sullivan Black; January 10, 1810 Stony Creek, Pennsylvania, U.S. (new Glades)
- Died: August 19, 1883 (aged 73) York, Pennsylvania, U.S.
- Party: Democratic
- Spouse: Mary Forward (1836–1883)
- Children: 4, including Chauncey

Jeremiah Sullivan Black (January 10, 1810 – August 19, 1883) was an American statesman and lawyer. He served as a justice on the Supreme Court of Pennsylvania (1851–1857) and as the Court's Chief Justice (1851–1854). He also served in the Cabinet of President James Buchanan, first as Attorney General (1857–1860), and then Secretary of State (1860–1861).

== Early life ==
Jeremiah S. Black was born on January 10, 1810, in Stony Creek, Pennsylvania, near Dauphin, Pennsylvania. He was the son of Representative Henry Black and Mary (Sullivan) Black. Jeremiah Black was largely self-educated before beginning to study law with Chauncey Forward. He was admitted to the Pennsylvania bar before he was 21. He gradually became one of the leading American lawyers, and was a member of the Pennsylvania Supreme Court (1851–1857), serving as Chief Justice (1851–1854).

== James Buchanan's Cabinet (1857–1861) ==
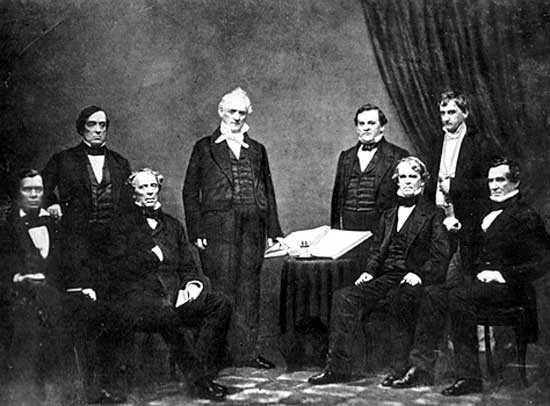
The Buchanan Cabinet, c. 1859: (From left to right) Jacob Thompson, Lewis Cass, John B. Floyd, James Buchanan, Howell Cobb, Isaac Toucey, Joseph Holt, and Jeremiah Black

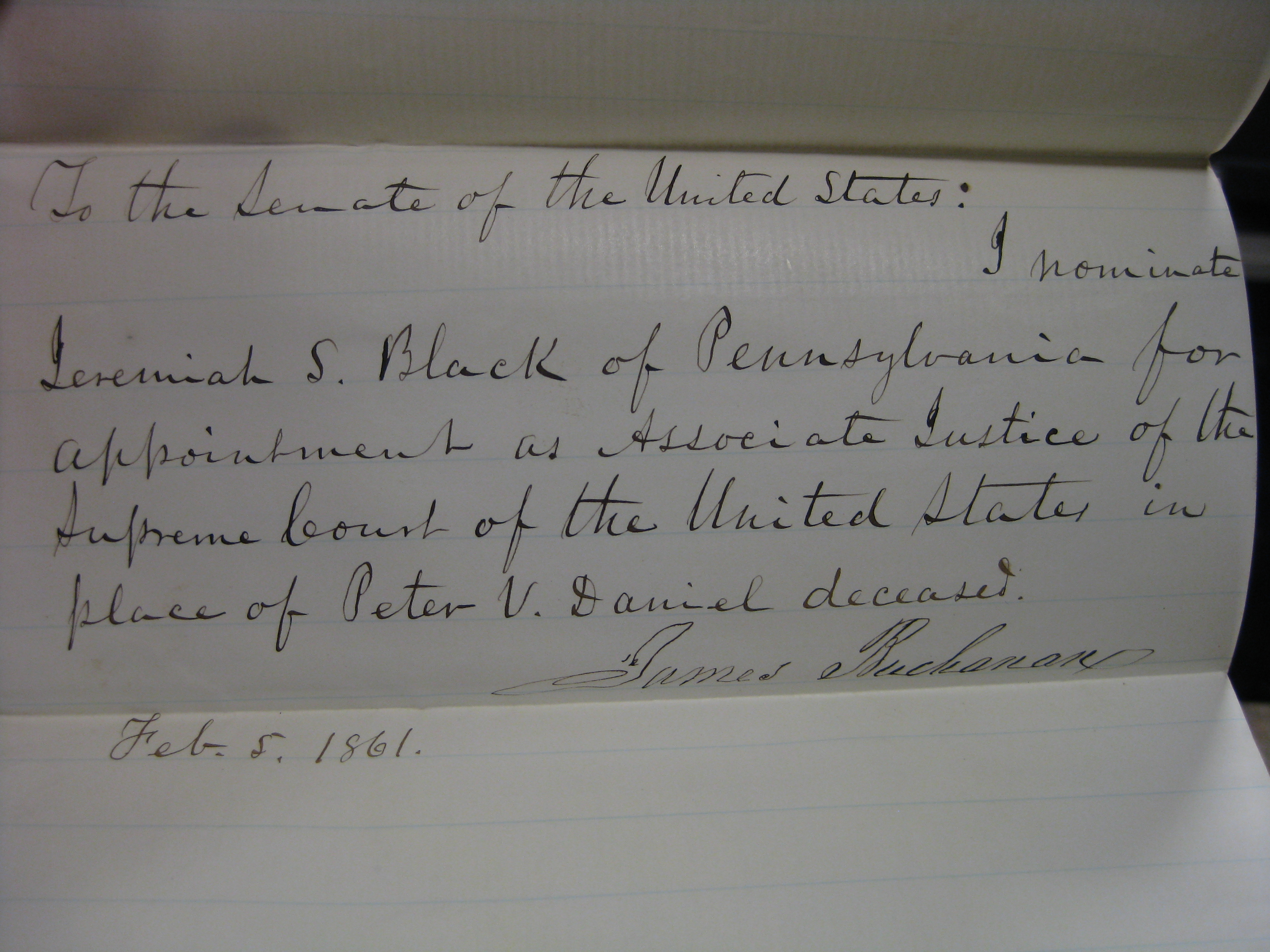
President Buchanan's 1861 letter nominating Black to the U.S. Supreme Court

In 1857, he joined the administration of James Buchanan as the Attorney General. In this capacity, he successfully contested the validity of the California land claims to about 19,000 square miles (49,000 km^{2}) of land, fraudulently alleged to have been granted to land-grabbers and others by the Mexican government prior to the close of the Mexican–American War.

When Secretary of State Lewis Cass resigned in December 1860, Black was appointed to replace him, serving from December 17, 1860, to the end of Buchanan's term on March 4, 1861. Black successfully urged the appointment of Edwin M. Stanton as his successor as Attorney General.

Black was perhaps the most influential of President Buchanan's official advisers too, during the secession crisis. He denied the constitutionality of secession, and urged that Fort Sumter be properly reinforced and defended. However, he argued that a state could not be legally coerced by the Federal government.

On February 5, 1861, President Buchanan nominated him for a seat on the Supreme Court of the United States; but a February 21 motion to proceed to consider the nomination was defeated 25–26, and it lapsed at the end of the 36th Congress. Subsequently, Black was named Reporter of Decisions of the Supreme Court of the United States, a position he held for two years. After publishing the reports for 1861 and 1862 (U.S. 66–67), he resigned and devoted himself almost exclusively to his private law practice.

== Later life ==
After the Civil War, he vigorously opposed the Congressional plan for Reconstruction and drafted President Andrew Johnson's message vetoing the Reconstruction Act passed on March 2, 1867; the veto was overridden. Black was also briefly part of the president's defense team at the outset of his 1868 impeachment trial before the United States Senate.

From 1866 to 1868, Black sought U.S. recognition of his clients' Guano Islands Act claim on Alto Velo Island, which was disputed by the Dominican Republic.

Later, from 1869 to 1876, Black served with Montgomery Blair and Matthew H. Carpenter as Counsel for U.S. Secretary of War William W. Belknap, who in 1876 was impeached on a charge of corruption. Black also represented Samuel J. Tilden during the contest for the presidency between Tilden and Rutherford B. Hayes. He died on August 19, 1883, at the age of 73, and was buried at Prospect Hill Cemetery in York, Pennsylvania.

== Family ==
On March 23, 1836, Black married the former Mary Forward. They had four children, Rebekah Black, Chauncey Black, Henry Black, Jr., and Mary Sullivan Black.

Legal offices
Preceded by John Bannister Gibson	Chief Justice of the Pennsylvania Supreme Court; 1851–1854	Succeeded by Ellis Lewis
Preceded by	Associate Justice of the Pennsylvania Supreme Court; 1854–1857	Succeeded by James Armstrong
Preceded by Caleb Cushing	United States Attorney General; 1857–1860	Succeeded by Edwin Stanton
Preceded by Benjamin Howard	United States Supreme Court Reporter of Decisions; 1861–1862	Succeeded by John Wallace
Political offices
Preceded by Lewis Cass	United States Secretary of State; 1860–1861	Succeeded by William Seward
