= Justice Armstrong =

Justice Armstrong may refer to:

- Iain Armstrong, Lord Armstrong (born 1956), justice of the Supreme Courts of Scotland
- James Armstrong (Pennsylvania judge) (1794–1867), justice of the Supreme Court of Pennsylvania
- James Sherrard Armstrong (1821–1888), chief justice for the colony of Saint Lucia and chief justice of Tobago

== See also ==
- Judge Armstrong (disambiguation)
