= Command of Army Act =

Federal United States law

The Command of Army Act is a law that was in effect under the 1867–1868 appropriations act for the United States Army. The appropriations act under which the law was in place had been passed by the United States Congress on March 2, 1867, and signed by President Andrew Johnson on March 4, 1867. It was one of several pieces of legislation that the United States Congress passed to curb the powers of Andrew Johnson as president of the United States. The Congress' efforts to curb Johnson's powers was motivated by tensions over reconstruction, with Johnson being regarded as an obstructor of the Republican supermajority-led Congress' designs for reconstruction, especially those sought by the Republican Party's "Radical Republican" faction.

The law required that the president and the secretary of war to issue orders only through the general of the army, a position held by Ulysses S. Grant at the time of the law's passage. The constitutionality of the Command of Army Act is questionable. The law also stipulated that any attempt by the president to remove the general of the army from the chain of command would require Senate approval. The law was of dubious constitutionality. Even at the time that the Army Appropriations Bill which contained the act was being considered by the United States Senate in late February 1867, several of the Senate's lawyers believed that the law infringed on the constitutional authority of the president as commander-in-chief of the United States armed forces. The language in the law had been created by Edwin Stanton, the secretary of war.

The law was passed as a measure of the Army Appropriations Bill for 1867–1868. The act was a rider to the appropriations bill. The Army Appropriations Bill containing the act was initially passed in the United States House of Representatives on February 20, 1867, in a 90–32 vote. In total, the House saw 83 Republicans, 6 Unionists, and 1 independent Republican vote for the bill, and 28 Democrats, 1 Republican, and 3 Unionists vote against it. On February 2, 1867, the House and Senate resolved differences between their versions of the bill in a conference committee. On the same day that the Army Appropriations Act containing the Command of Army Bill was agreed to by the conference committee, the United States Congress also passed into law, over the president's veto, the Tenure of Office Act, which prohibited the president from removing certain federal officials without the approval of the United States Senate. They also passed other consequential legislation into law over Johnson's veto that day, including the first of the Reconstruction Acts. It was expected that Johnson would veto the Army Appropriations Bill due to the Command of Army Act provision. Despite taking formal issue with this and another provision, arguing that the Command of Army Act was unconstitutional, Johnson signed the appropriations bill containing it on March 4, 1867.

Alleged violations of the Command of Army Act by President Johnson were cited in the articles of impeachment against Johnson that were adopted by the United States House of Representatives as part of the impeachment of Andrew Johnson in 1868. While the majority of the articles of impeachment dealt primarily with alleged violation of the Tenure of Office Act, the ninth article of impeachment accused Johnson of violating the Command of Army Act by pressuring General William H. Emory to ignore the act as unconstitutional, and instead of taking orders through General Grant to take orders directly from Johnson himself. The eleventh article reiterated this charge.
