= James Tracy Hale =

American politician (1810–1865)

James T. Hale
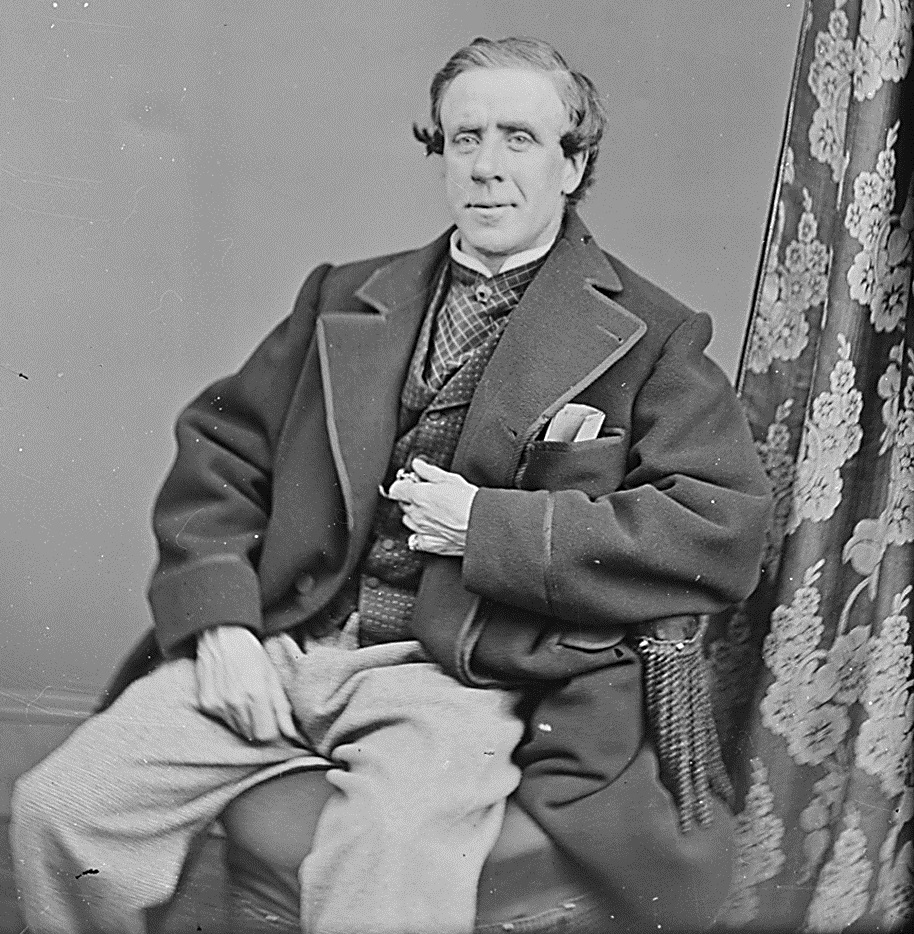

Member of the U.S. House of Representatives from Pennsylvania
- In office March 4, 1859 – March 3, 1865
- Preceded by: Allison White
- Succeeded by: Stephen Fowler Wilson
- Constituency: 15th district (1859–1863); 18th district (1863–1865)

Personal details
- Born: October 14, 1810 Towanda, Pennsylvania, U.S.
- Died: April 6, 1865 (aged 54) Bellefonte, Pennsylvania, U.S.
- Party: Republican

James Tracy Hale (October 14, 1810 – April 6, 1865) was a Republican member of the U.S. House of Representatives from Pennsylvania.

== Biography ==
James T. Hale was born October 14, 1810, in Towanda, Pennsylvania, the son of Reuben & Wealthy Ann (Tracy) Hale. He studied law partly with his brother-in-law, General William Patton (1799-1877), and partly with his uncle, Elias White Hale (1775-1832). He was admitted to the bar in 1832 in Lewistown, Pennsylvania, and where he practiced for several years. He married Jane Walker Huston (1815-1883), daughter of Justice Charles Huston of the Pennsylvania Supreme Court and Mary Winter. Afterward Mr. Hale and his bride moved to Bellefonte, Pennsylvania, where his father-in-law resided. After practicing there for a short time in 1851 he was appointed president judge of the twentieth judicial district and served in that office until 1858. Hale served as president of the Tyrone and Clearfield Railroad from 1856–1858.

In 1858 Hale was elected as a Republican to the Thirty-sixth and in 1860 elected to Thirty-seventh Congresses and in 1862 as an Independent Republican to the Thirty-eighth Congress. During his last term he served as chairman of the United States House Committee on Claims. He was conservative in his political views and urged Congress to pass compromise resolutions soon after the outbreak of the Civil War.

He was a Christian, and a member of the Episcopal Church.

Children of James T. Hale and Jane Walker Huston: Charles H. Hale (1837–1872), James Tracy Hale (1848–1877) & George N. Hale (1850–1885).

James T. Hale, Sr. died after a short bout of typhoid fever on April 6, 1865, in Bellefonte, Pennsylvania, and was there buried at Union Cemetery. He was the first cousin of Secretary of the Navy, Gideon Welles.

== Sources ==
- United States Congress. "James Tracy Hale (id: H000032)". Biographical Directory of the United States Congress.
- The Political Graveyard

U.S. House of Representatives
Preceded by Allison White	Member of the U.S. House of Representatives from Pennsylvania's 15th congressional district 1859–1863	Succeeded by Joseph Bailey
Preceded by Samuel S. Blair	Member of the U.S. House of Representatives from Pennsylvania's 18th congressional district 1863–1865	Succeeded by Stephen F. Wilson
