= John Rufus Edie =

American politician

John R. Edie

Member of the U.S. House of Representatives from Pennsylvania's 18th district
- In office March 4, 1855 – March 3, 1859
- Preceded by: John McCulloch
- Succeeded by: Samuel Steel Blair

Member of the Pennsylvania Senate
- In office 1845-1846

Personal details
- Born: January 14, 1814 Gettysburg, Pennsylvania, US
- Died: August 27, 1888 (aged 74) Somerset, Pennsylvania, US
- Resting place: Union Cemetery, Somerset
- Party: Whig Party; Republican

Military service
- Allegiance: United States
- Branch/service: United States Army
- Years of service: 1861–1871
- Rank: Lieutenant colonel Brevet Colonel
- Unit: 15th U.S. Infantry Regiment; 8th U.S. Infantry Regiment
- Commands: Regular Brigade, XIV Corps
- Battles/wars: American Civil War

John Rufus Edie (January 14, 1814 – August 27, 1888) was a Whig Party and Republican member of the U.S. House of Representatives from Pennsylvania and a United States Army officer in the American Civil War.

== Early life ==
John Rufus Edie was born in Gettysburg, Pennsylvania in 1814. He attended the public schools and then Emmitsburg College in Emmitsburg, Maryland. He served as principal of the Gettysburg schools for several years. Edie studied law, was admitted to the bar in 1840 and commenced practice in Somerset, Pennsylvania. His son, John R. Edie Junior, was an 1861 graduate of the United States Military Academy at West Point, New York.

== Political activities ==
Edie served as a member of the Pennsylvania State Senate in 1845 and 1846. He was appointed deputy attorney general in 1847 and served until 1850; afterwards serving as district attorney from 1850 to 1854.

He was elected as an Whig Party candidate to the Thirty-fourth Congress, and reelected as a Republican to the Thirty-fifth Congress. He was not a candidate for renomination in 1858.

== Civil War service ==
Edie was commissioned a major of the 15th Infantry Regiment on May 14, 1861; and commanded its field detachment that served in the western theater. He frequently served as commander of the Regular Brigade in the XIV Corps of the Army of the Cumberland. He was promoted to lieutenant colonel of the 8th Infantry Regiment in September 1864 and brevetted colonel the same month. He served until January 1871, when he was honorably discharged. Colonel Edie then resumed the practice of law in Somerset and died there in 1888, being interred in the local Union Cemetery.

== Sources ==
- United States Congress. "John Rufus Edie (id: E000049)". Biographical Directory of the United States Congress. Retrieved on 2008-02-14
- The Political Graveyard

U.S. House of Representatives
Preceded by John McCulloch	Member of the U.S. House of Representatives from Pennsylvania's 18th congressional district 1855–1859	Succeeded by Samuel Steel Blair
