= Judge Armstrong =

Judge Armstrong may refer to:

- David L. Armstrong (1941–2017), county court judge for Jefferson County, Kentucky
- George Thomas Armstrong (1881–1941), county court judge for the southern judicial district of Manitoba
- James Armstrong (Pennsylvania politician) (1748–1828), associate judge of the Cumberland County, Pennsylvania, Court
- James Dillon Armstrong (1821–1893), judge of the 4th and 12th West Virginia Judicial Circuits
- James R. Armstrong (1876–1956), judge of the Oklahoma Court of Criminal Appeals
- Joan Bernard Armstrong (1941–2018), judge of the Louisiana Fourth Circuit Courts of Appeal
- Robert P. Armstrong (born 1938), judge of the Court of Appeal for Ontario
- Saundra Brown Armstrong (born 1947), judge of the United States District Court for the Northern District of California

== See also ==
- Justice Armstrong (disambiguation)
