= Samuel Steel Blair =

American politician

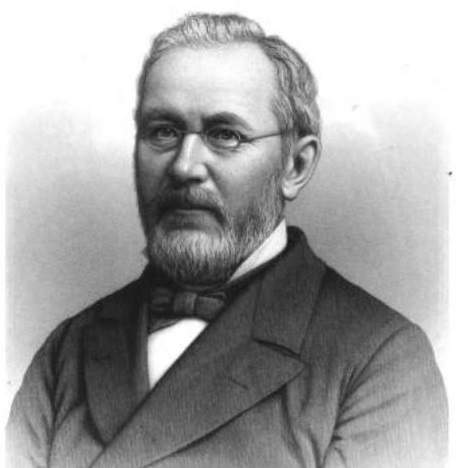

Member of the U.S. House of Representatives from Pennsylvania's 18th district
- In office March 4, 1859 – March 3, 1863
- Preceded by: John R. Edie
- Succeeded by: James T. Hale

Personal details
- Born: December 5, 1821 Indiana, Pennsylvania, U.S.
- Died: December 8, 1890 (aged 69)
- Party: Republican

Samuel Steel Blair (December 5, 1821 – December 8, 1890) was a Republican United States Representative from Pennsylvania.

During the American Civil War, he called for increasingly harsh treatment against the southern states which had seceded from the Union, saying: "This rebellion cannot be put down by soft words and lenient measures."

== Formative years ==
Born in Indiana, Pennsylvania on December 5, 1821, Blair was a product of his community's public schools. He then attended and, in 1838, graduated from Jefferson College, in Canonsburg, Pennsylvania.

After completing further studies in law, and securing admission to the bar in 1845, he began practicing law in Hollidaysburg, Pennsylvania in 1846.

From 1849 until 1864, he practiced law in Hollidaysburg in partnership with John Dean, who later became a Pennsylvania Supreme Court justice.

== Political career ==
A member of the Republican Party in the United States, Blair was chosen to be a delegate to the 1856 Republican National Convention, and was elected to the U.S. House of Representatives in 1858 and 1860. During the Thirty-seventh Congress, Blair was named chairman of the United States House Committee on Private Lands. After unsuccessfully running for reelection in 1862, he resumed the practice of law.

As the American Civil War wore on, Blair urged his colleagues in the federal government to eschew "soft words and lenient measures," and pressed them to adopt a harsher stance against the southern states that were deemed to be "in rebellion." In a lengthy speech before the U.S. House of Representatives on May 22, 1862, Blair said:

"Mr. Speaker, we are divided in opinion about many things connected with the war, there is one purpose, however, in which a majority of this House would seem to be nearly united, and that is that the Government of the United States shall not be curtailed in its extent of territorial jurisdiction by the surrender of one foot of its soil to the southern confederacy. The people will not tolerate a conventional separation of any portion of this Union from the rest. If this is not a part of our fixed policy, if we are not in solid earnest to this extent, not an hour should be lost before sending an ambassador to Richmond to close the war. There was a time when it did appear as if—while the people were to be amused by movements leading to no decisive results—a subtile policy would, after long delay terminate hostilities by the jugglery of a compromise. The gloomy apprehensions of such a disaster were fast seizing upon the public mind; but the recent successes of our arms, on many fields of heroic valor have lifted the burden from the heart of the nation, and set it once more on its way of promise and of hope. The rebellion is to be subdued by the Army, not by concessions to treason; by the earnestness of war, not by the chicane of diplomacy.

... It is impossible for us to be at peace with a power which takes slavery, the stone which our fathers rejected, and defiantly makes it the head of its corner.

The object of this war upon our part is to restore the authority of the Government wherever it has been displaced, to enable the people ultimately to return to State governments in the Union, and to the full enjoyments of all their rightful possessions; except in so far as they may be deprived of them by the shock of war in the effort to subdue the rebellion and prevent its recurrence.

It is vain and foolish to expect or desire the original status of things as it was before the disturbances. We cannot expect the dead to rise from their bloody graves, nor homes once happy to spring up out of their ashes. For the losses of trade, of property of every kind taken, injured, or destroyed, there will be no recompense but in the lessons of wisdom they will teach; and when we see slavery gorged with the blood of the slain, and rioting in the havoc of war ... if the angels shall keep their vigils around about it, so that nothing in all the conflict shall do it harm, then must we, indeed, believe that it is a divine and sacred thing."

Blair went on in this speech to declare, "Slavery is the great primary cause" of the war, adding:

"It prompted the war, sustains and supports it, and it is waged for the openly avowed purpose of its perpetuation. No amount of sophistry can gainsay the truth of this proposition.... The monster is too gross, bald, and palpable to be concealed by all the disguises which ingenuity can weave. History will so write it down as plain truth.... I believe that unless we have the courage and the resolution to meet this enemy of our peace upon the square, and destroy it where it attempts to destroy us, another generation will not pass away till a new rebellion must be quelled, another debt of greater magnitude be added to the present, and the nation must again offer for sacrifice fresh hecatombs of her noble youth. We do not owe these troubles to any essential difference of sectional interests or of the character of the people. With all our diversity of soils, climates, and productions, we are truly homogeneous. The evils in which I am convinced are to be found the germs of the rebellion, would be just as manifest in Pennsylvania or Massachusetts, if slavery were there, as in Virginia or South Carolina.... The power given by law in any country, in any State, by which one man is permitted to own another as property is a tremendous one, and far transcending all other rights of property, it will always be, while human nature remains as it is, a stronger lever of social and political influence than all other interests....

It will be the pivot point of success for either party when it becomes wise enough to adopt the Madisonian idea of converting chattels into men....

There are those who look upon ... emancipation as evidence of our national decline and the decay of our constitutional liberty; but to me, Mr. Speaker, it is the surest evidence of our perpetuity as a nation."

Blair then went on to urge his colleagues to treat the seceded southern states as "a foreign Government of a thousand years' existence" that was at war with the United States, and pressed Congress to adopt "measures to pursue and destroy the enemy" and "destroy the southern confederacy." During the next major portion of his address, he then presented a lengthy discourse regarding the need for large-scale emancipation of the men, women and children who were still enslaved in the south, based on "the analogous belligerent right of confiscation of enemy's property," and advocated for passage of a new confiscation bill that would facilitate this emancipation before closing his oration with the following words:

"This rebellion cannot be put down with soft words and lenient measures. We extended the olive branch full too long, until our flag was disgraced and war commenced by the mad conspirators. We must, by all the means at our command, strike down the power of rebels to assail us, and then the work is done. They can build less iron-clad gunboats, now that we have Norfolk. They can cast less columbiads, build less steam-rams, and obtain less sugar to sweeten the bitter cup of treason, now that we have New Orleans; and when we have Richmond and Corinth, the back-bone of the rebellion will be broken.

The path of duty never shone so bright for a people as it does for us to-day. As we advance it grows brighter. The President's message recommending emancipation was the rending of the vail. The gift of freedom to a few poor, but oh! how grateful, recipients, has returned to bless the hearts of millions who bestowed it. A deed more rich in virtue, more fruitful in the approving of conscience, more blessed with the smiles of Almighty God, stands not on the records of this nation. The whole ample domain of the Territories will soon be declared free, and that for which we have labored for many years is about to be accomplished. I do not know how much may be affected by legislation to redeem a race from bondage whose enslavement is the crime for which we suffer. The providences of God are brought about through courses that are not always plain to mortal eye, and yet to them there is no "variableness of shadow of turning," and our path to-day lies by their side. Events are marching on. Happy is that people who blind not their eyes to the "cloud by day and the pillar of fire by night."

In 1874, Blair attempted to regain higher office, but was once again unsuccessful.

== Death and interment ==
Blair died in Hollidaysburg and was interred in that community's Presbyterian Cemetery.

U.S. House of Representatives
Preceded by John R. Edie	Member of the U.S. House of Representatives from Pennsylvania's 18th congressional district 1859–1863	Succeeded by James T. Hale
