= John Dean (Pennsylvania judge) =

American judge

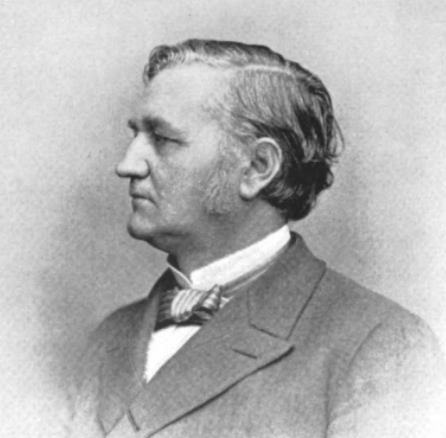
- Justice John Dean, c. 1892
- Born: February 15, 1835; Williamsburg, Pennsylvania
- Died: May 29, 1905; Hollidaysburg, Pennsylvania
- Occupation(s): American judge (member of the Pennsylvania Supreme Court, 1892-1905)
- Spouse(s): Anna Rebecca (Caldwell) Dean (1825-1874) and Margaret (Bell) Dean (1848-1934)
- Parent(s): Matthew Dean and Anna (Patterson) Dean

John Dean (February 15, 1835 — May 29, 1905) was a district attorney in Hollidaysburg, Pennsylvania who became a Pennsylvania Supreme Court justice.

== Formative years ==
Born in Williamsburg, Pennsylvania, on February 15, 1835, John Dean was a son of Matthew Dean, a tanner and farmer, and Anna (Patterson) Dean. One of eight sons in the Dean family, John Dean was also a brother to three sisters.

Educated in the common schools of Williamsburg, John Dean received further training at the Williamsburg Academy and at Washington College, where he studied for a year before leaving to become a teacher in the local school at Williamsburg.

While still a teacher, Dean also began to study law with James M. Bell and D. H. Hoffius in Hollidaysburg, Pennsylvania.

=== Marriages and children ===
Reportedly more than six feet tall, Dean married his first wife Rebecca Caldwell (1825–1874) in 1857. A daughter of Judge David Caldwell and Sarah (Martin) Caldwell, Rebecca (Caldwell) Dean widowed her husband on July 23, 1874, when she died in Hollidaysburg at the age of 48. Following funeral services, she was buried at that community's Presbyterian Cemetery.

Dean then remarried in November 1876, taking Margaret Bell (1848–1934) as his bride. Their children were: Elisa (Dean) Findley (1878–1960), Anna (Dean) Baldrige (1880–1975), Claribel Dean (1882–1955), and Margaret Dean (1885–1971).

== Legal, political and judicial career ==
Admitted to the bar on March 21, 1855, Dean became a working lawyer shortly thereafter. From 1849 until 1864, he practiced law in Hollidaysburg in partnership with Samuel Steel Blair, who later became a member of the U.S. House of Representatives. In May 1857, Dean was elected to a three-year term as superintendent of his county's public schools; however, he resigned after a year in order to return to his private law practice.

A member of the Republican Party, Dean was appointed as district attorney for Blair County in 1867 to fill a vacancy created by the resignation of John H. Keatley, and was then elected to that same office in 1868, serving for three years in that capacity.

In 1871, Dean was elected president judge of the Twenty-fourth Judicial District, and subsequently reelected to that post in 1881 and 1891. In 1892, while serving his last term in that office, he was elected to the Pennsylvania Supreme Court.

== Death and interment ==
Dean died in Hollidaysburg on May 29, 1905, while still a sitting justice on the Pennsylvania Supreme Court. Following funeral services, he was buried at the Hollidaysburg Presbyterian Cemetery.
