= John McCulloch (American politician) =

American politician (1806–1879)

- Born: November 15, 1806; McCullochs Mills, Pennsylvania, U.S.
- Died: May 15, 1879 (aged 72); Huntingdon, Pennsylvania, U.S.
- Resting place: Riverside Cemetery
- Education: Jefferson College; University of Pennsylvania
- Occupation: congressman

John McCulloch (November 15, 1806 – May 15, 1879) was a Whig member of the U.S. House of Representatives from Pennsylvania.

John McCulloch was born in McCullochs Mills, Pennsylvania. He attended the common schools and graduated from Jefferson College in Canonsburg, Pennsylvania, in 1825. He studied medicine and graduated from the medical department of the University of Pennsylvania in 1829. He commenced practice in Green Tree, Pennsylvania. He moved to Petersburg, Pennsylvania, in 1830, where he practiced medicine until 1852.

McCulloch was elected as a Whig to the Thirty-third Congress. He was not a candidate for renomination in 1854. He resumed practicing medicine in Huntingdon, Pennsylvania. He became affiliated with the Republican Party upon its formation in 1856. He was a member of the State constitutional convention in 1874. He died in Huntingdon in 1879 and was interred in Riverside Cemetery.

== Sources ==
- United States Congress. "John McCulloch (id: M000390)". Biographical Directory of the United States Congress.
- The Political Graveyard

U.S. House of Representatives
Preceded by John L. Dawson	Member of the U.S. House of Representatives from Pennsylvania's 18th congressional district 1853–1855	Succeeded by John R. Edie
