= Glades, Pennsylvania =

Unincorporated community in Pennsylvania, US

Coordinates: 40°00′36″N 76°40′49″W

Glades is an unincorporated community in York County, Pennsylvania, United States.
