= Stephen F. Wilson =

American politician

Stephen Fowler Wilson
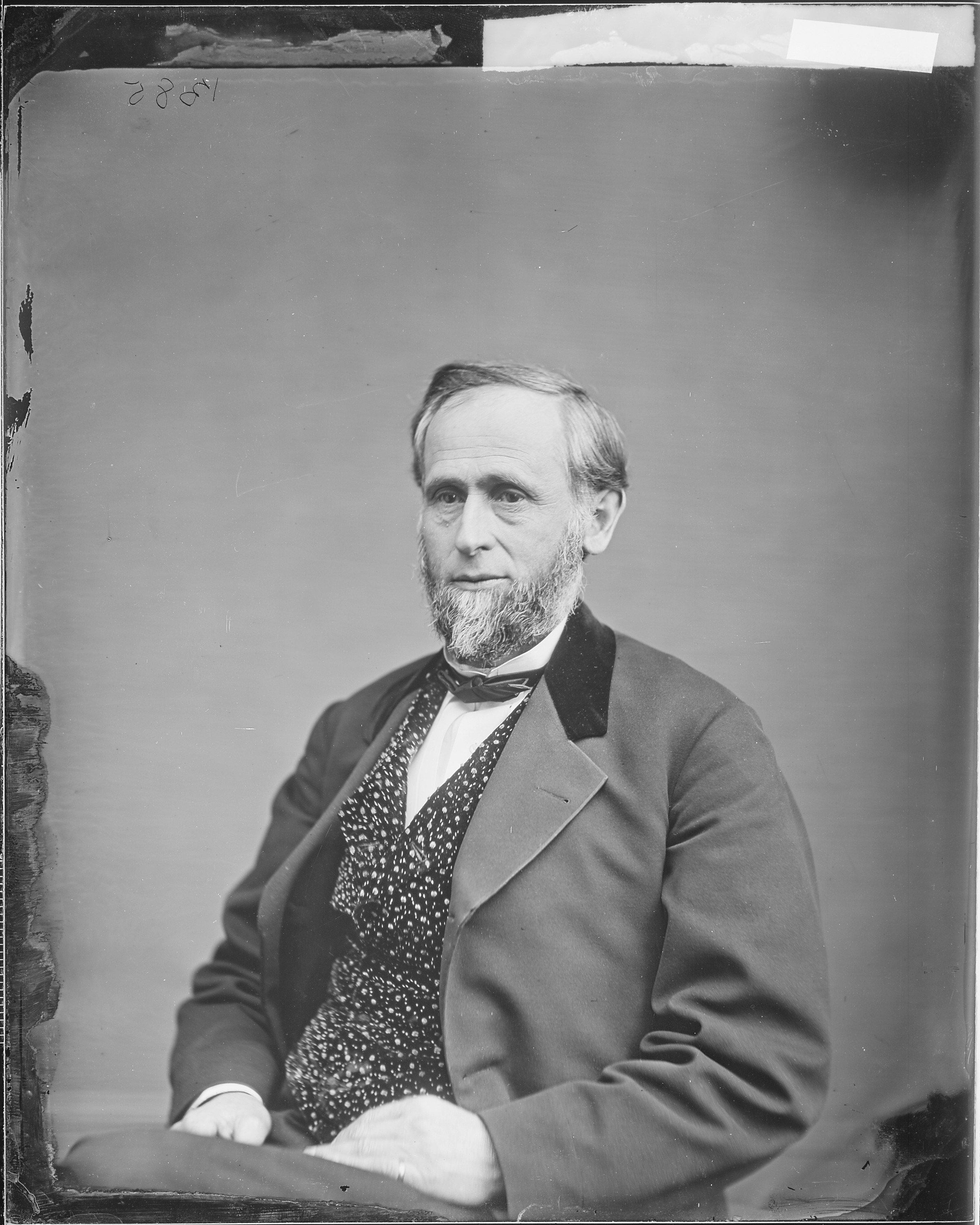

Member of the U.S. House of Representatives from Pennsylvania's 18th district
- In office March 4, 1865 – March 3, 1869
- Preceded by: James T. Hale
- Succeeded by: William Hepburn Armstrong

Member of the Pennsylvania Senate from the 1st district
- In office 1863–1865
- Preceded by: Jacob Elwood Ridgway
- Succeeded by: William McCandless

Personal details
- Born: September 4, 1821 Columbia Township, Pennsylvania, U.S.
- Died: March 30, 1897 (aged 75) Wellsboro, Pennsylvania, U.S.
- Party: Republican

Stephen Fowler Wilson (September 4, 1821 – March 30, 1897) was an American lawyer, politician and judge from Pennsylvania who served as a Republican member of the U.S. House of Representatives for Pennsylvania's 18th congressional district from 1865 to 1869. He also served as a member of the Pennsylvania State Senate for the 1st district from 1863 to 1865.

== Early life and education ==
Wilson was born in Columbia Township, Pennsylvania the youngest of seven children born to George and Jane Wilson. He studied law under the Honorable James Lowrey and in 1845 was admitted to the Tioga County bar. He practiced law for almost 25 years. He was originally a Democrat but switched to a Republican when that party was founded. He held several local offices.

== Career ==
He was a member of the Pennsylvania State Senate for the 1st district from 1863 to 1865 and served in one session after he had been elected a Representative to Congress. He was a delegate to the 1864 Republican National Convention.

Wilson was elected as a Republican to the Thirty-ninth and Fortieth Congresses. He was appointed additional judge of the fourth judicial district of Pennsylvania in 1871 to fill a vacancy. He was elected additional judge and served ten years. He was appointed associate justice of the supreme court of the New Mexico Territorial Supreme Court by President Chester A. Arthur on October 16, 1884. He was president judge of the fourth judicial district of Pennsylvania from 1887 to 1889. He resumed the practice of law in Wellsboro, Pennsylvania, where he died in 1897.

== Sources ==
- United States Congress. "Stephen F. Wilson (id: W000613)". Biographical Directory of the United States Congress.
- The Political Graveyard

Pennsylvania State Senate
Preceded by Jacob Elwood Ridgway	Member of the Pennsylvania Senate, 1st district 1863-1865	Succeeded by William McCandless
U.S. House of Representatives
Preceded by James T. Hale	Member of the U.S. House of Representatives from Pennsylvania's 18th congressional district 1865–1869	Succeeded by William H. Armstrong
