= James Armstrong (Pennsylvania judge) =

American judge (1794–1867)

Justice of the Supreme Court of Pennsylvania
- In office April 6, 1857 – December 1, 1857
- Preceded by: Jeremiah S. Black
- Succeeded by: William Strong

Personal details
- Born: February 15, 1794 Berks County, Pennsylvania
- Died: August 13, 1867 (aged 73) Williamsport, Pennsylvania
- Spouse: Sarah Hepburn
- Children: 3, including William

James Armstrong (February 15, 1794 – August 13, 1867) was a justice of the Supreme Court of Pennsylvania from April 6, 1857 to December 1, 1857.

== Career ==
Born in Berks County, Pennsylvania, Armstrong moved to Milton, Pennsylvania, as a child, and then to Williamsport, Pennsylvania, where he studied law and was admitted to the bar. Armstrong "served a brief period on the Supreme Bench in 1857", having been "appointed on the 6th of April of that year to fill the vacancy occasioned by the resignation of Jeremiah S. Black". At the time of his appointment, Armstrong "was the leader of the Lycoming county bar". He served on the state supreme court until December 1, 1857.

== Personal life and death ==
Armstrong married Sarah Hepburn, daughter of James and Mary Hopewell Hepburn, of Northumberland, Pennsylvania. From this union three children were born, William Hepburn Armstrong, who later served in the United States House of Representatives, Mary Hopewell and Sarah Emily Perry.

Armstrong died in Williamsport, Lycoming County, Pennsylvania, at the age of 73.

Political offices
Preceded by Jeremiah S. Black	Justice of the Supreme Court of Pennsylvania; 1857–1857	Succeeded by William Strong
