= First impeachment inquiry into Andrew Johnson =

First impeachment inquiry against Andrew Johnson
- Accused: Andrew Johnson, 17th President of the United States
- Committee: Judiciary
- Committee chair: James F. Wilson
- Date: January 7 – November 25, 1867 (10 months, 2 weeks and 5 days)
- Outcome: Impeachment inquiry completed; Judiciary Committee recommended impeachment; recommendation rejected by full House vote
- Charges: High crimes and misdemeanors

Congressional votes

House vote authorizing the inquiry
- Votes in favor: 108
- Votes against: 39
- Result: Approved

First vote by the House Judiciary Committee an impeachment resolution
- Votes in favor: 4
- Votes against: 5
- Result: Rejected

Final vote by the House Judiciary Committee on the impeachment resolution
- Votes in favor: 5
- Votes against: 4
- Result: Approved

Subsequent House vote on the impeachment resolution
- Votes in favor: 57
- Votes against: 108
- Result: Rejected

The first impeachment inquiry into Andrew Johnson was launched by a vote of the United States House of Representatives on January 7, 1867, to investigate the potential impeachment of the President of the United States, Andrew Johnson. It was run by the House Committee on the Judiciary.

The vote authorizing the inquiry was viewed as giving Republicans an opportunity to register their disdain for Johnson without formally impeaching him. Most congressmen had expected that the sentiments in House Committee on the Judiciary would side against impeachment. However, surprising many, the committee voted 5–4 on November 25, 1867, to recommend impeachment (after having held a preliminary vote against it months prior). Despite this recommendation, the House voted 57–108 on December 7, 1867, against impeaching Johnson, with more Republicans voting against impeachment than for it.

This impeachment inquiry preceded the second impeachment inquiry into Andrew Johnson (launched in January 1868), which played a role in the lead-up to Johnson's impeachment on February 24, 1868.

== Background ==
Some Radical Republicans had entertained the thought of impeaching President Andrew Johnson since as early as 1866. However, the Republican Party was divided on the prospect of impeachment, with moderates in the party, who held a plurality, widely opposing it at this point. The radicals were more in favor of impeachment, as their plans for strong reform in reconstruction were greatly imperiled by Johnson. Among of the first Radical Republicans to explore impeachment was House Territories Committee chairman James Mitchell Ashley. Ashley was convinced of a baseless conspiracy theory that faulted Johnson for involvement in conspiring in the assassination of Lincoln. Thus, Ashley had strong personal motivation for wanting to remove Johnson from office. Ashley quietly began researching impeachment. Federal impeachment was rare in the United States.

Several attempts were made by Radical Republicans to initiate impeachment, but these were successfully rebuffed by moderate Republicans in party leadership. After the December 1866 meeting of the House Republican caucus, in an effort to block any further efforts to impeach Johnson, the moderate Republicans leading the party's caucus passed a rule for the Republican caucus which required that both a majority of House Republicans and a majority of members on the House Committee on the Judiciary would be required to approve any measure regarding impeachment in party caucus prior to it being considered in the House. Radical Republicans continued to seek Johnson's impeachment. They disobeyed the rule put in place for the Republican caucus. Radicals proposed a number of impeachment resolutions, which the moderate Republicans often stifled by referring to committees.

By the start of the year 1867, on a daily basis, Congress was receiving petitions demanding the removal of Johnson. These petitions came primarily from the Midwestern states. The petitions were the result of an organized campaign to demand Johnson's removal. The number of signatures on these petitions varied, as some had as few as three signatures, while other petitions had as many as three hundred signatures.

By the December 1866 start of the lame-duck third session of the 39th Congress, a number of Radical Republicans were demanding the creation of a select committee to investigate the prospect of impeaching Johnson, but this still faced resistance within the Republican Party caucus. On December 17, 1866, James Mitchell Ashley attempted to open a house impeachment inquiry, but his motion to suspend the rules to consider his resolution saw a vote of 88–49, which was short of the needed two-thirds majority to suspend the rules. Nevertheless, Ashley agreed with Thaddeus Stevens to again bring an impeachment resolution before the full House.

== House passage of the resolution authorizing the inquiry ==
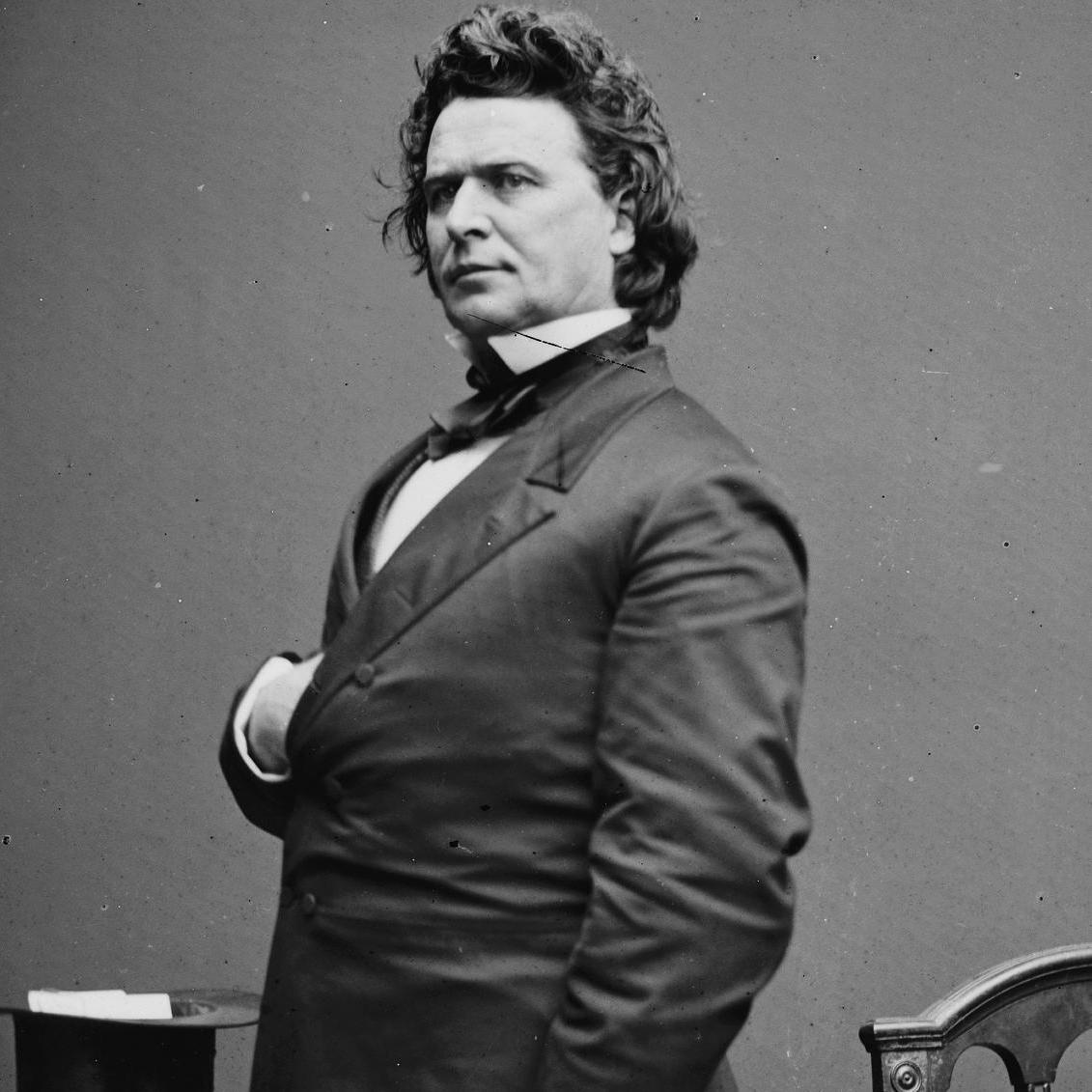
The resolution authorizing the impeachment inquiry was authored by James Mitchell Ashley

On January 7, 1867, Benjamin F. Loan, John R. Kelso, and James Mitchell Ashley each introduced three separate impeachment resolutions against Johnson. The House refused to hold debate or vote on either Loan or Kelso's resolutions. However, they did allow a vote on Ashley's impeachment-related resolution. Unlike the other two impeachment bills introduced that day (which would have outright impeached Johnson), Ashley's bill offered a specific outline of how an impeachment process would proceed, and it did not start with an immediate impeachment. Rather than going to a direct vote on impeaching the president, his resolution would instruct the Judiciary Committee to "inquire into the official conduct of Andrew Johnson", investigating what it called Johnson's "corruptly used" powers and "usurpation of power", including Johnson's political appointments, use of his pardon powers (alluding to his pardons for ex-Confederates), vetoes of legislation, selling of confiscated property, and alleged interference with elections. While it gave the general charge of "high crimes and misdemeanors" and named numerous instances of alleged corruption, Ashley's resolution did not specify what the high crimes and misdemeanors Johnson had committed were. The grievances listed in the resolution amounted largely to political grievances which Ashley had against Johnson.

The resolution read,

I do impeach Andrew Johnson, Vice President and acting President of the United States, of high crimes and misdemeanors:
I charge him with a usurpation of power and violation of law:
In that he has corruptly used the appointing power;
In that he has corruptly used the pardoning power;
In that he has corruptly used the veto power;
In that he has corruptly disposed of public property of the United States;
In that he has corruptly interfered in elections, and committed acts which, in contemplation of the Constitution, are high crimes and misdemeanors:
Therefore,
Be it resolved, That the Committee on the Judiciary be, and they are hereby, authorized to inquire into the official conduct of Andrew Johnson, Vice President of the United States, discharging the powers and duties of the office of President of the United States, and to report to this House, whether, in their opinion, the said Andrew Johnson, while in said office, has been guilty of acts which are designed or calculated to overthrow, subvert, or corrupt the Government of the United States, or any department or office thereof; and whether the said Andrew Johnson has been guilty of any act, or has conspired with others to do acts, which, in contemplation of the Constitution, are high crimes and misdemeanors, requiring the interposition of the constitutional power of this House; and that said committee have power to send for persons and papers, and to administer the customary oath to witnesses.

The resolution passed in the House 108–39. It was seen as offering Republicans a chance to register their displeasure with Johnson, without actually formally impeaching him. Many Republicans believed that, in the Judiciary Committee, any impeachment resolution would die a quiet death. Of the 108 members of the House that are recording as having voted in favor of the resolution, 1 was a Democrat, 99 were Republicans, and 7 were Unconditional Unionists, 1 was an independent Republican. Of the 6 to vote against it, 25 were Democrats, 6 were Republicans, 3 were Unconditional Unionists, and 5 were Unionists. 44 members of congress were absent (14 Democrats, 28 Republicans, 2 and Unconditional Unionists). Additionally, Speaker Schuyler Colfax (a Republican) did not vote, as House rules do not require the speaker to vote during ordinary legislative proceedings, unless their vote would be decisive or if the vote is being cast by ballot.

The official record shows Democrat John Winthrop Chanler as voting in favor of the resolution (thus, this article lists him as having voted so). However, the New-York Tribune, following the vote, strongly suspected that this was a clerical error.

Vote on the impeachment inquiry resolution
January 7, 1867	Party					Total votes
January 7, 1867	Democratic	Republican	Unconditional Union	Unionists	Independent Republican	Total votes
Yea	1	99	7	0	1	108
Nay	25	6	3	5	0	39

Comparative bar chart
Vote	Vote total
"Yea" votes	108
"Nay" votes	39
Absent/not voting	45

Full list of votes
District	Member	Party	Vote
Massachusetts 6	John B. Alley	Republican	Yea
Iowa 3	William B. Allison	Republican	Yea
Massachusetts 2	Oakes Ames	Republican	Yea
Pennsylvania 8	Sydenham Elnathan Ancona	Democrat	Nay
Missouri 9	George Washington Anderson	Republican	Absent
Tennessee 6	Samuel Mayes Arnell	Unconditional Union	Yea
Nevada at-large	Delos R. Ashley	Republican	Yea
Ohio 10	James Mitchell Ashley	Republican	Yea
Illinois 12	Jehu Baker	Republican	Yea
Massachusetts 8	John Denison Baldwin	Republican	Yea
Massachusetts 5	Nathaniel P. Banks	Republican	Yea
Pennsylvania 17	Abraham Andrews Barker	Republican	Yea
Vermont 3	Portus Baxter	Republican	Yea
Michigan 1	Fernando C. Beaman	Republican	Yea
Missouri 8	John F. Benjamin	Republican	Yea
New York 2	Teunis G. Bergen	Democrat	Nay
California 3	John Bidwell	Republican	Yea
Ohio 16	John Bingham	Republican	Yea
Maine 3	James G. Blaine	Republican	Yea
Missouri 2	Henry Taylor Blow	Republican	Absent
Massachusetts 7	George S. Boutwell	Republican	Yea
Pennsylvania 6	Benjamin Markley Boyer	Democrat	Absent
Connecticut 3	Augustus Brandegee	Republican	Yea
Illinois 7	Henry P. H. Bromwell	Republican	Yea
Pennsylvania 7	John Martin Broomall	Republican	Yea
Ohio 9	Ralph Pomeroy Buckland	Republican	Yea
Ohio 11	Hezekiah S. Bundy	Republican	Yea
Tennessee 5	William B. Campbell	Unionist	Nay
New York 7	John Winthrop Chanler	Democrat	Yea
Ohio 6	Reader W. Clarke	Republican	Yea
Kansas at-large	Sidney Clarke	Republican	Yea
Wisconsin 3	Amasa Cobb	Republican	Yea
New York 21	Roscoe Conkling	Republican	Absent
Indiana 9	Schuyler Colfax	Republican	Did not vote (speaker)^{α}
Illinois 6	Burton C. Cook	Republican	Yea
Tennessee 4	Edmund Cooper	Unionist	Nay
Illinois 8	Shelby Moore Cullom	Republican	Yea
Pennsylvania 20	Charles Vernon Culver	Republican	Yea
New York 9	William Augustus Darling	Republican	Yea
New York 23	Thomas Treadwell Davis	Republican	Nay
Massachusetts 10	Henry Dawes	Republican	Absent
Pennsylvania 21	John Littleton Dawson	Democrat	Nay
Indiana 10	Joseph H. Defrees	Republican	Yea
Ohio 13	Columbus Delano	Republican	Yea
Connecticut 1	Henry Deming	Republican	Yea
Pennsylvania 12	Charles Denison	Democrat	Absent
Rhode Island 2	Nathan F. Dixon II	Republican	Yea
New York 8	William E. Dodge	Republican	Nay
Minnesota 2	Ignatius L. Donnelly	Republican	Yea
Michigan 6	John F. Driggs	Republican	Yea
Indiana 6	John F. Driggs	Republican	Absent
Ohio 17	Ephraim R. Eckley	Republican	Yea
Ohio 1	Benjamin Eggleston	Republican	Absent
Wisconsin 4	Charles A. Eldredge	Democrat	Nay
Massachusetts 1	Thomas D. Eliot	Republican	Absent
Illinois 2	John F. Farnsworth	Republican	Yea
Indiana 4	John Hanson Farquhar	Republican	Yea
Michigan 4	Thomas W. Ferry	Republican	Yea
Ohio 12	William E. Finck	Democrat	Nay
Ohio 19	James A. Garfield	Republican	Yea
Pennsylvania 15	Adam John Glossbrenner	Democrat	Nay
New York 14	Charles Goodyear	Democrat	Absent
Iowa 4	Josiah Bushnell Grinnell	Republican	Yea
New York 15	John Augustus Griswold	Republican	Absent
New York 16	Robert S. Hale	Republican	Absent
Kentucky 4	Aaron Harding	Democrat	Nay
Illinois 4	Abner C. Harding	Republican	Yea
Maryland 5	Benjamin Gwinn Harris	Democrat	Absent
New York 28	Roswell Hart	Republican	Yea
Tennessee 7	Isaac Roberts Hawkins	Unionist	Nay
Ohio 2	Rutherford B. Hayes	Republican	Yea
Oregon at-large	James Henry Dickey Henderson	Republican	Yea
California 2	William Higby	Republican	Yea
Indiana 3	Ralph Hill	Republican	Yea
Kentucky 3	Elijah Hise	Democrat	Nay
Missouri 1	John Hogan	Democrat	Nay
New York 22	Sidney Holmes	Republican	Yea
Massachusetts 4	Samuel Hooper	Republican	Yea
New York 26	Giles Hotchkiss	Republican	Absent
Iowa 6	Asahel W. Hubbard	Republican	Absent
West Virginia 1	Chester D. Hubbard	Unconditional Union	Yea
New York 19	Demas Hubbard Jr.	Republican	Absent
Connecticut 4	John Henry Hubbard	Republican	Yea
New York 13	Edwin N. Hubbell	Democrat	Absent
Ohio 8	James Randolph Hubbell	Republican	Nay
New York 17	Calvin T. Hulburd	Republican	Absent
New York 30	James M. Humphrey	Democrat	Nay
New York 3	John W. Hunter	Democrat	Nay
Illinois 5	Ebon C. Ingersoll	Republican	Yea
Rhode Island 1	Thomas Jenckes	Republican	Yea
Pennsylvania 11	Philip Johnson	Democrat	Absent
New York 4	Morgan Jones	Democrat	Absent
Indiana 5	George Washington Julian	Republican	Yea
Iowa 5	John A. Kasson	Republican	Yea
Pennsylvania 4	William D. Kelley	Republican	Yea
Missouri 4	John R. Kelso	Independent Republican	Yea
Indiana 2	Michael C. Kerr	Democrat	Nay
New York 12	John H. Ketcham	Republican	Yea
Pennsylvania 16	William Koontz	Republican	Absent
Illinois 13	Andrew J. Kuykendall	Republican	Yea
New York 20	Addison H. Laflin	Republican	Absent
West Virginia 2	George R. Latham	Unconditional Union	Nay
Pennsylvania 24	George Van Eman Lawrence	Republican	Yea
Ohio 4	William Lawrence	Republican	Yea
Ohio 5	Francis Celeste Le Blond	Democrat	Absent
Tennessee 8	John W. Leftwich	Unionist	Nay
Missouri 7	Benjamin F. Loan	Republican	Yea
Michigan 3	John W. Longyear	Republican	Yea
Maine 1	John Lynch	Republican	Yea
Illinois 11	Samuel S. Marshall	Democrat	Absent
New Hampshire 1	Gilman Marston	Republican	Yea
New York 18	James M. Marvin	Republican	Yea
Tennessee 2	Horace Maynard	Unconditional Union	Yea
Missouri 5	Joseph W. McClurg	Republican	Yea
Maryland 1	Hiram McCullough	Democrat	Nay
Wisconsin 6	Walter D. McIndoe	Republican	Absent
Kentucky 9	Samuel McKee	Unconditional Union	Yea
California 1	Donald C. McRuer	Republican	Yea
Pennsylvania 13	Ulysses Mercur	Republican	Yea
Pennsylvania 14	George Funston Miller	Republican	Yea
Pennsylvania 22	James K. Moorhead	Republican	Yea
Vermont 2	Justin Smith Morrill	Republican	Yea
New York 25	Daniel Morris	Republican	Absent
Illinois at-large	Samuel Wheeler Moulton	Republican	Yea
Pennsylvania 3	Leonard Myers	Republican	Yea
New Jersey 2	William A. Newell	Republican	Absent
Indiana 1	William E. Niblack	Democrat	Nay
Delaware at-large	John A. Nicholson	Democrat	Nay
Missouri 3	Thomas E. Noell	Republican	Nay
Pennsylvania 2	Charles O'Neill	Republican	Yea
Indiana 8	Godlove Stein Orth	Republican	Yea
Wisconsin 1	Halbert E. Paine	Republican	Yea
New Hampshire 3	James W. Patterson	Republican	Yea
Maine 2	Sidney Perham	Republican	Yea
Maryland 3	Charles E. Phelps	Unconditional Union	Nay
Maine 5	Frederick Augustus Pike	Republican	Yea
Ohio 15	Tobias A. Plants	Republican	Absent
New York 24	Theodore M. Pomeroy	Republican	Absent
Iowa 2	Hiram Price	Republican	Yea
New York 10	William Radford	Democrat	Absent
Pennsylvania 1	Samuel J. Randall	Democrat	Nay
Kentucky 8	William H. Randall	Unconditional Union	Yea
New York 6	Henry Jarvis Raymond	Republican	Nay
Massachusetts 3	Alexander H. Rice	Republican	Yea
Maine 4	John H. Rice	Republican	Yea
Kentucky 2	Burwell Ritter	Democrat	Nay
New Jersey 4	Andrew J. Rogers	Democrat	Absent
New Hampshire 2	Edward H. Rollins	Republican	Absent
Illinois 9	Lewis Winans Ross	Democrat	Nay
Kentucky 5	Lovell Rousseau	Unconditional Union	Yea
Wisconsin 5	Philetus Sawyer	Republican	Yea
Ohio 3	Robert C. Schenck	Republican	Yea
Pennsylvania 19	Glenni William Scofield	Republican	Yea
Kentucky 7	George S. Shanklin	Democrat	Nay
Ohio 7	Samuel Shellabarger	Republican	Absent
New Jersey 3	Charles Sitgreaves	Democrat	Absent
Wisconsin 2	Ithamar Sloan	Republican	Absent
Ohio 18	Rufus P. Spalding	Republican	Nay
New Jersey 1	John F. Starr	Republican	Yea
Pennsylvania 9	Thaddeus Stevens	Republican	Yea
Indiana 11	Thomas N. Stilwell	Republican	Absent
Tennessee 3	William Brickly Stokes	Unconditional Union	Yea
Pennsylvania 10	Myer Strouse	Democrat	Nay
New York 1	Stephen Taber	Democrat	Nay
Tennessee 1	Nathaniel Green Taylor	Unionist	Nay
New York 5	Nelson Taylor	Democrat	Nay
Pennsylvania 4	Martin Russell Thayer	Republican	Yea
Maryland 4	Francis Thomas	Unconditional Union	Yea
Maryland 2	John Lewis Thomas Jr.	Unconditional Union	Yea
Illinois 10	Anthony Thornton	Democrat	Absent
Kentucky 1	Lawrence S. Trimble	Democrat	Nay
Michigan 5	Rowland E. Trowbridge	Republican	Yea
Michigan 2	Charles Upson	Republican	Yea
New York 31	Henry Van Aernam	Republican	Yea
New York 29	Burt Van Horn	Republican	Absent
Missouri 6	Robert T. Van Horn	Republican	Absent
Kentucky 6	Andrew H. Ward	Democrat	Nay
New York 27	Hamilton Ward	Republican	Yea
Connecticut 2	Samuel L. Warner	Republican	Yea
Indiana 7	Henry D. Washburn	Republican	Yea
Massachusetts 9	William B. Washburn	Republican	Absent
Illinois 3	Elihu B. Washburne	Republican	Yea
Ohio 14	Martin Welker	Republican	Yea
Illinois 1	John Wentworth	Republican	Yea
West Virginia 3	Kellian Whaley	Unconditional Union	Nay
Pennsylvania 23	Thomas Williams	Republican	Yea
Iowa 1	James F. Wilson	Republican	Yea
Pennsylvania 18	Stephen Fowler Wilson	Republican	Yea
Minnesota 1	William Windom	Republican	Yea
New York 11	Charles H. Winfield	Democrat	Nay
Vermont 1	Frederick E. Woodbridge	Republican	Absent
New Jersey 5	Edwin R. V. Wright	Democrat	Absent
Notes:^α Schuyler Colfax was serving as Speaker of the House. Per House rules, "the Speaker is not required to vote in ordinary legislative proceedings, except when such vote would be decisive or when the House is engaged in voting by ballot."

== Inquiry ==
The resulting inquiry lasted eleven months, saw 89 witnesses interviewed, and saw 1,200 pages of testimony compiled. Among those that appeared before the House Committee on the Judiciary as part of the inquiry were John Covode (who urged impeachment) Joseph Scott Fullerton, Joseph S. Fowler, Edwin Stanton, Lafayette C. Baker, William Barclay Napton, Rufus Saxton, and Thomas W. Conway, and Jeremiah S. Black. Included among those interviewed were men pardoned by Johnson and men he had fired. John Evans and Jerome B. Chaffee gave testimony related to Johnson's veto of a bill for the admission of Colorado as a state.

President Johnson was reported to have been angered by the authorization of the inquiry. He kept secret tabs on the inquiry through the Pinkerton Detective Agency. Per the findings of Hinds’ Precedents of the House of Representatives, it does not appear that Johnson sought to be represented by counsel before the committee during the inquiry.

=== Members of House Committee on the Judiciary during the inquiry ===
==== 39th Congress ====
In the 39th Congress the House Committee on the Judiciary consisted of seven Republicans, one Democrat, and one Unconditional Unionist.

Members of the House Committee on the Judiciary during the 39th United States Congress
Republican Party	Democratic Party	Unconditional Union Party
James F. Wilson, Iowa (committee chair); George S. Boutwell, Massachusetts; Burton C. Cook, Illinois; William Lawrence, Ohio; Daniel Morris, New York; Thomas Williams, Pennsylvania; Frederick E. Woodbridge, Vermont	Sydenham Elnathan Ancona, Pennsylvania	Francis Thomas, Maryland

==== 40th Congress ====
In the 40th Congress, the House Committee on the Judiciary consisted of seven Republicans and two Democrats. All of the committee members from the previous Congress returned to the committee for the 40th Congress, with the two exceptions of Democrat Sydenham Elnathan Ancona and Republican Daniel Morris, who had both departed the United States House of Representatives. In their place were two new committee members, Democrat Charles A. Eldredge and Samuel S. Marshall and Republican John C. Churchill. Committee member Francis Thomas, who had been elected to the previous congress as a member of the Unconditional Union Party, was now elected to the 40th Congress as a member of the Republican Party.

Members of the House Committee on the Judiciary during the 40th United States Congress
Republican Party	Democratic Party
James F. Wilson, Iowa (committee chair); George S. Boutwell, Massachusetts; John C. Churchill, New York; William Lawrence, Ohio; Francis Thomas, Maryland; Thomas Williams, Pennsylvania; Frederick E. Woodbridge, Vermont	Charles A. Eldredge, Wisconsin; Samuel S. Marshall, Illinois

=== Initial investigation during the 39th Congress ===
To comply with Ashley's impeachment resolution, the Judiciary Committee began to slowly conduct an impeachment inquiry, gathering evidence from witnesses in closed sessions.

On January 14, 1867, the resolution that had been proposed by Benjamin F. Loan on the inquiry was established was finally debated by the full House. Loan gave a long speech to the House in which he used language that was largely interpreted as accusing Johnson of complicity in the assassination of President Lincoln, and which further accused him of participation in a conspiracy to capture the United States Government in the interest of those involved in the southern secession. The resolution was again considered on January 28 and February 4 due to a motion by Thomas Jenckes to refer the resolution to the Committee on the Judiciary. This motion to refer Loan's resolution to the committee already tasked with addressing a prospective impeachment was ultimately agreed to by the House.

The allegations of misconduct given in the testimony taken by the committee was largely unsupported by evidence. The committee investigated a myriad of allegations against Johnson. Among the matters investigated and for which testimony was taken was the question of whether Johnson played a role in the removal of eighteen missing pages from Lincoln assassin John Wilkes Booth's personal journal. It was speculated whether these pages might have implicated Johnson in the conspiracy behind the assassination. Another allegation investigated was that Johnson had used intimidation or patronage appointments as influence to prevent the admission of the Colorado territory as a state. The committee also investigated whether Johnson had provided pardons to deserters from West Virginia. It also investigated whether or not the commission for the United States' minister to Sweden had been correctly issued. Another matter investigated was the New Orleans massacre of 1866. Also investigated were allegations of fraud in New York City related to import taxes. One allegation investigated (that Johnson had asked the attorney general of the United States whether he believed the Congress was perhaps illegitimate due to the lack of representation for unreconstructed southern states) turned out to be a story fabricated by a journalist.

The early hearings by the Judiciary Committee were an outlandish affair and were unsuccessful in providing substantive testimony of malfeasance. The Judiciary Committee's first closed-door hearings had been held February 6, 1867, with testimony from Detective Lafayette C. Baker. Baker was famous for having tracked John Wilkes Booth down after Booth assassinated President Lincoln. Baker's testimony set the tone for the series of evidence-devoid allegations that would be delivered in various testimonies, with Baker implication Johnson in several crimes without providing any evidence. He first implicated Johnson in treason, testifying of a wartime letter that he claimed he had once came into possession of on a date he could not recall (but no longer held possession of) which he alleged had been sent from Johnson to Confederate President Jefferson Davis. Baker did not know the contents of the letter. He also declined to disclose who he had received the letter from. However, he testified that he believed that the letter's existence implied that Johnson would "go with" the Confederates. Baker next implicated Johnson with, among other things, involvement with prostitution and bribery. Baker testified about Lucy Cobb, "a disreputable woman, or, in other words, woman of the town" (prostitute), who he had prevented from visiting the White House the previous year. He testified that had disclosed to him that Johnson had secret methods for communicating with "his friends in the South" and that she was herself involved in a trade of selling presidential pardons to confederates.

The committee investigated whether Johnson had improper connections to southerners that had been sold back railroad assets that had been seized by the Union Army during the Civil War. The possibility that corrupt personal favoritism by Johnson had been involved in these sales was explored. However, Secretary of War Edwin Stanton (well-regarded by Radical Republicans) took responsibility for these sales. Stanton told the committee that he believed the sales were justified because the federal government did not have the know-how needed to successfully run the railroads and the nation's post-war economic recovery required that the railroads be placed into the management of individuals who had the knowledge to successfully operate them.

The Judiciary Committee ran out of time to complete its inquiry, with the 39th Congress expiring, However, the committee ruled that they had received "sufficient testimony" to continue their investigation in the new 40th Congress. March 2, 1867, two days before the end of the 39th congress, the committee recommended that the matter be further reviewed in the next congress, with committee member James F. Wilson presenting this recommendation to the whole of congress. The full House was then read the committee's majority report which argued that, in the expiring hours of the 39th congress, no affirmative report could be properly considered, and opined that it was "inexpedient to submit any conclusion," with the committee having not fully investigated all charges against the president. This report had been approved by the committee's Republican chairman James F. Wilson, as well as Republican committee members George S. Boutwell, Burton C. Cook, William Lawrence, Daniel Morris, Thomas Williams, and Frederick E. Woodbridge and Unconditional Unionist committee member Francis Thomas. The sole Democratic committee member, Sydenham Elnathan Ancona, submitted a minority report against a continuation of the inquiry. Both reports were ordered printed and laid on the table.

=== 40th Congress' renewal of the inquiry ===
The 40th Congress consented to the recommendation that the Judiciary Committee made near the end of the 39th Congress, and ordered the committee to continue its inquiry. At the start of the 40th Congress, Congressman Benjamin Buter unsuccessfully urged the Republican caucus to create a special panel to continue the impeachment inquiry. But Congressman James Mitchell Ashley managed to successfully have the inquiry continue in the Judiciary Committee.

On March 7, 1867, the third day of the 40th Congress, Ashley introduced a resolution calling for the impeachment investigation by the Judiciary Committee to be continue.

The resolution read,

Whereas the House of Representatives of the thirty-ninth Congress adopted on 7th of January, 1867, a resolution authorizing an inquiry into certain charges preferred against the President of the United States; and whereas the Judiciary Committee, to whom said resolution and charges were referred, with authority to investigate the same, were unable for want of time to complete said investigation before the expiration of the thirty-ninth Congress; and whereas in the report submitted by said Judiciary Committee on the 2d of March, they declared that the evidence taken is of such a character as to justify and demand a continuation of the investigation by this Congress: Therefore,
Be it resolved by the House of Representatives, That the Judiciary Committee, when appointed, be, and they are hereby, instructed to continue the investigation authorized in said resolution of January 7, 1867, and that they have power to send for persons and papers, and to administer the customary oath to witnesses, and that the committee shall have authority to sit during the sessions of the House, and during any recess which Congress or this House may take.
Resolved, that the Speaker of the House be requested to appoint the Committee on the Judiciary forthwith and that the committee so appointed be directed to take charge of the testimony taken by the committee of the last Congress; and that said committee have power to appoint a clerk at a compensation not to exceed six dollars per day, and employ the necessary stenographer.
Resolved further, That the Clerk of the House of Representatives be directed to pay out of the contingent fund of the House, on the order of the committee on the Judiciary, such sum or sums of money as may be required to enable the said committee to prosecute the investigation above directed, and such other investigations as it may be ordered to make.

John Covode proposed an amendment to the resolution that was understood to have been authored by Benjamin Butler. The amendment would have instead had the continuation of the inquiry be run by a select committee of thirteen members on which the seven members of the Judiciary Committee would all serve. John F. Farnsworth argued against this, arguing that the inquiry should continue to be run through the Judiciary Committee. Citing precedents in the Parliament of the United Kingdom, and declaring that no insult was intended to the Judiciary Committee, Butler argued in favor of a special committee overseeing the inquiry. James G. Blaine argued against moving the inquiry to a special committee, arguing that doing so would be considered a rebuke to the Judiciary Committee. John Martin Broomall voiced similar opposition. John A. Logan voiced support for a special committee, arguing that the Judiciary Committee had no prescriptive right to be handling the matter. John Bingham countered Logan's argument by claiming that, in the eight precedents of federal impeachment cases in the United States, all but one had seen the matter referred to the Judiciary Committee, and that the one exception had led to a ridiculous blunder. After this debate, an overwhelming majority voted to reject the proposed amendment.

The House adopted Ashley's resolution to renew the investigation without any opposition after both debate and the defeat (by 33–119) of a motion to table it.

Right after the 40th Congress voted to reauthorize the impeachment inquiry, Speaker Colfax appointed the membership of a number of House committees, including the Committee on the Judiciary. Butler, a strong proponent of impeachment, unsuccessfully requested to be added to the Judiciary Committee, but John Bingham strongly objected to this.

=== Continued investigation in the 40th Congress ===
The 40th Congress' House Committee on the Judiciary resumed the inquiry started by the committee in the previous congress. They held month of closed-door hearings.

Johnson and his allies grew more and more frustrated with the impeachment inquiry, which kept expanding in scope. When the committee began investigating Johnson's finances, Johnson irately reacted,

I have had a son killed, a son-in-law die during the last battle at Nashville, another son has thrown himself away, a second son-in law is in no better condition. I think I have sorrow enough without having my bank account examined by a committee of Congress."

In March 1867, Radical Republicans, dissatisfied with the slow pace of the inquiry, attempted to bypass that process outlined in Ashley's resolution and instead secure Republican caucus approval for immediate impeachment. John Bingham and James F. Wilson (the chairman of the House Committee on the Judiciary) killed this effort by the Radical Republicans. By mid-1867, impeachment was regularly promoted by chief opponents of Johnson in Congress.

=== Judiciary Committee vote against impeachment (June 1867) ===
On June 3, 1867, in a 5–4 vote, the committee voted against sending an impeachment resolution to the full House, with three moderate Republican members joining two Democratic members of the committee in voting against doing so. They, however, also voted in support of censuring Johnson. On July 10, 1867, James F. Wilson reported verbally on behalf of the committee, by its direction, that they anticipated being able to report on or after October 16. He also stated that, as it then stood, five members were of the opinion that high crimes and misdemeanors warranting impeachment had not occurred, while the remaining four members believed that they had. It appeared that Johnson had successfully avoided impeachment.

House Judiciary Committee vote sending on an impeachment resolution to the full House
June 3, 1867	Party		Total votes
June 3, 1867	Democratic	Republican	Total votes
Yea	0	4	4
Nay	2	3	5

Vote by member
District	Member	Party	Vote
Massachusetts 7	George S. Boutwell	Republican	Yea
New York 22	John C. Churchill	Republican	Nay
Wisconsin 4	Charles A. Eldredge	Democrat	Nay
Ohio 4	William Lawrence	Republican	Yea
Illinois 11	Samuel S. Marshall	Democrat	Nay
Maryland 4	Francis Thomas	Republican	Yea
Pennsylvania 23	Thomas Williams	Republican	Yea
Vermont 1	Frederick E. Woodbridge	Republican	Nay
Iowa 1	James F. Wilson	Republican	Nay

=== Inquiry resumed, Johnson antagonizes Republicans ===
The House Committee on the Judiciary had not delivered a report to the full congress, meaning that they had not yet formally closed their inquiry. Johnson would undertake actions that further antagonized Republicans. This would ultimately cause increased Republican anxiety over Johnson's obstruction and lead to the Judiciary Committee reversing their majority stance on impeachment. The first of these actions came when Henry Stanbery (the attorney general of the United States) issued at the request of Johnson a legal opinion which, combined with an earlier opinion issued at the request of Johnson in March, put forth an interoperation of the law that decreased the power of military district commanders in the South. The Reconstruction Acts that had been passed over the vetoes of Johnson had created five military districts in the South and had given broad powers to the commanders of those districts to enforce the Reconstruction Acts. However, the attorney general's legal opinions found that the commanders had no power to remove local officials who acted against congressional policies. The legal opinion also undermined restrictions on former confederates voting.

The committee would resume collecting evidence for the impeachment inquiry. On July 17, 1867, the House agreed to an amended version of a resolution by John Covode that instructed the House Committee on the Judiciary to, in their investigation, inquire into new a charge levied against the president. The new charge was that Johnson had, allegedly at the request of Lincoln assassination conspirator John Surratt's counsel, given a full pardon to Confederate Stephen F. Cameron. The resolution instructed the committee to look into this action, which it declared would demonstrate Johnson's "sympathy with the men who murdered the President" if true. The resolution also instructed the committee to, in the first week of the second session of the 40th Congress, report evidence to the House on this together with the testimony already collected in the impeachment inquiry. The second session of the 40th Congress would begin on December 2, 1867.

Over the 1867 summer congressional recess (which lasted from July 21 through November 20, 1867), sentiments among Republicans shifted further with more Republicans coming to side in favor of impeachment due to continued acts by Johnson that antagonized Republicans. One such act was Johnson's suspension of Secretary of War Edwin Stanton and replacement of him with Ulysses S. Grant as secretary of war ad interim on August 12, 1867, taking advantage of a loophole in the Tenure of Office Act created by the Senate being in recess. Another act was Johnson's subsequent firing of Generals Philip Sheridan (who had been in charge of Texas and Louisiana), which was soon followed by his firing of Daniel Sickles (who had been in charge of North Carolina and South Carolina) on August 12, 1867, which further contributed to Republican furor. Johnson had fired them against Grant's advice. Both Sheridan and Sickles had acted in their offices to protect policies extending civil rights to African Americans.

During an 1867 summer meeting, held in response to provocative actions taken by Johnson, more conservative Republicans were able to kill an effort by Radical Republicans to call for an October session of congress dealing with impeachment. This effort, led by Radical Republican Representatives George S. Boutwell, Benjamin Butler, and Thaddeus Stevens and Senators Charles D. Drake and Charles Sumner would have ended the 1867 summer congressional recess. The promoters of this hoped that they could act against intrigue by Johnson and continue to push for his impeachment in the special session. However, Conservative Republicans, led by Representatives John Bingham and James G. Blaine and Senators Lyman Trumbull and William P. Fessenden succeeded in blocking this effort.

In October 1867, rumors had been published in newspapers that the committee's stance on impeachment had changed. The rumors were characterized as baseless by two of the three moderate Republicans that had previously voted against impeachment. Rumors particularly focused on Churchill and Wilson as individuals that had changed their positions. These were fueled by pro-impeachment committee member William Lawrence claiming to the press that it was true that two non-specified members had switched their positions to now favor impeachment. However, on October 25, John C. Churchill released a statement in which he denied have shared with anyone anything that indicated that he had changed his mind. On October 31, James F. Wilson denied rumors that he had written a correspondence declaring favor for sending an impeachment resolution to the full House. However, Wilson did not indicate his position. Because the Judiciary Committee left its proceedings confidential, when Congress reconvened after the recess, most congressmen were still under the belief that the pending majority report would be against impeachment, just as the committee had previously sided in their earlier July vote.

=== Judiciary Committee vote in favor of impeachment (November 1867) ===
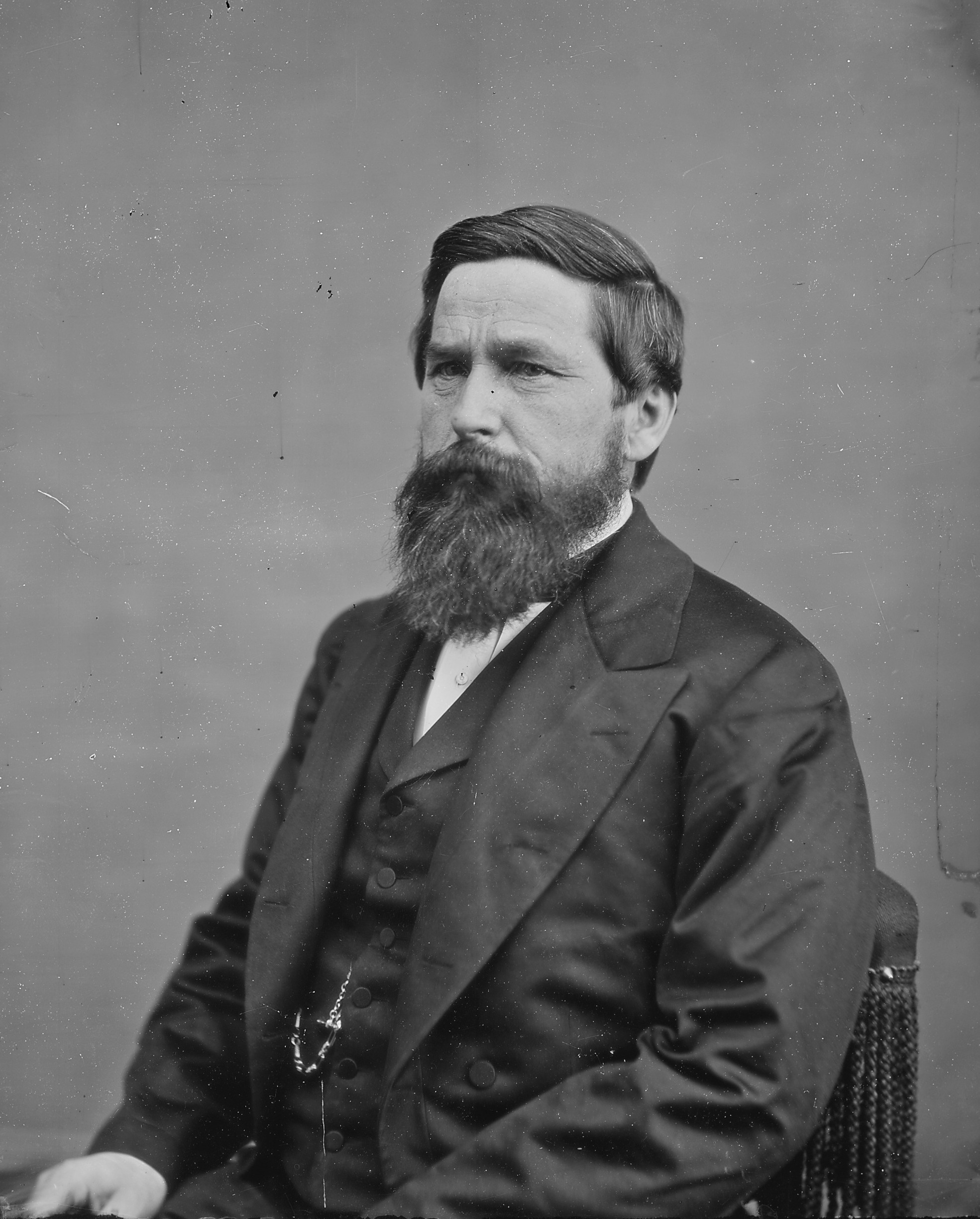
John C. Churchill's change of vote moved the Judiciary Committee 5–4 in favor of impeachment

Despite having stated in October that he had given nobody any indication of a change of mind, in actuality, John C. Churchill had indeed changed his mind in favor of impeachment by the time Congress' recess ended in November. Consequentially, on November 25, 1867, the House Committee on the Judiciary voted in a 5–4 vote to recommend impeachment proceedings, and to submit its report to the House. The majority approved a resolution which read, "Resolved, That Andrew Johnson, President of the United States, be impeached of high crimes and misdemeanors." The minority on the committee that opposed impeachment had instead proposed ending the inquiry without an impeachment resolution by sending instead the House a resolution that would have read, "Resolved, That the Committee on the Judiciary be discharged from the further consideration of the proposed impeachment of the President of the United States, and that the subject be laid upon the table."

House Judiciary Committee vote on recommending impeachment and sending an impeachment resolution to the full House
November 25, 1867	Party		Total votes
November 25, 1867	Democratic	Republican	Total votes
Yea	0	5	5
Nay	2	2	4

Vote by member
District	Member	Party	Vote
Massachusetts 7	George S. Boutwell	Republican	Yea
New York 22	John C. Churchill	Republican	Yea
Wisconsin 4	Charles A. Eldredge	Democrat	Nay
Ohio 4	William Lawrence	Republican	Yea
Illinois 11	Samuel S. Marshall	Democrat	Nay
Maryland 4	Francis Thomas	Republican	Yea
Pennsylvania 23	Thomas Williams	Republican	Yea
Vermont 1	Frederick E. Woodbridge	Republican	Nay
Iowa 1	James F. Wilson	Republican	Nay

After the committee vote became public, Churchill published a lengthy letter in The New York Times explaining the reason for his change of mind, writing in part,

The President in the exercise of his constitutional powers, by such changes of military commanders, or such withdrawal of troops from the reconstructed States, or such other acts as should destroy the confidence of loyalists and freedmen in prompt military protection in the exercise of their suffrage, at any time before the new State Governments shall have been established, and shall have set in operation a machinery of their own for the protection of their citizens, would make it impossible to carry a single Southern State in accordance with the views of a majority of Congress.

=== Committee reports ===
The committee submitted three reports to the full House, a majority report and two dissenting minority reports.

==== Majority report ====
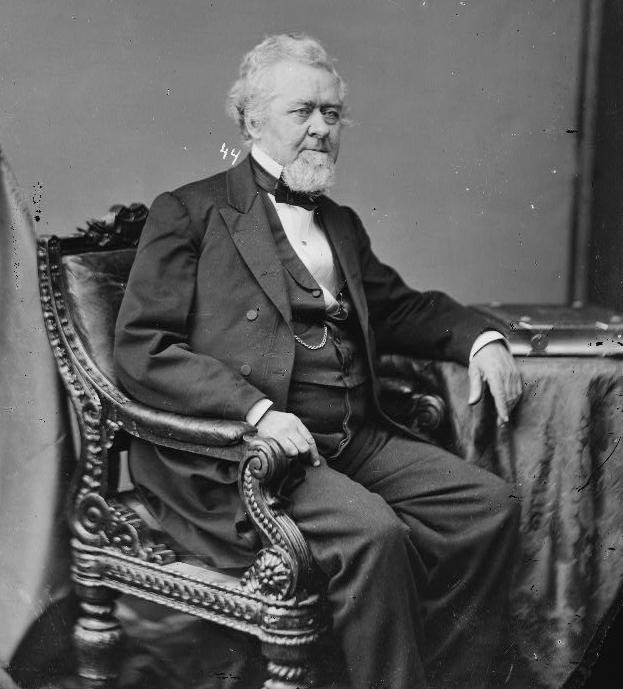
Thomas Williams wrote the committee's majority report in favor of impeachment

The majority report in favor of impeachment was written by Radical Republican committee member Thomas Williams and listed seventeen instances in which he argued Johnson had reached the threshold of impeachment. The report wrote that the primary issue to fault Johnson with was, "the great salient point of accusation, standing out in the foreground, and challenging the attention of the country, is the usurpation of power, which involves, of course, a violation of law." He argued that Johnson had undermined Congress.

The majority report was poorly written, with an unfocused and rambling style that undermined what valid points it made. Harper's Weekly opined that it did not, "inspire general confidence". The Chicago Tribune, which was sympathetic to the Radical Republican cause, even opined that the charges made in it were, "inferential and circumstantial". The New York Times believed that the report actually helped the president by debunking persistent rumors that he had been involved in the conspiracy to assassinate Lincoln.

The report characterized Johnson as having undermined the United States Congress with the intent of empowering the former Southern rebels. In the Report, Williams wrote that Johnson had been acting in the interest of,

The one great the purpose of reconstructing the shattered governments of the Rebel states in accordance with his own will, in the interests of the great criminals who carried them into the rebellion, and in such a way as to deprive the people of the loyal States of all chances of indemnity for the past or security for the future.

The report alleged that Johnson had acted in the interest of empowering the former Southern rebels,

By pardoning their offenses, resorting lands, and bringing them back, their hearts unrepentant, and their hands yet red with the blood of our people, into a condition where they could once more embarrass and defy, if not absolutely rule the government in which they had vainly endeavored to destroy.

The report characterized the alleged intent of Johnson to empower the former Southern rebels in such a manner as being, "the great master-key which unlocks and interprets all of....[Johnson's] special acts of mal-administration."

The report levied the following seventeen charges against Johnson:

1. That Johnson, "assuming it to be his duty to execute the constitutional guaranty," had worked to (without the consent of the legislature) provide new governments for the former Confederate states as he pleased, and sought, "to force them into the Union against the will of Congress and the people of the loyal States, by the authority and patronage of his high office."
2. That Johnson had committed malfeasance by,
  1. Creating offices not provisioned for under the law, and appointing "men who were notoriously disqualified to take the test oath" to those offices without the advice and consent of the United States Senate.
  2. Acting, "in clear violation of law," by using funds belonging to the United States Department of War to pay for the expenses of his own work and for salaries (at rates he had decided upon) of the holders of aforementioned non-provisioned offices.
3. That Johnson had ordered those he appointed to positions that he created to appropriate government property and to levy taxes, "from the conquered people" to pay expenses related to their offices.
4. That Johnson had "without equivalent" returned railroads and rolling stock that the Union Army had captured to their former Confederate stockholders and had, at great government expense, constructed and renovated Southern railroads.
5. That Johnson had,
  1. "Without authority of law", sold the aforementioned railroad stockholders "at a private valuation, and on a long credit, without any security whatever" a large amount of rolling stock and machinery that had been purchased by and belonged to the United States government.
  2. Following numerous defaults by those he had sold this rolling stock and machinery to, helped to allow them to pay debt they owed to other creditors by postponing their debt due to the United States government.
  3. Issued arrears of interest on a large amount of bonds of the companies guaranteed by the State of Tennessee, which Johnson himself held a large amount of.
6. That Johnson had,
  1. Given back former Confederate owners large amounts of cotton and other property that had been seized by the United States Treasury
  2. Worked to pay back proceeds of actual sales of such property, "in utter contempt of the law" by directing the Treasury to make such payments and by directing the aggrieved parties to seek remedy in the Courts, thereby violating "the true meaning and spirit" of the Constitutional clause containing the language that, "no money shall be drawn from the treasury but in consequences of appropriations made by law."
7. That Johnson had "to the great detriment of the public" abused his pardon powers by releasing "the most active and formidable" leaders of the Confederacy, and had sought to restore to them their property and means of influence in the hopes of receiving their assistance in furthering his policy. Also that, Johnson had also been "substantially delegating that power for the same objects to his provisional governors."
8. The Johnson had abused his pardon powers in issuing the simultaneous full pardons of 193 deserters, and the restoring of their "justly forfeited claims" to arrears of pay from the Government, and that Johnson had done this without proper inquiry or sufficient evidence.
9. That Johnson had,
  1. "Refused to enforce the laws passed by Congress for the suppression of the rebellion, and punishment of those who gave it comfort and support," in directing proceedings against delinquents and their property
  2. Completely "obstructed the course of public justice," by either prohibiting the start of such legal proceedings or (if they had already commenced) staying them indefinitely or ordering the absolute discontinuance of such proceedings.
10. That Johnson had, "further obstructed the course of public imprisonment" for Clement Claiborne Clay ("an important state prisoner"), had forbidden Clay's arrest in proceedings instituted against him for treason and conspiracy in the State of Alabama, and had ordered property that had been seized from Clay by a United States district attorney to be restored to him.
11. That Johnson had abused his Constitutional appointment power by,
  1. Removing, "on system and to the great prejudice of public," a large number of "meritorious public officers" solely because they refused to support Johnson's claim that he had a right to reorganize and restore the former Confederate states on his own terms, and because they had instead favored honoring, "the jurisdiction and authority of Congress" on such matters.
  2. Making recess appointments of people that he had previously nominated for office, and whose previous nominations been rejected by the United States Senate.
12. That Johnson had, against the law, exercised powers to dispense by commissioning individuals who were "notoriously disqualified by their participation in the rebellion from taking the oath of office required by act of Congress" as revenue officers and to offices that had not been legislatively provided for, and had allowed them to take such offices and exercise their duties, and paid them salaries for their work.
13. That Johnson had, in accordance with his public declaration that he, "would veto all measures whenever they came to him", systematically vetoed, "all important measures of Congress looking to the reorganization and restoration of rebel States." That he had done so with, "no other reasons than a determination to prevent the exercise of the undoubted power and jurisdiction of Congress over a question that was cognizable exclusively by them."
14. That Johnson had, "brought the patronage of his office into conflict the with freedom of elections," by permitting and encouraging his official retainers to travel the nation, attending political convention and addressing crowds instead of performing the jobs they were receiving "high salaries" for.
15. That Johnson had, "exerted all the influence of his position" to prevent the residents of the former Confederate states from accepting terms that Congress had offered them, and had "neutralized to a large extend the effects of the national victory by impressing them with the opinion that the Congress of the United States was bloodthirsty and implacable and that their only hope was in adhering to him."
16. That Johnson had,
  1. Through his, "undue tenderness and transparent partiality" to Confederates caused widespread, "oppression and bloodshed".
  2. Encouraged New Orleans massacre of 1866 ("the murder of loyal citizens in New Orleans by a Confederate mob pretending to act as a police") through hireling correspondence with its leaders.
  3. Encouraged the New Orleans massacre of 1866 by denouncing "the exercise of the constitutional right of a political convention to assemble peacefully in that city" as being an act of treason for which violent suppression was justified
  4. Encouraged the New Orleans massacre of 1866 by commanding the military to assist in forcing the dispersal of those attending the convention, rather than preventing the forced dispersal of convention attendees.
17. That Johnson was, "guilty of acts calculated, if not intended, to subvert the Government of the United States by denying that the Thirty-ninth Congress was a constitutional body and fostering a spirit of disaffection and disobedience to the law and rebellion against its authority by endeavoring. in public speeches, to bring it to odium and contempt."

==== Minority reports ====
One minority report was agreed to by the two Democratic members (Marshall and Eldredge), while the other was agreed to by the two moderate Republicans that had voted against recommending impeachment (Woodbridge and Wilson).

The Democratic minority report, was written by Marshall, and dissented from all criticism of Johnson. The Republican minority report, written by Wilson, wrote that, while they were against impeachment, they believed Johnson, "deserves the censure and condemnation of every well-disposed citizen." It argued that the Congress should wait and let Americans remove Johnson from office in the 1868 presidential election. It declared that Johnson, "has disappointed the hopes and expectations of those who placed him in power. He had betrayed their confidence and joined hands with their enemies." However it also declared, "judge him politically, we must condemn him. But the day of political impeachments would be a sad one for this country.". In the report, Wilson also wrote that, "political unfitness and incapacity must be tried at the ballot box, not in the high court of impeachment."

The Republican minority report argued that impeachment required a criminal offense and that, in impeachment trials, the Senate acted as a court, "of special criminal jurisdiction," and therefore needed to follow legal forms. He argued that impeachment trials were not to be political procedures. Without evidence, he argued that judicial rules of evidence were required to be applied in Senate impeachment trials and that, in such trials, the Senate could only be able to try offenses, "known to the Constitution, or to the laws of the United States." Wilson made weak arguments in support of this, often using incomplete logic. Wilson's Republican majority report also gave effective rebuttals of the factual charges issued in the majority report.

While the majority report had found American precedents to support its position that impeachment did not require a legal crime to be committed, Wilson argued the practical considerations of this theory in the Republican minority report. He voiced concern that, if impeachment were entirely a political process, it might mean that a president could be impeached merely for policies that are unpopular with their opponents.

=== Reporting of the impeachment resolution, majority and minority reports, and testimony to the House ===
Later on November 25, 1867, on behalf of the committee, Boutwell submitted to the House the majority report and the impeachment resolution. It was only then that those not on the committee learned that the committee had decided to support impeachment. The impeachment resolution reported by the committee simply read, "Resolved, That Andrew Johnson, President of the United States, be impeached of high crimes and misdemeanors."

Boutwell then submitted to the House the testimony taken by the committee in its inquiry. After this, the minority reports were submitted by James F. Wilson and Samuel S. Marshall The House then approved a motion by Boutwell to have the reports printed together and to postpone further consideration of the subject of impeachment until December 4, 1867. It was only after the reports were published that those not on the committee on found out that the change of vote in the House Committee on the Judiciary was due to Churchill having changed his stance on impeachment.

== House defeat of the impeachment resolution ==
On December 5, 1867, the House brought the Committee on the Judiciary's impeachment recommendation to the floor for consideration, and discussion was thereafter held on the impeachment resolution reported by the Judiciary Committee, with George S. Boutwell presenting a case for impeachment and James F. Wilson presenting a case against it.

While conservative Republicans were confident that they would defeat impeachment, Radical Republicans were confident that they could succeed in securing impeachment. However, in the Judiciary Committee's vote, two of the committee's seven Republican members (each being two of the committee's three moderate Republicans) had opposed impeachment. This underscored the reality that Republicans remained divided on whether Johnson had committed conduct worthy of impeachment, with many moderate Republicans still having little appetite for an impeachment.

At the time, there was a disagreement between Radical Republicans and conservative Republicans as to what constituted a "high crime and misdemeanor", which, along with treason and bribery constituted the sole grounds for which impeachment was allowed under the United States Constitution. Conservatives supported the theory put forth by the defense in a number of earlier federal impeachments that government officials only could be impeached for what constituted an indictable violation of criminal statutes or common law. Their support for this theory at that time largely arose from fears for the institutional and political effects impeachment would have on the nation's stability. Radical Republicans, on the other hand, believed in a more broad view on what "high crimes and misdemeanors" encompassed, believing that the nation's framers had intended for "malfeasance, nonfeasance, and, in some cases, misfeasance," to be the subject of impeachment. They cited English precedents, earlier American impeachments, and a great consensus among most early nineteenth century American constitutional commentators to support this view. They also cited the views of the likes of early American legal scholars such as William Duer, James Kent, William Rawle, and Joseph Story, as well as the authors of The Federalist Papers.

=== George S. Boutwell's argument in support of impeachment ===
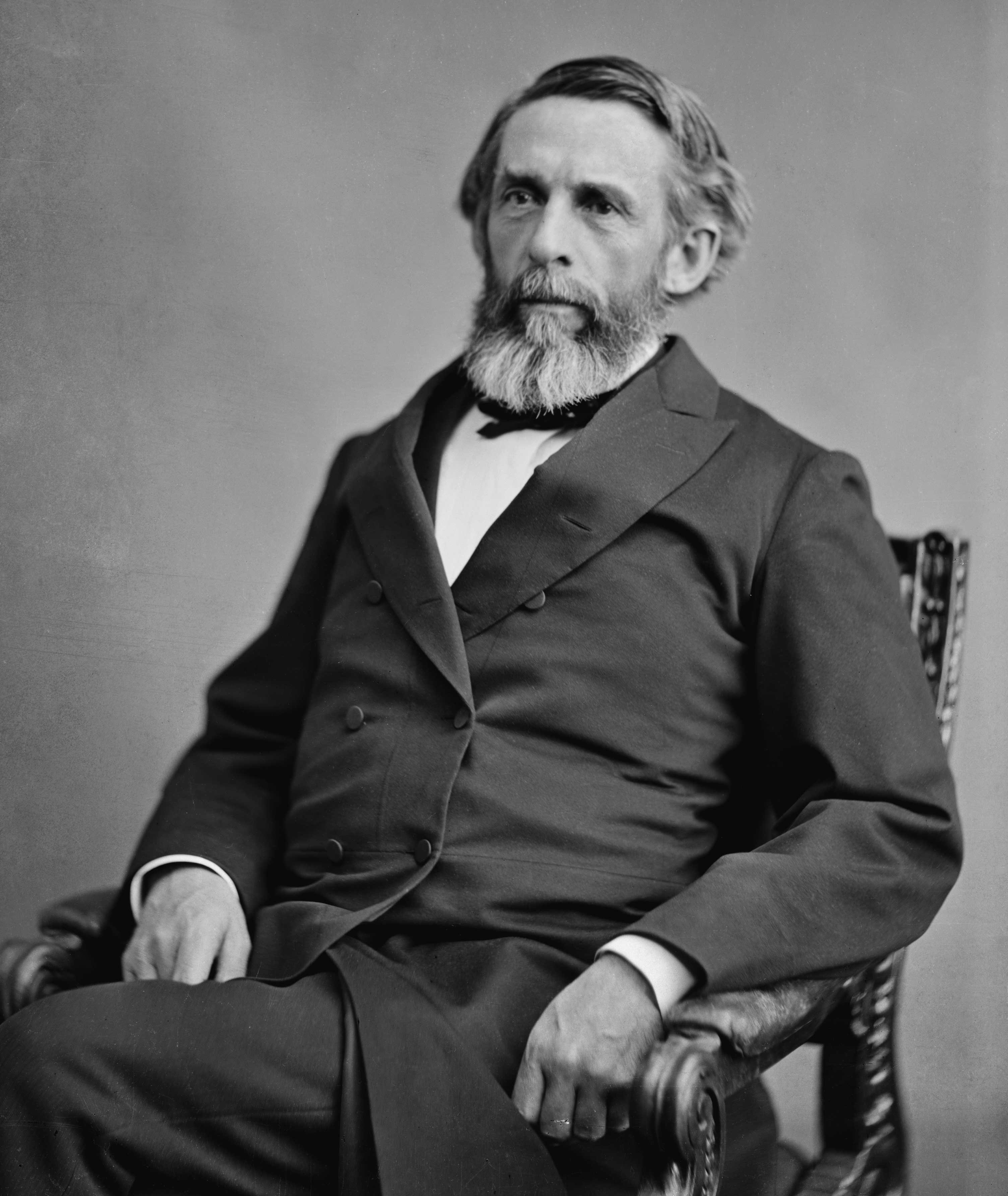
George S. Boutwell delivered the argument in favor of impeachment

The House Committee on the Judiciary's Radical Republicans selected, from their ranks, to have George S. Boutwell argue the case for impeachment to the house. He made a four-hour presentation, stretched over two legislative days (December 5 and 6, 1867), which historian Michael Les Benedict later described as, "the clearest, most eloquent, and most convincing argument for the liberal view of the impeachment power". His speech largely focused on the question of whether the president's activities were legally impeachable. The speech lasted two hours.

Boutwell argued that there needed to be a broad interpretation of impeachment powers. He assailed the notion that impeachment required a clear violation of the law to be applied. Instead, citing British precedent and debates from the Constitutional Convention, he argued that impeachment was intended to be used in instances where public trust had been violated, and that impeachment was to be used when an officer refused to "faithfully execute" their office. He argued that America could not wait until the next presidential election to remove an unsuitable president. Boutwell argued that impeachment power, "is subject to no revision or control", but is rather solely to be guided by the judgement of the House of Representatives.

Boutwell also argued that Johnson had committed flagrant misdeeds that approached criminality in his subversion of the law and refusal to uphold the law, and therefore his actions had been clearly impeachable. He cited Johnson's veto of the Reconstruction Acts which the congress had overwhelmingly passed. He cited Johnson's urging for southern states under federal control to refuse to ratify the Fourteenth Amendment to the United States Constitution. He also cited Johnson's creation of provisional governorships without authorization, and appointment of provisional governors that Boutwell claimed were ineligible to take official loyalty oaths due to their participation in the Confederacy. Citing these and other actions, Boutwell alleged that Johnsons actions were intended to return Confederates to power in the state and national governments against the judgement of Congress. Boutwell argued, "can there be any doubt as to his purpose, or doubt as to the criminality of his purpose and his respojnsibility under the Constitution?"

Boutwell also framed a portion of his argument around the notion that impeachment could stop Johnson from interfering in the southern states during the 1868 presidential election, citing specific concerns that Johnson could suppress the vote of African Americans.

Boutwell argued,

"To this House is given under the Constitution the sole power of impeachment; and this power of impeachment furnishes the only means by which we can secure the execution of the laws, and those of our fellow-citizens who desire the administration of the law ought to sustain this House while it executes the great law which is in its hands and which is nowhere else, while it is performing a high and solemn duty resting upon it by which that man who has been the chief violator of the law shall be removed, and without which there can be no execution of the law anywhere. ... If we neglect or refuse to use our powers when the case arises demanding decisive action, the Government ceases to be a Government of laws and becomes a Government of men."

=== James F. Wilson's argument against impeachment ===
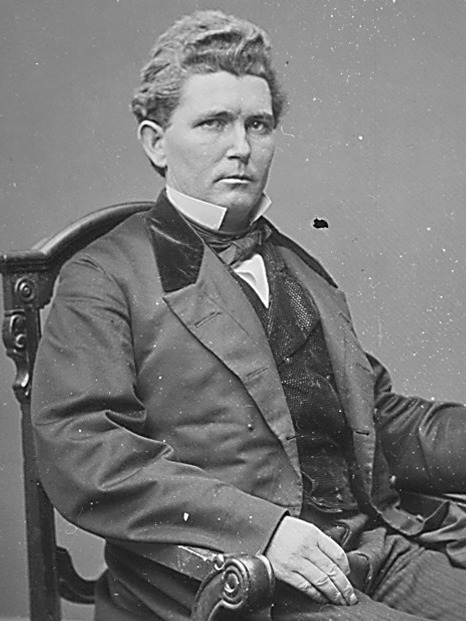
House Committee on the Judiciary chairman James F. Wilson delivered the argument against impeachment

After Boutwell's presentation, James F. Wilson, chairman of the House Committee on the Judiciary took to the floor to argue against impeachment. Wilson argued that while Johnson was the "worst of presidents", his opposition to the positions of the Republican Party was not illegal. Wilson argued that, despite Boutwell's assertion that it did, the House did not have lone authority to determine what constitutes an "impeachable offense". Wilson warned that a broad interpretation of impeachment powers, as Boutwell championed, in theory could allow the House to effectively dictate the policy of presidents. He spent half of his speech arguing that impeachment was only reserved for indictable crimes, and the other half attacking those who opposed this position.

Wilson characterized the part of Boutwell's argument that had argued impeachment could stop Johnson from interfering in the southern states during the 1868 presidential election as Boutwell effectively arguing the House should be allowed to impeach Johnson for something he could do, rather than some thing he had done. Wilson argued, "this would lead us even beyond the conscience of this house."

Wilson also argued that much of Boutwell's argument was inconsistent with the majority committee report. Indeed, Boutwell's speech had a number of inconsistencies with the case made in the majority report. Boutwell's speech, at one point, had dismissed English precedents as irrelevant to impeachment under the United States constitution, despite the fact that the majority report cited English precedents. Boutwell had also argued against the minority's stance by characterizing their view as one under which an officer who committed murder in such a manner that they would be outside of United States court jurisdiction would be immune to impeachment. However, the majority report had explicitly stated a belief that murder would not be an impeachable offense, as it would not directly relate to officeholding. Michael Les Benedict has opined, "Wilson's blunt analysis of the inconstancies between Boutwell's brilliant speech and William's mediocre report did tremendous damage to the impeachers' case."

In his closing remarks Wilson asked, "if we cannot arraign the president for a specific crime, for what are we to proceed against him?...If we cannot state upon paper a specific crime, how are we to carry this case to the Senate for a trial?"

=== House vote on the impeachment resolution ===
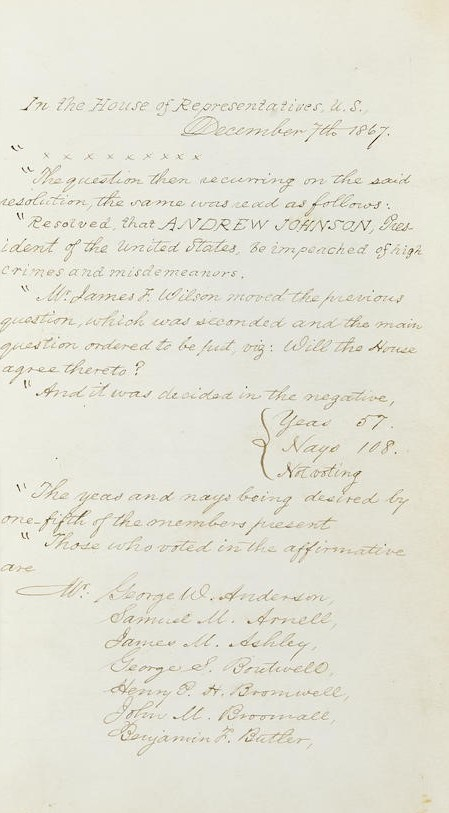
A copy of a record recording the vote

After finishing his speech on December 6, 1867, Wilson motioned to lay the resolution on the table. This motion angered the many Radical Republicans that had prepared speeches of their own on the question of impeachment and felt that a successful motion to table would allow Republicans to evade the question of impeachment, going without a direct vote on the matter. Several Radical Republicans filibustered the motion. On December 7, 1867, Radical Republicans reached a quid pro quo agreement with Wilson in which they would end their filibuster and he would withdraw his motion to table the resolution in return for the House proceeding immediately to a vote on the resolution, rather than allowing further debate. As a result of this, general debate was not permitted on the resolution before it was voted on, with debate instead being limited to the speeches that had been delivered by Boutwell and Wilson.

On December 7 the House voted against impeachment by a margin of 57–108, with 66 Republicans, 39 Democrats, and one member congressmen of other party affiliations voting against impeachment; and with all votes for impeachment coming from Republicans. 22 members of congress were absent (17 Republicans, 4 Democrats, and 1 independent Republican). Speaker Schuyler Colfax (a Republican) did not vote, as House rules do not require the speaker to vote during ordinary legislative proceedings, unless their vote would be decisive or if the vote is being cast by ballot.

One motivating factor for Republicans' decision to vote against impeachment may have been the successes Democrats had in the 1867 elections. In Connecticut's April 1 election, Democrats had won the governorship and three of the state's four House seats, marking the Republican Party's first losses in a Northern state since 1864. As the year went on, the Democratic party would enjoy several other successes, including winning control of the Ohio General Assembly (which would give the party choice over who the state would send to the senate in 1869). In addition to this Democratic partisan electoral successes, it was also alarming to Republicans that Connecticut, Minnesota, New York, and Ohio all rejected propositions to grant African Americans suffrage by large margins. In 1867, Republicans only improved upon their 1866 election performances in the states of Michigan and Kentucky. The remaining eighteen states that held elections saw Republicans lose sizable ground over the previous year. Republicans were particularly concerned at the fact that their party had only managed a very narrow margin-of-victory in the 1867 Ohio gubernatorial election.

Michael Les Benedict has suggested that as a result of poor 1867 election results, within the Republican caucus, "the centrists, who might have favored impeachment had the elections demonstrated radical strength," were left, "divided, most of them opposing impeachment."

Michael Les Benedict's analysis shows correlation between congressmen's votes in this impeachment vote and voting records in the 40th Congress votes on the matter of currency expansion, as well as voting records on Reconstruction issues during the 39th Congress.

House vote on the impeachment resolution
December 7, 1867	Party					Total votes
December 7, 1867	Democratic	Republican	Conservatives	Conservative Republicans	Independent Republicans	Total votes
Yea	0	57	0	0	0	57
Nay	39	66	1	1	1	108

Comparative bar chart
Vote	Vote total
"Yea" votes	57
"Nay" votes	108
Absent/not voting	23

Vote by member
District	Member	Party	Vote
Kentucky 8	George Madison Adams	Democrat	Nay
Iowa 3	William B. Allison	Republican	Nay
Massachusetts 2	Oakes Ames	Republican	Nay
Missouri 9	George Washington Anderson	Republican	Yea
Maryland 2	Stevenson Archer	Democrat	Nay
Tennessee 6	Samuel Mayes Arnell	Republican	Yea
Nevada at-large	Delos R. Ashley	Republican	Nay
Ohio 10	James Mitchell Ashley	Republican	Yea
California 1	Samuel Beach Axtell	Democrat	Nay
New York 21	Alexander H. Bailey	Republican	Nay
Illinois 12	Jehu Baker	Republican	Nay
Massachusetts 8	John Denison Baldwin	Republican	Nay
Massachusetts 6	Nathaniel P. Banks	Republican	Nay
New York 2	Demas Barnes	Democrat	Absent
Connecticut 4	William Henry Barnum	Democrat	Nay
Michigan 1	Fernando C. Beaman	Republican	Nay
Kentucky 7	James B. Beck	Democrat	Nay
Missouri 8	John F. Benjamin	Republican	Nay
New Hampshire 3	Jacob Benton	Republican	Nay
Ohio 16	John Bingham	Republican	Nay
Maine 3	James G. Blaine	Republican	Nay
Michigan 3	Austin Blair	Republican	Absent
Massachusetts 7	George S. Boutwell	Republican	Yea
Pennsylvania 6	Benjamin Markley Boyer	Democrat	Nay
Illinois 7	Henry P. H. Bromwell	Republican	Yea
New York 8	James Brooks	Democrat	Nay
Pennsylvania 7	John Martin Broomall	Republican	Yea
Ohio 9	Ralph Pomeroy Buckland	Republican	Nay
Illinois 10	Albert G. Burr	Democrat	Nay
Massachusetts 5	Benjamin Butler	Republican	Yea
Pennsylvania 10	Henry L. Cake	Republican	Absent
Ohio 2	Samuel Fenton Cary	Independent Republican	Nay
New York 7	John Winthrop Chanler	Democrat	Nay
New York 22	John C. Churchill	Republican	Yea
Ohio 6	Reader W. Clarke	Republican	Yea
Kansas at-large	Sidney Clarke	Republican	Yea
Wisconsin 3	Amasa Cobb	Republican	Yea
Indiana 6	John Coburn	Republican	Yea
Indiana 9	Schuyler Colfax	Republican	Did not vote (speaker)^{α}
Illinois 6	Burton C. Cook	Republican	Nay
New York 13	Thomas Cornell	Republican	Absent
Pennsylvania 21	John Covode	Republican	Yea
Illinois 8	Shelby Moore Cullom	Republican	Yea
Massachusetts 10	Henry L. Dawes	Republican	Nay
Rhode Island 2	Nathan F. Dixon II	Republican	Nay
Iowa 5	Grenville M. Dodge	Republican	Nay
Minnesota 2	Ignatius L. Donnelly	Republican	Yea
Michigan 6	John F. Driggs	Republican	Nay
Ohio 17	Ephraim R. Eckley	Republican	Yea
Ohio 1	Benjamin Eggleston	Republican	Nay
New Hampshire 1	Jacob Hart Ela	Republican	Yea
Wisconsin 4	Charles A. Eldredge	Democrat	Nay
Massachusetts 1	Thomas D. Eliot	Republican	Nay
Illinois 2	John F. Farnsworth	Republican	Yea
New York 16	Orange Ferriss	Republican	Nay
Michigan 4	Thomas W. Ferry	Republican	Nay
New York 19	William C. Fields	Republican	Nay
Pennsylvania 20	Darwin Abel Finney	Republican	Absent
New York 4	John Fox	Democrat	Absent
Ohio 19	James A. Garfield	Republican	Nay
Pennsylvania 8	James Lawrence Getz	Democrat	Nay
Pennsylvania 15	Adam John Glossbrenner	Democrat	Nay
Kentucky 3	Jacob Golladay	Democrat	Nay
Missouri 4	Joseph J. Gravely	Republican	Yea
New York 15	John Augustus Griswold	Republican	Nay
Kentucky 5	Asa Grover	Democrat	Nay
New Jersey 2	Charles Haight	Democrat	Nay
New Jersey 5	George A. Halsey	Republican	Nay
Ohio 8	Cornelius S. Hamilton	Republican	Nay
Illinois 4	Abner C. Harding	Republican	Yea
Tennessee 7	Isaac Roberts Hawkins	Republican	Nay
California 2	William Higby	Republican	Yea
New Jersey 4	John Hill	Republican	Nay
Indiana 4	William S. Holman	Democrat	Nay
Massachusetts 4	Samuel Hooper	Republican	Nay
Wisconsin 2	Benjamin F. Hopkins	Republican	Yea
Connecticut 2	Julius Hotchkiss	Democrat	Nay
Iowa 6	Asahel W. Hubbard	Republican	Nay
West Virginia 1	Chester D. Hubbard	Republican	Nay
Connecticut 1	Richard D. Hubbard	Democrat	Nay
New York 17	Calvin T. Hulburd	Republican	Nay
New York 30	James M. Humphrey	Democrat	Nay
Indiana 3	Morton C. Hunter	Republican	Yea
Illinois 5	Ebon C. Ingersoll	Republican	Nay
Rhode Island 1	Thomas Jenckes	Republican	Absent
California 3	James A. Johnson	Democrat	Nay
Kentucky 6	Thomas Laurens Jones	Democrat	Nay
Illinois 1	Norman B. Judd	Republican	Yea
Indiana 5	George Washington Julian	Republican	Yea
Pennsylvania 4	William D. Kelley	Republican	Yea
New York 25	William H. Kelsey	Republican	Yea
Indiana 2	Michael C. Kerr	Democrat	Nay
New York 12	John H. Ketcham	Republican	Nay
West Virginia 2	Bethuel Kitchen	Republican	Absent
Kentucky 4	J. Proctor Knott	Democrat	Nay
Pennsylvania 16	William Henry Koontz	Republican	Nay
New York 20	Addison H. Laflin	Republican	Nay
Pennsylvania 24	George Van Eman Lawrence	Republican	Nay
Ohio 4	William Lawrence	Republican	Yea
Missouri 7	Benjamin F. Loan	Republican	Yea
New York 26	William S. Lincoln	Republican	Nay
Illinois at-large	John A. Logan	Republican	Yea
Iowa 4	William Loughridge	Republican	Yea
Maine 1	John Lynch	Republican	Yea
Oregon at-large	Rufus Mallory	Republican	Absent
Illinois 11	Samuel S. Marshall	Democrat	Nay
New York 18	James M. Marvin	Republican	Nay
Tennessee 2	Horace Maynard	Republican	Yea
New York 23	Dennis McCarthy	Republican	Nay
Missouri 5	Joseph W. McClurg	Republican	Yea
Maryland 1	Hiram McCullough	Democrat	Nay
Pennsylvania 13	Ulysses Mercur	Republican	Yea
Pennsylvania 14	George Funston Miller	Republican	Nay
New Jersey 1	William Moore	Republican	Absent
Pennsylvania 22	James K. Moorhead	Republican	Nay
Ohio 13	George W. Morgan	Democrat	Nay
Pennsylvania 17	Daniel Johnson Morrell	Republican	Absent
New York 5	John Morrissey	Democrat	Absent
Tennessee 4	James Mullins	Republican	Yea
Ohio 5	William Mungen	Democrat	Nay
Pennsylvania 3	Leonard Myers	Republican	Yea
Missouri 2	Carman A. Newcomb	Republican	Yea
Indiana 1	William E. Niblack	Democrat	Nay
Delaware at-large	John A. Nicholson	Democrat	Nay
Tennessee 8	David Alexander Nunn	Republican	Yea
Pennsylvania 2	Charles O'Neill	Republican	Yea
Indiana 8	Godlove Stein Orth	Republican	Yea
Wisconsin 1	Halbert E. Paine	Republican	Yea
Maine 2	Sidney Perham	Republican	Nay
Maine 4	John A. Peters	Republican	Nay
Maryland 3	Charles E. Phelps	Conservative	Nay
Maine 5	Frederick Augustus Pike	Republican	Nay
Missouri 1	William A. Pile	Republican	Yea
Ohio 15	Tobias A. Plants	Republican	Nay
Vermont 2	Luke P. Poland	Republican	Nay
West Virginia 3	Daniel Polsley	Republican	Nay
New York 24	Theodore M. Pomeroy	Republican	Absent
Iowa 2	Hiram Price	Republican	Yea
New York 14	John V. L. Pruyn	Democrat	Nay
Pennsylvania 1	Samuel J. Randall	Democrat	Nay
Illinois 13	Green Berry Raum	Republican	Absent
New York 10	William H. Robertson	Republican	Nay
New York 3	William Erigena Robinson	Democrat	Nay
Illinois 9	Lewis Winans Ross	Democrat	Nay
Wisconsin 5	Philetus Sawyer	Republican	Nay
Ohio 3	Robert C. Schenck	Republican	Yea
Pennsylvania 19	Glenni William Scofield	Republican	Absent
New York 28	Lewis Selye	Independent Republican	Absent
Indiana 11	John P. C. Shanks	Republican	Yea
Ohio 7	Samuel Shellabarger	Republican	Absent
New Jersey 3	Charles Sitgreaves	Democrat	Nay
Vermont 3	Worthington Curtis Smith	Republican	Nay
Ohio 18	Rufus P. Spalding	Republican	Nay
Connecticut 3	Henry H. Starkweather	Republican	Nay
New Hampshire 2	Aaron Fletcher Stevens	Republican	Yea
Pennsylvania 9	Thaddeus Stevens	Republican	Yea
New York 6	Thomas E. Stewart	Conservative Republican	Nay
Tennessee 3	William Brickly Stokes	Republican	Yea
Maryland 5	Frederick Stone	Democrat	Nay
New York 1	Stephen Taber	Democrat	Nay
Nebraska at-large	John Taffe	Republican	Absent
Pennsylvania 5	Caleb Newbold Taylor	Republican	Nay
Maryland 4	Francis Thomas	Republican	Yea
Tennessee 5	John Trimble	Republican	Yea
Michigan 5	Rowland E. Trowbridge	Republican	Yea
Massachusetts 3	Ginery Twichell	Republican	Absent
Michigan 2	Charles Upson	Republican	Nay
New York 31	Henry Van Aernam	Republican	Nay
Pennsylvania 11	Daniel Myers Van Auken	Democrat	Nay
New York 29	Burt Van Horn	Republican	Absent
Missouri 6	Robert T. Van Horn	Republican	Yea
Ohio 12	Philadelph Van Trump	Democrat	Nay
New York 11	Charles Van Wyck	Republican	Nay
New York 27	Hamilton Ward	Republican	Yea
Wisconsin 6	Cadwallader C. Washburn	Republican	Nay
Indiana 7	Henry D. Washburn	Republican	Nay
Massachusetts 9	William B. Washburn	Republican	Nay
Illinois 3	Elihu B. Washburne	Republican	Nay
Ohio 14	Martin Welker	Republican	Nay
Pennsylvania 23	Thomas Williams	Republican	Yea
Indiana 10	William Williams	Republican	Yea
Iowa 1	James F. Wilson	Republican	Nay
Ohio 11	John Thomas Wilson	Republican	Nay
Pennsylvania 18	Stephen Fowler Wilson	Republican	Yea
Minnesota 1	William Windom	Republican	Absent
New York 9	Fernando Wood	Democrat	Absent
Vermont 1	Frederick E. Woodbridge	Republican	Nay
Pennsylvania 12	George Washington Woodward	Democrat	Nay
Notes:^α Schuyler Colfax was serving as Speaker of the House. Per House rules, "the Speaker is not required to vote in ordinary legislative proceedings, except when such vote would be decisive or when the House is engaged in voting by ballot."

== Aftermath ==
Radical furor over the conservative and moderate Republicans' votes against impeachment threatened a schism in the Republican Party. Two days after the failed impeachment vote, Radicals met at Thaddeus Stevens' residence to discuss creating a separate congressional organization for Radicals, separate from the Republican Party.

On December 13, 1867, members of the House availed themselves of freedom of debate in the Committee of the Whole on the state of the Union, and several members discussed the failed impeachment resolution at length.

With Johnson feeling liberated from the threat of impeachment, he began acting even more aggressively. He made moves that, combined with earlier actions, made it so every reconstructed state was being overseen by officers more sympathetic to former rebels than Southern loyalists to the union. On December 28, 1867, he removed John Pope from his position of command over Georgia and Alabama and Edward Ord from his position of command over Arkansas and Mississippi, replacing them respectively with the more conservative George Meade and the immensely conservative Alvan Cullem Gillem. He also substituted Meade's subordinate, Wager Swayne (who Meade had been delegating authority over Alabama to).

On January 22, 1868, the House approved by a vote of 99–31 a resolution to launch a second impeachment inquiry against Andrew Johnson, this time run by the House Select Committee on Reconstruction. At a February 13, 1868 committee meeting, a vote on a motion to table consideration of a resolution proposed by Stevens to impeach Johnson had effectively signaled that five of the committee's members still stood opposed to impeachment, unchanged in their position since the December 1867 vote. After the February 13 vote, it momentarily appeared that the prospect of impeachment was dead.

=== Impeachment of Johnson in 1868 ===
While impeachment appeared to be a dead issue after the February 13, 1868 vote by the Committee on Reconstruction, the prospect of impeachment would receive new life days later. On February 21, 1868, Johnson, in violation of the Tenure of Office Act that had been passed by Congress in March 1867 over Johnson's veto, attempted to remove Edwin Stanton, the secretary of war who the act was largely designed to protect, from office. On February 10, the House voted to move any further responsibility over impeachment away from the Committee on the Judiciary and to the Select Committee on Reconstruction. On February 21, 1868, Thaddeus Stevens submitted a resolution to the House resolving for the evidence taken on impeachment by first impeachment inquiry into Johnson be referred to the Select Committee on Reconstruction (who were conducting the second impeachment inquiry), and that the Committee on Reconstruction "have leave to report at any time". This resolution was approved by the House. On February 22, the Select Committee on Reconstruction submitted to the House an impeachment resolution and a report that recommended Johnson be impeached for high crimes and misdemeanors. On February 24, 1868, the United States House of Representatives voted 126–47 to impeach Johnson for "high crimes and misdemeanors", which were detailed in eleven articles of impeachment passed in separate votes held roughly a week after the impeachment resolution was adopted.

The primary charge presented against Johnson in the articles of impeachment that were adopted was that he had violated the Tenure of Office Act by removing Stanton from office. It was decided by the committee tasked with drafting the articles of impeachment that they would not include any of the charges that had been recommended by Thomas Williams' Judiciary Committee majority report in the first impeachment inquiry against Johnson. The New York Times reported that inclusion of those claims would be seen as fatally harming the, "moral and legal effect of the prosecution" in Johnson's impeachment. The articles of impeachment that were ultimately produced by the committee were narrow in their focus and were legalistic and molded on criminal indictment, likely in direct reaction to the failure of the broad allegations cited in the 1867 effort to persuade the House members.

Johnson was narrowly acquitted in his Senate trial, with the Senate voting 35 to 19 votes in favor of conviction, one vote short of the two-thirds majority needed to convict.

== See also ==
- Timeline of the impeachment of Andrew Johnson
