= James F. Wilson =

American politician (1828-1895)

James Falconer Wilson
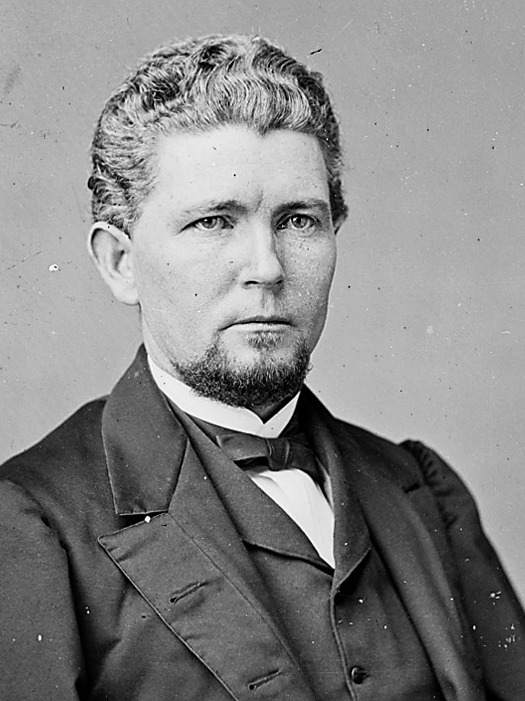

United States Senator from Iowa
- In office March 4, 1883 – March 3, 1895
- Preceded by: James W. McDill
- Succeeded by: John H. Gear

Member of the U.S. House of Representatives from Iowa's 1st district
- In office October 8, 1861 – March 3, 1869
- Preceded by: Samuel Ryan Curtis
- Succeeded by: George W. McCrary

Member of the Iowa House of Representatives
- In office 1857; 1859

Member of the Iowa Senate
- In office 1859–1861
- Preceded by: John Wesley Warner
- Succeeded by: Joshua Monroe Shaffer

Personal details
- Born: October 19, 1828 Newark, Ohio, U.S.
- Died: April 22, 1895 (aged 66) Fairfield, Iowa, U.S.
- Party: Whig; Free Soil; Republican
- Spouse: Mary A. K. Jewett Wilson
- Profession: Politician, attorney

James Falconer "Jefferson Jim" Wilson (October 19, 1828 – April 22, 1895) was an American lawyer and politician. He served as a Republican U.S. Congressman from Iowa's 1st congressional district during the American Civil War, and later as a two-term U.S. Senator from Iowa. He was a pioneer in the advancement of federal protection for civil rights.

While in the United States House of Representatives, he had prominently opposed the 1867 effort to impeach President Andrew Johnson. However, he voted for the subsequent 1868 impeachment of Johnson, and served as a manager (prosecutor) during Johnson's impeachment trial.

In the last half of the nineteenth century, two unrelated Iowans named James Wilson achieved high office, necessitating an early form of disambiguation. Representative and Senator James F. Wilson (of Jefferson County, Iowa) became known as "Jefferson Jim" Wilson, while Representative and Secretary of Agriculture James Wilson (of Tama County, Iowa) became known as "Tama Jim" Wilson.

== Personal background ==
Wilson was born in Newark, Ohio. After his father died when James was eleven, James needed to work from an early age, and attended school when work permitted. After serving as a harnessmaker's apprentice, he studied law in Newark alongside future U.S. Supreme Court Justice William Burnham Woods. He was admitted to the bar in 1851 and practiced in Newark until 1853.

In 1853, he moved to Fairfield, Iowa, where he resumed the practice of law. Three years later in 1856 amidst the 1856 United States presidential election, Wilson ran for and was elected to serve as a delegate to the Convention for the Revision of the Constitution of Iowa. The following year he was elected to the Iowa House of Representatives, where he served in the Ways and Means Committee.

During his early career, Wilson's opposition towards slavery led him to join the Free Soil Party.

Wilson played an important role in the formation of the Iowa Republican Party, and antebellum Iowa government. In 1857, he was a delegate to Iowa's constitutional convention, and served as a Republican in the Iowa House of Representatives that year and in 1859, when he was elected to the Iowa Senate. He served on the Committee of the Judiciary, and later served as a delegate to the 1860 Republican National Convention which nominated Abraham Lincoln of Illinois and Hannibal Hamlin of Maine to head the party ticket for the presidential election.

== U.S. House of Representatives ==
In 1860, Wilson and three others, including incumbent Samuel R. Curtis, vied for the Republican nomination to represent Iowa's 1st congressional district in the U.S. House of Representatives. Curtis won the nomination, then the general election. After the outbreak of the Civil War, however, Curtis resigned to accept appointment as an officer of the Union Army. At the convention called to choose the Republican nominee to succeed Curtis, "it was a foregone conclusion that James F. Wilson would be the unanimous choice." In October 1861 Wilson was elected to fill the vacancy, easily defeating Democrat Jairus Edward Neal.

After completing Curtis's term in the 37th Congress, he was re-elected three times, serving in the 38th, 39th, and 40th Congresses. He was chairman of the House Committee on the Judiciary during the tumultuous periods during the War and Reconstruction.

Rep. Wilson's first action in Congress was introducing a resolution prohibiting fugitive slaves from being returned to the South and ordering the dismissal of any military officer that instructs troops to do such, which was enacted. He in addition reported legislation which enfranchised blacks in Washington, D.C., as well as shepherding a bill that granted freedom to the family of black soldiers.

A business lawyer, Wilson advocated moderating the income tax among lower brackets and "reasonable" levels of protectionism. He also backed railroad grants and the Homestead Act, though opposed the Morrill College Land-Grant Act. Along with other Radical Republicans, Wilson adamantly supported a military occupation of the South during Reconstruction on the grounds that it was the only effective means of ensuring security.

Wilson was aligned with the faction of his Party known at the time as the "Radical Republicans." He supported civil rights moves and objected to President Andrew Johnson's attempts to veto the Civil Rights Act of 1866 and the Reconstruction Acts. His speech refuting arguments that lamented of the 1866 bill's alleged unconstitutionality were remarked by James G. Blaine as having:

...great strength and legal research.

— James Gillespie Blaine

He supported the first bill in Congress to provide voting rights to black citizens of the District of Columbia. He was not a candidate for renomination in 1868, explaining prior to the district convention that with the election of an acceptable Republican president guaranteed and a change in administration inevitable, a change in representation of the First District was also timely. In all, Wilson served in the House from October 8, 1861, to March 4, 1869.

=== 1867 impeachment inquiry against Andrew Johnson ===
Wilson voted in support of launching the 1867 impeachment inquiry against Andrew Johnson. The vote authorizing the impeachment inquiry was largely seen as a means for Republicans to voice their displeasure with Johnson without actually going so far as to impeach him. Many Republicans fully expected that the House Committee on the Judiciary, which would oversee the inquiry, would not recommend impeachment, and that the prospect of impeachment would die quietly in the committee.

At the time of the inquiry, Wilson was the chairman of the House Committee on the Judiciary. During the inquiry, Wilson opposed impeaching Johnson, publicly arguing that there were no proven legal grounds that an impeachment could justifiably be based upon. As a member of the committee, Wilson voted against recommending impeachment. However, on November 25, 1867, the committee voted 5–4 in support of recommending impeachment. Wilson wrote one of the committee's minority reports against impeachment. In his minority report, Wilson argued that, while Johnson, "deserves the censure and condemnation of every well-disposed citizen," the Congress should wait and let Americans remove Johnson from office in the 1868 presidential election. His minority report declared that Johnson, "has disappointed the hopes and expectations of those who placed him in power. He had betrayed their confidence and joined hands with their enemies." However, in arguing against impeachment, it declared, "the day of political impeachments would be a sad one for this country."

When the full House of Representatives subsequently voted on whether to impeach President Johnson, on December 7, 1867, he presented the argument against impeachment after George S. Boutwell made the case in support of impeachment. Wilson argued that while Johnson was the "worst of presidents", his opposition to the positions of the Republican Party was not itself illegal. He argued that, despite Boutwell's assertions that it did, the House did not have lone authority to determine what constitutes an "impeachable offense". Wilson warned the that a broad interpretation of impeachment powers, as Boutwell championed, in theory could allow the House to effectively dictate the policy of presidents. He spent half of his speech arguing that impeachment was only reserved for indictable crimes, and half attacking those who opposed this position. Wilson characterized Boutwell as having effectively argued that the House should be allowed to impeach Johnson for something he could do, rather than some thing he had done. Wilson argued, "this would lead us even beyond the conscience of this house." In his closing remarks, Wilson asked, "if we cannot arraign the president for a specific crime, for what are we to proceed against him?" After Wilson delivered his argument against impeachment were presented, the House voted proceeded to hold a vote in which it strongly voted against impeachment.

=== 1868 impeachment of Andrew Johnson ===
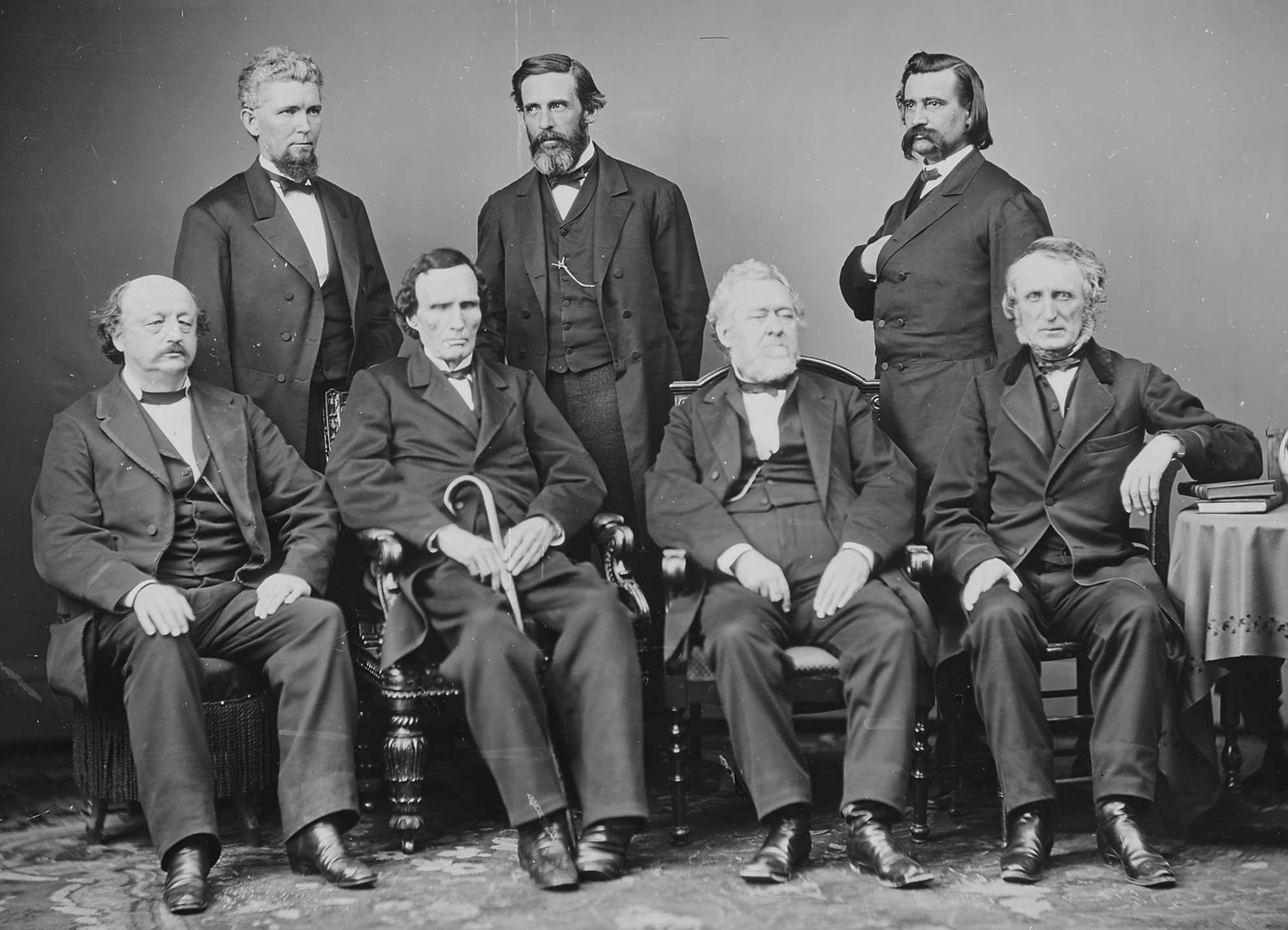
Johnson impeachment managers Seated L-R: Benjamin Butler, Thaddeus Stevens, Thomas Williams, John Bingham; Standing L-R: Wilson, George S. Boutwell, John A. Logan

On January 27, 1868, Wilson voted in support of launching the second impeachment inquiry against Andrew Johnson.

Despite his initial misgivings on impeachment, after Johnson attempted to dismiss and replace of Edwin Stanton in violation of the Tenure of Office Act, Wilson voted to impeach President Johnson on February 24, 1868, when the House successfully voted to impeach him. Before the vote, Wilson expressed an opinion representative of those expressed during debate by many Republicans that had previously voted against the impeachment resolution brought by the Judiciary Committee at the close of the 1867 impeachment inquiry against Johnson, declaring that,

The considerations which weighed upon my mind and molded my conduct in the case with which the Committee on the Judiciary of this House was charged are not to be found in the present case.

Wilson opined that in the previous impeachment vote, Johnson had not committed any action that was a crime under either common law or statute. Wilson declared that Johnson had mistakenly been emboldened after he was not impeached in December 1867 and had proceeded to commit an act that constituted clear impeachable conduct, declaring,

He mistook our judgment for cowardice, and worked on until he has presented to us, as a sequence, a high misdemeanor known to the law and defined by statute.

Wilson was afterwards appointed as a member of the seven-member committee that was tasked with writing articles of impeachment. When the House voted on specific articles of impeachment in early March, Wilson voted for all but one of the eleven articles, being one of twelve members of the Republican Party to vote against the tenth article of impeachment (which had been written by Benjamin Butler independent from the seven-member committee). Wilson was elected one of the seven House managers (prosecutors) for impeachment trial of President Johnson. During the trial, Wilson sparred with Maine senator William P. Fessenden, who claimed that he broke from "his usual discretion."

== Government director of the Pacific Railroad ==
President Ulysses S. Grant offered Wilson the post of Secretary of State, but Wilson declined it, serving instead as government director of the Pacific Railroad for eight years.

== U.S. Senate ==
In 1882, the Iowa General Assembly elected Wilson to the U.S. Senate. His first initiative as a U.S. Senator was to propose an unsuccessful constitutional amendment to more explicitly authorize the federal government to adopt laws that protect civil rights from violations by private citizens, to nullify the Supreme Court's ruling two months earlier in the Civil Rights Cases, 109 U.S. 3 (1883). The General Assembly re-elected him in 1888 to a second six-year term. In the Senate, Wilson served as chairman of the Committee of Mines and Mining (in the Forty-eighth Congress), Committee on Expenditures of Public Money (in the Forty-eighth Congress), Committee on the Judiciary Committee (in the Forty-ninth), Committee on Revision of the Laws of the United States (in the Forty-ninth through Fifty-second Congresses), and the Committee on Education and Labor (in the Fifty-second Congress).

In the Senate, Wilson was known as a staunch supporter of the Prohibition cause, being a member of the Sons of Temperance. He was particularly outspoken on the issue, advocating in 1883 to commit the GOP state convention in Iowa to the issue.

In 1890, Wilson was one of three Senators mentioned as potential nominees to fill the vacancy on the U.S. Supreme Court created by the death of Justice Samuel F. Miller of Iowa. President Benjamin Harrison instead picked Michigan judge Henry Billings Brown, who would later write the Supreme Court's opinion upholding "separate but equal" racial segregation in Plessy v. Ferguson, 163 U.S. 537 (1896).

== Death ==
Wilson died in Fairfield shortly after his second Senate term ended. In its obituary, the New York Times attributed his death to "paralysis of the brain", and stated that his death had been expected. He was interred in Fairfield-Evergreen Cemetery.

== See also ==
- US Senator James F. Wilson House in Fairfield is listed on the National Register of Historic Places

U.S. House of Representatives
| Preceded by Samuel R. Curtis | Member of the U.S. House of Representatives from Iowa's 1st congressional district October 8, 1861 – March 4, 1869 | Succeeded by George W. McCrary |
U.S. Senate
| Preceded by James W. McDill | U.S. senator (Class 2) from Iowa; March 4, 1883 – March 4, 1895; Served alongside: William B. Allison | Succeeded by John H. Gear |
