= United States Senator James F. Wilson House =

Historic house in Iowa, United States

- US Senator James F. Wilson House
- U.S. National Register of Historic Places
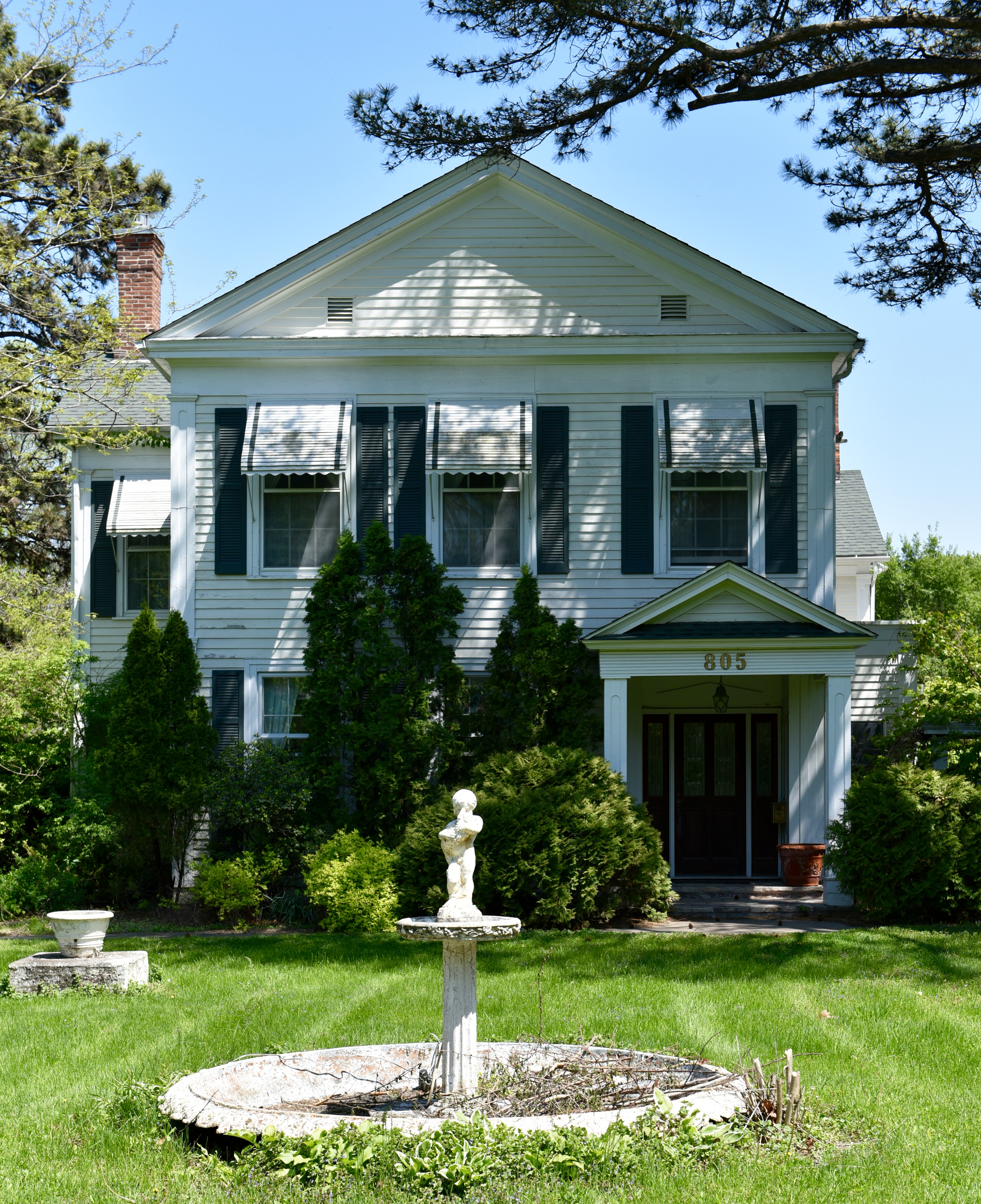

- Location within Iowa Location within the United States
- Location: 805 S. Main St. Fairfield, Iowa
- Coordinates: 40°59′59″N 91°57′45″W
- Area: 1.93 acres (0.78 ha)
- Built: 1854
- Architectural style: Italianate
- MPS: US Senator James F. Wilson Historic Resources MPS
- NRHP reference No.: 90002130
- Added to NRHP: January 24, 1991

US Senator James F. Wilson House, also known as the Hamilton House and the Fulton House, is a historic residence located in Fairfield, Iowa, United States. This house was built for attorney William L. Hamilton in 1854. Its notoriety is derived from the residency of James F. Wilson, who lived here from 1863 to 1895.

== Historical background ==
Wilson was instrumental in establishing the Republican Party in Iowa, and he served in the Iowa Senate, as a U.S. Congressman from Iowa's 1st congressional district during the American Civil War and as a two-term U.S. senator. He lived in this house during his political career and died here in 1895. His wife Mary continued to live here until she died in 1916. Charles Fulton bought the house sometime after that. He was a local historian whose two-volume work, History of Jefferson County. Iowa, was published in 1912. He was also the Secretary-Treasurer of the Louden Machinery Company.

The house was built in three parts. The original part of the two-story, frame house is in the center of the present structure. This I-house was built by Hamilton and contains the dining room and study on the main floor. The second unit is the front of the house, and it was built by either Hamilton or Wilson. The entry hall and living room are located here. The third unit is the back of the house, and it contains and kitchen and other service areas of the house. It may have been built by Wilson. The bedrooms are located on the second floor.

The house sits on 1.93 acres (0.78 ha), but in Wilson's time it sat on a 41-acre (17 ha) estate that his sons farmed with the assistance on a farmhand. It also contained two ponds. One was stocked with ornamental fish, and the second had an island with a frame hut used for reflection.

The house sits 100 feet (30 m) off the street, which is further back than other houses on the street.

It calls attention to the Wilson House predating them, and it gives the house a more suburban feel. It was listed on the National Register of Historic Places in 1991.
