= Joshua Monroe Shaffer =

American politician (1830–1913)

Joshua Monroe Shaffer (September 13, 1830 – March 25, 1913) was an American politician and physician.

Shaffer, a native of Washington County, Pennsylvania, was born on September 13, 1830, the youngest of ten children born to parents John Shaffer and his wife Charlotte Slagle. At the age of thirteen, Joshua Shaffer enrolled at Washington and Jefferson College, graduating in 1848. The following year, he began studying medicine with his brother John E. Shaffer in Elizabeth, Pennsylvania, and attending lectures at the University of Pennsylvania. In 1852, Joshua Shaffer moved to Fairfield, Iowa, where he began practicing medicine. In 1862, the University of Iowa awarded Shaffer an honorary degree in medicine.

Shaffer was active in the 1853 establishment of the Iowa State Agricultural Society, and served as the organization's secretary from 1853 to 1854 and 1863 to 1873. He was additionally interested in taxidermy, natural history, Iowa history, and preservation. While a resident of Fairfield, Shaffer was librarian and secretary of the Jefferson County Library.

Shaffer attended the first Iowa State Republican Convention, which was held in Fairfield. He was elected to the Iowa Senate in 1861, and represented District 10 as a Republican from January 13, 1862, to January 10, 1864. He succeeded James F. Wilson in office, and was replaced by Theron Webb Woolson after redistricting. From 1863 to 1865, Shaffer served as surgeon of the board of enrollment for Iowa's first congressional district, responsible for giving health examinations to newly conscripted and volunteer soldiers of the Union Army during the American Civil War. Shaffer was selected to represent Iowa at the 1867 Paris Exposition, but did not attend, as the state did not fund his expenses. He moved to Keokuk in 1874, where he joined the Iowa Life Insurance Company as secretary until the company ended operations. Shaffer then established a private medical practice in Keokuk. Between 1876 and 1877, Shaffer lectured at the Keokuk College of Physicians and Surgeons.

Shaffer married Melvina Jane Curry on March 18, 1856. The couple raised two sons, Llewellyn James and William Monroe, and a daughter, Susan F. He died in Keokuk on March 25, 1913.
