= Sidney T. Holmes =

American politician (1815–1890)

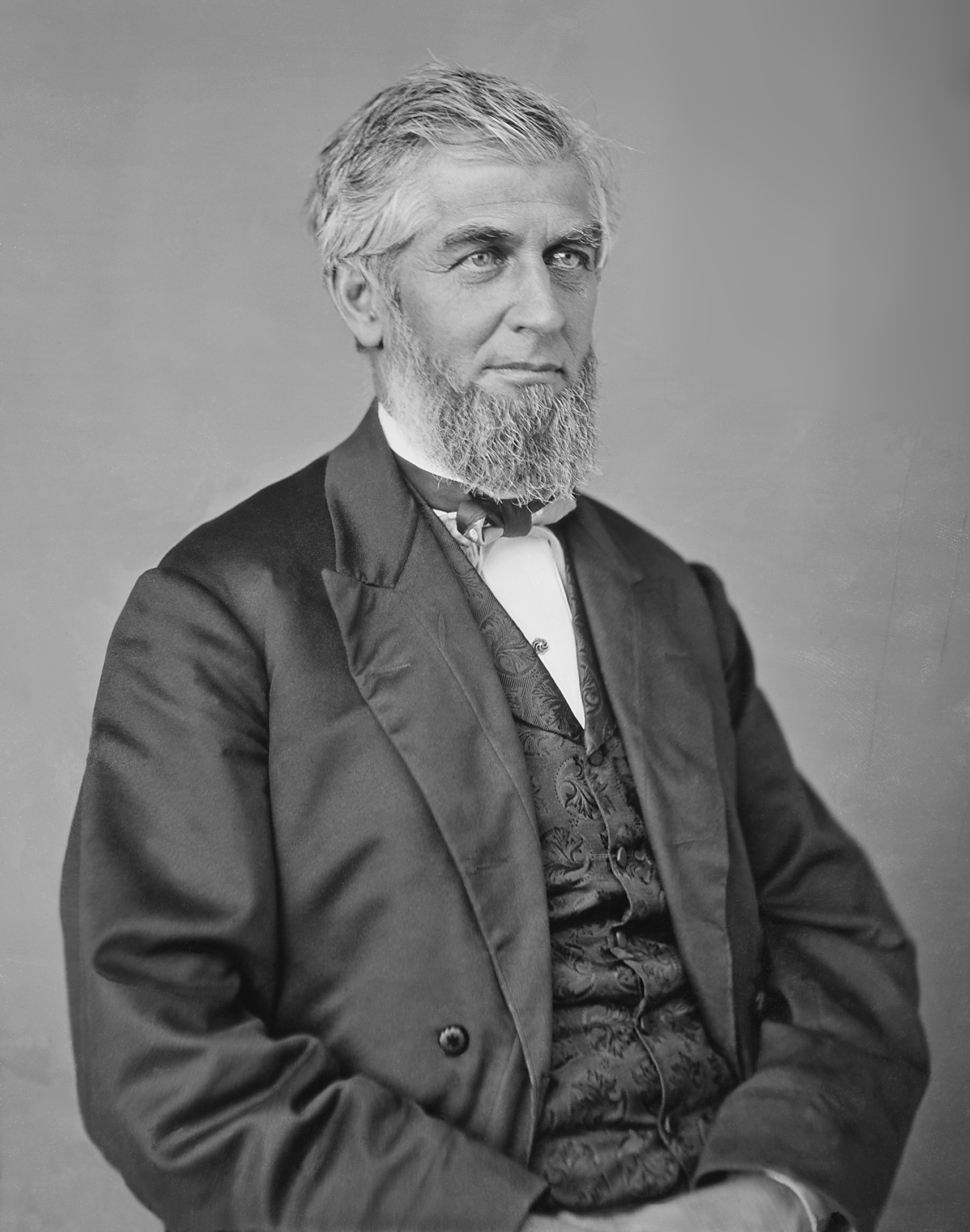

Member of the U.S. House of Representatives from New York's 22nd district
- In office March 4, 1865 – March 3, 1867
- Preceded by: DeWitt Clinton Littlejohn
- Succeeded by: John C. Churchill

Personal details
- Born: Sidney Tracy Holmes; August 14, 1815 Schaghticoke, New York, U.S.
- Died: January 16, 1890 (aged 74) Bay City, Michigan, U.S.
- Resting place: Cedar Street Cemetery, Morrisville, New York, U.S.
- Party: Republican
- Profession: Politician, lawyer

Sidney Tracy Holmes (August 14, 1815 – January 16, 1890) was a U.S. representative from New York.

Born in Schaghticoke, New York, Holmes moved with his parents to Morrisville, New York in 1819. He attended the public schools, graduated from Morrisville Academy and Waterville Seminary, and taught school.

Holmes later worked as a civil engineer, and was employed on the Chenango and Black River Canals and the New York and Erie Railroad.

He later studied law with his father Epenetus Holmes, an attorney and Judge. Sidney T. Holmes attained admission to the bar in 1841 and commenced practice in Morrisville.

He was a Loan commissioner for Madison County from 1848 to 1851, responsible for obtaining approval for and overseeing expenditure of money borrowed for public works improvements.

From 1851 to 1864 Holmes served as Judge of the Madison County Court and county Surrogate Judge.

He was a supporter of the Union in the American Civil War. In addition to aiding in recruiting efforts, in 1862 he served as a Loan Commissioner for funds borrowed to train and equip soldiers from Madison County.

Holmes was elected as a Republican to the Thirty-ninth Congress (March 4, 1865 – March 3, 1867). He was not a candidate for renomination in 1866.

He resumed the practice of law in Morrisville. For three years he practiced in Utica as the partner of Roscoe Conkling.

In 1872 Holmes traveled in the western United States while attempting to restore his failing health, and was impressed with the activity and possibilities of Bay City, Michigan. He moved there permanently, and continued to practice law.

In 1873 Sidney T. Holmes had invested in S.T. Holmes Planing Mill, Sash, Door & Blind Factory, Grand Rapids, Michigan. It would be the first west side water power canal factory to be completely operated by wheelhouse cable power. By 1876 this same factory would be known as Holmes, Parker & Co. a picture frames and moldings factory in partnership with Francis A. Parker.

Holmes died in Bay City on January 16, 1890. He was interred in Cedar Street Cemetery, Morrisville, New York.

== Sources ==
- United States Congress. "Sidney T. Holmes (id: H000742)". Biographical Directory of the United States Congress.

U.S. House of Representatives
Preceded by DeWitt Clinton Littlejohn	Member of the U.S. House of Representatives from New York's 22nd congressional district 1865–1867	Succeeded by John C. Churchill
