= John C. Churchill =

American lawyer and politician

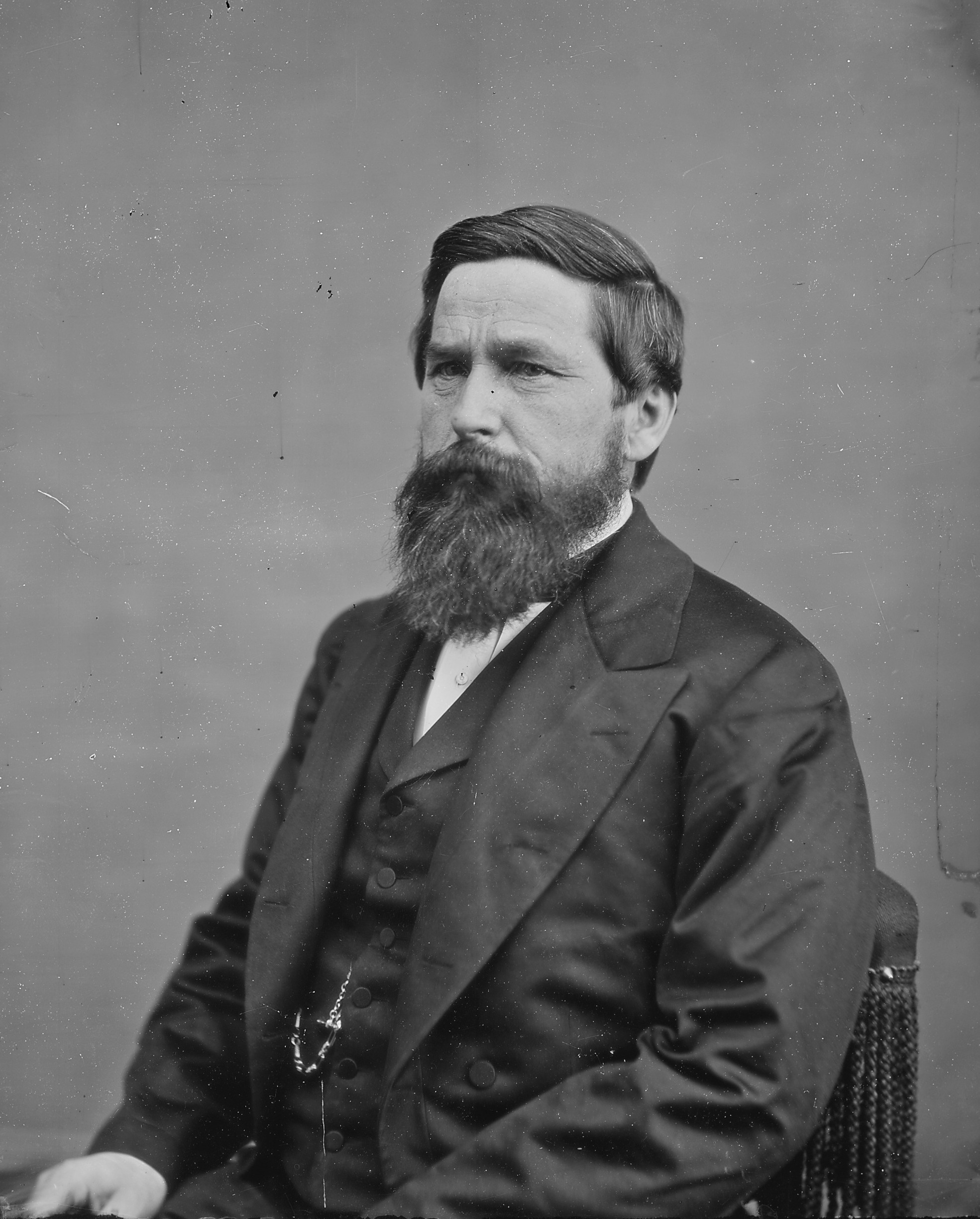

Justice of the New York Supreme Court
- In office 1881–1891

Member of the House of Representatives from New York's 22nd District
- In office March 4, 1867 – March 3, 1871
- Preceded by: Sidney T. Holmes
- Succeeded by: William E. Lansing

Judge of the Oswego County Court
- In office 1861–1864

District attorney of Oswego County, New York
- In office 1857–1860

Supervisor of Oswego County, New York
- In office 1854–1855

Personal details
- Born: January 17, 1821 Mooers, New York
- Died: June 4, 1905 (aged 84) Oswego, New York
- Party: Republican
- Spouse: Catharine Sprague (m. 1849)
- Education: Middlebury College; Dane Law School
- Occupation: Teacher, lawyer

John Charles Churchill (January 17, 1821 – June 4, 1905) was an American lawyer and politician from New York.

== Life ==
John C. Churchill was born in Mooers, New York on January 17, 1821. He attended the Burr Seminary, Manchester, Vermont, and graduated from Middlebury College in 1843. He was a teacher of languages in the Castleton Seminary, and a tutor in Middlebury College. He attended the Dane Law School of Harvard University. He was admitted to the bar in 1847 and commenced practice in Oswego, New York, in 1848.

He married Catharine Sprague on September 11, 1849, and they had four children.

He was a member of the Oswego Board of Education from 1853 to 1856, a Supervisor of Oswego County in 1854 and 1855, District Attorney from 1857 to 1860, and judge of the Oswego County Court from 1861 to 1864. He was appointed by Governor Morgan commissioner to superintend the draft for Oswego County in 1862 and 1863.

Churchill was elected as a Republican to the 40th and 41st United States Congresses, and served from March 4, 1867 to March 3, 1871. He was Chairman of the Committee on Expenditures on Public Buildings (41st Congress).

He introduced bill H.R. 2634 on January 9, 1871 that would amend the Enforcement Act of 1870. The amendment would add an enforcement mechanism to the act. The bill would be enacted as the Second Enforcement Act of 1871 by Congress in February 1871 and signed into law by President Ulysses S. Grant on February 28, 1871.

He was a delegate to the 1876 Republican National Convention. In 1877, he ran for Secretary of State of New York, but was defeated by Democrat Allen C. Beach. He was President of the Oswego Board of Education in 1879 and 1880.

On January 17, 1881, he was appointed a justice of the New York Supreme Court to fill a vacancy. He was subsequently elected to a full fourteen-year term, and remained in office until the end of 1891 when he reached the constitutional age limit of 70 years.

He died in Oswego on June 4, 1905, and was buried at the Riverside Cemetery.

== Bibliography ==
- United States Congress. "John C. Churchill (id: C000392)". Biographical Directory of the United States Congress.

U.S. House of Representatives
Preceded by Sidney T. Holmes	Member of the U.S. House of Representatives from New York's 22nd congressional district 1867–1871	Succeeded by William E. Lansing
