= Thomas Williams (Pennsylvania politician) =

American politician

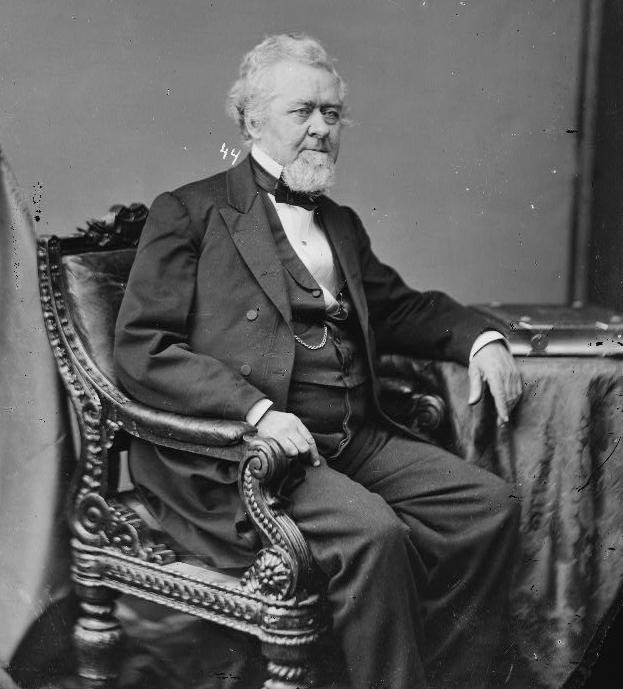
Thomas Williams

Thomas S. Williams (August 28, 1806 – June 16, 1872) was a Republican United States Representative from Pennsylvania.

== Formative years ==
Born in Greensburg, Pennsylvania on August 28, 1806, Williams attended the common schools of his community and graduated from Dickinson College in Carlisle, Pennsylvania in 1825. In 1828, he was admitted to the Pennsylvania bar and began practicing law in Greensburg.

== Career ==
In 1832, Williams moved to Pittsburgh, Pennsylvania, where he continued in private practice and edited the Advocate, a Whig newspaper.

Williams served in the Pennsylvania State Senate from 1838 to 1841, then returned to private practice. During the American Civil War, Williams returned to public office, this time becoming a United States representative, a position he held from March 4, 1863 to March 4, 1869.

He was considered a Radical Republican during the Reconstruction era.

During his last term as a representative, he was involved in matters of impeaching President Andrew Johnson. He wrote the majority report of the House Committee on Judiciary in support of impeachment at the conclusion of the first impeachment inquiry against Andrew Johnson in late 1867. The House ultimately voted to reject the recommendation of impeachment at that time. Months later, after the impeachment of Johnson, Williams served as one of the House impeachment managers (roughly equivalent to a prosecutor) in the impeachment trial.

== Later years, death and interment ==
Williams lived in retirement until his death in Allegheny, Pennsylvania on June 16, 1872; his body was interred in the Allegheny Cemetery in Pittsburgh.

U.S. House of Representatives
Preceded by John W. Wallace	Member of the U.S. House of Representatives from Pennsylvania's 23rd congressional district 1863–1869	Succeeded by Darwin Phelps
