= 1870 Missouri lieutenant gubernatorial election =

- November 8, 1870
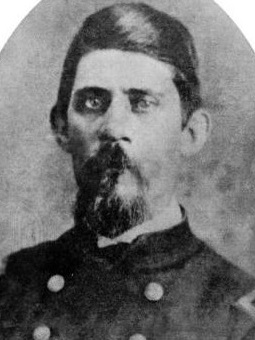
| Nominee | Joseph J. Gravely |
| Party | Liberal Republican |
| Popular vote | Unknown |
| Percentage | 100.00% |
Lieutenant Governor before election
Edwin O. Stanard
Republican
Elected Lieutenant Governor
Joseph J. Gravely
Liberal Republican

The 1870 Missouri lieutenant gubernatorial election was held on November 8, 1870, in order to elect the lieutenant governor of Missouri. Liberal Republican nominee and former member of the U.S. House of Representatives from Missouri's 4th district Joseph J. Gravely won the election as he ran unopposed. The exact results of this election are unknown.

== General election ==
On election day, November 8, 1870, Liberal Republican nominee Joseph J. Gravely won the election as he ran unopposed, thereby gaining Liberal Republican control over the office of lieutenant governor. Gravely was sworn in as the 15th lieutenant governor of Missouri on January 9, 1871.

=== Results ===
Missouri lieutenant gubernatorial election, 1870
| Party | Candidate | Votes | % |
|---|---|---|---|
| Liberal Republican | Joseph J. Gravely | Unknown | 100.00 |
| Total votes | | Unknown | 100.00 |
| Liberal Republican gain from Republican | | | |

== See also ==
- 1870 Missouri gubernatorial election
