= United States v. Eaton =

United States v. Eaton may refer to:

- United States v. Eaton (1898), a U.S. Supreme Court case involving assignment of temporary executive branch personnel
- United States v. Eaton (1892), a criminal case in List of United States Supreme Court cases, volume 144
