= John R. Kelso =

Union Army officer (1831–1891)

John Russell Kelso
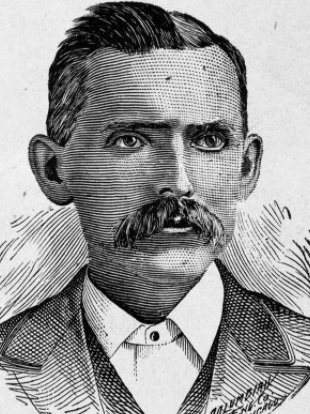
- John R. Kelso, circa 1890

Member of the U.S. House of Representatives from Missouri's 4th district
- In office March 4, 1865 – March 3, 1867
- Preceded by: Sempronius H. Boyd
- Succeeded by: Joseph J. Gravely

Personal details
- Born: March 23, 1831 Franklin County, Ohio, US
- Died: January 26, 1891 (aged 59) Longmont, Colorado, US

John Russell Kelso (March 23, 1831 – January 26, 1891) was a nineteenth-century American politician, author, lecturer and school principal from Missouri.

== Biography ==
He was born in Franklin County, Ohio in a log cabin and had five siblings. He received home education. In 1840 his family moved to Daviess County, Missouri.

In 1851 he married Mary Adelia Moore, a daughter of the Methodist clergy, and they had two children. He became a Methodist preacher himself and also worked as a teacher. After a break-up of his marriage in 1856, he renounced his faith at the annual conference of the Methodist ministers.

Kelso graduated in 1859 from the Pleasant Ridge College, which was affiliated with a Missionary Baptist branch of the Old School, or Hard-Shell Baptist denomination in Weston, Missouri. He started a school in Buffalo, Missouri and married Susie Barnes, one of his students. They had a child of their own in addition to two daughters from the first marriage who stayed with the father.

Kelso continued to work as a school teacher until the Civil War started.

== During the war ==
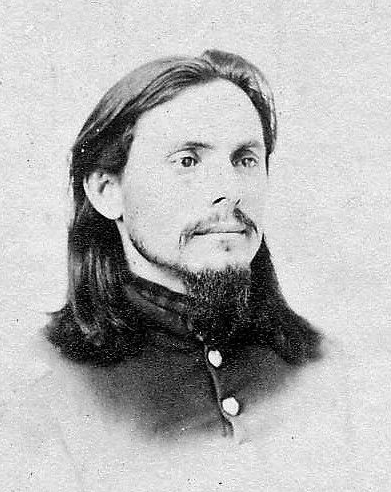
Kelso during the Civil War

Kelso grew up in a pro-slavery family. Though he personally came to resent both slavery and slaveholders in his later life, he kept his views to himself. After the Civil War broke out in April, he publicly declared his pro-Union sympathies and joined the Home Guard regiment of Dallas County, Missouri, where he became a major. Kelso met with Nathaniel Lyon before the Battle of Wilson's Creek. After Lyon's army was defeated at Wilson's Creek, Kelso's Home Guard regiment dispersed. Kelso then joined the Union Army as a private in the 24th Missouri Infantry. His superior officers decided that Kelso could be employed as a spy, and in August 1861 he was sent on a secret mission to Springfield, Missouri. He completed several more through the fall and winter of 1861 on orders from Gen. Samuel Ryan Curtis. In February 1862, he rejoined his regiment to take part in the Curtis' campaign against Confederate forces led by Gen. Sterling Price.

In April 1862 Kelso was elected as a lieutenant of the Company H, 14th Missouri State Militia Cavalry. His service started with a humiliating defeat on May 31, 1862, during the Skirmish at Neosho, where the 14th fled after facing the 6th Regiment of the Missouri Confederate Cavalry and the Second Cherokee Mounted Rifles. In August Kelso's company was victorious in repulsing the Colonel Robert R. Lawther's Confederate raiders, and in September took part in a scouting expedition that routed the bushwhacking Medlock brothers operating from Arkansas. He took part in the Second Battle of Springfield where he fought during the daytime and spied at night. Kelso developed a reputation of a skillful and fearless soldier, who successfully completed solo and group reconnaissance missions.

He continued his service in the Company M of the 8th Missouri State Militia Cavalry and was promoted to captain in spring 1864. He performed scouting missions during the Price's Missouri Expedition in September and October 1864. Kelso's war exploits became widely known in Missouri and he was nominated to Congress by his admirers. He ran as an Independent Republican against Col. Sempronius H. Boyd, his former regimental commander at the 24th Missouri Infantry.

== United States House of Representatives ==
Kelso was elected as an Independent Republican to the United States House of Representatives in 1864, serving from 1865 to 1867, not being a candidate for renomination in 1866.

While in Congress, on June 7, 1867, he introduced a resolution that would have impeached President Andrew Johnson. At the time, many Radical Republicans desired to impeach the president, while much of the Republican Party's congressional caucus was not prepared to do so. While Kelso's resolution was never voted on, the House did approve a sperate resolution that day by James Mitchell Ashley which launched the first impeachment inquiry against Andrew Johnson.

== After the war ==
Afterward, he was principal of Kelso Academy in Springfield, Missouri, from 1867 to 1869, moved to Modesto, California, in 1872 and moved again to Longmont, Colorado, in 1885.

He was an author and lecturer until his death in Longmont on January 26, 1891. Kelso was interred on his estate near Longmont and was later disinterred, cremated and scattered.

== Legacy ==
According to the historian Charles Elmo Ingenthron, Kelso is remembered in Missouri as a ruthless Union advocate:

One of the most unusual Union patriots of the upper White River Valley was Capt. John R. Kelso, a school teacher, who reportedly spoke fluently five languages. He served in the Fourth State Militia as a Lieutenant, and later as Captain in the 8th Missouri Militia. He was a fanatic in his Unionism. He thought all Confederates to be traitors, guilty of treason and deserving death. It is said he killed many a man without cause. It is also said that he always carried a book in his saddle pockets. He read as he waited to drop the rebel.

U.S. House of Representatives
Preceded by Sempronius H. Boyd	Member of the U.S. House of Representatives from Missouri's 4th congressional district March 4, 1865 – March 3, 1867	Succeeded by Joseph J. Gravely
