= Sempronius H. Boyd =

American politician (1828–1894)

Sempronius Hamilton Boyd
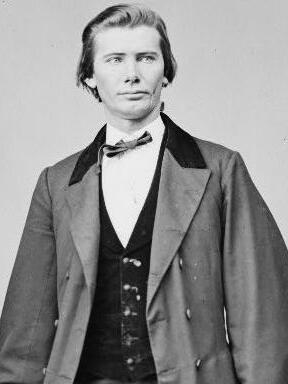

3rd United States Minister to Siam
- In office October 1, 1890 – June 13, 1892
- President: Benjamin Harrison
- Preceded by: Jacob T. Child
- Succeeded by: John Barrett

Member of the U.S. House of Representatives from Missouri's 4th district
- In office March 4, 1869 – March 3, 1871
- Preceded by: Joseph J. Gravely
- Succeeded by: Harrison E. Havens
- In office March 4, 1863 – March 3, 1865
- Preceded by: Elijah Hise Norton
- Succeeded by: John R. Kelso
House positions
Member of Committee on Revolutionary Claims
In office
1869–1871
Member of United States House Committee on Revisal and Unfinished Business
In office
1863–1865

District Judge of Missouri 14th District
- In office 1865

Mayor of Springfield, Missouri
- In office 1858–1860
- Preceded by: J. S. Kimbrough
- Succeeded by: J. W. Mack

Clerk of the Court of Greene County
- In office 1854–1856

Personal details
- Born: May 28, 1828 Williamson County, Tennessee, U.S.
- Died: June 22, 1894 (aged 66) Springfield, Missouri, U.S.
- Party: Immediate Emancipation (1862–63); Radical Union Party (1863–70); Republican (after 1870)
- Occupation: Politician, Lawyer, Judge, Teacher, Diplomat

Sempronius Hamilton Boyd (May 28, 1828 – June 22, 1894) was a nineteenth-century politician, lawyer, judge and teacher from Missouri. He served as a member of the United States House of Representatives from Missouri and as a United States minister to Siam.

== Biography ==
Born in Williamson County, Tennessee, near Nashville, Boyd moved to a farm near Springfield, Missouri, with his parents in 1840, where he was educated by private tutors. He moved to California in 1849 where he prospected for gold and taught school. He moved back to Missouri in 1854, where he was clerk of the court of Greene County, Missouri, from 1854 to 1856. He studied law and was admitted to the bar in 1856, commencing practice in Springfield, Missouri.

Boyd served as mayor of Springfield in 1856 and at the outbreak of the Civil War, raised the 24th Missouri Infantry for the Union Army, serving as its colonel from 1861 to 1863. He was elected a Immediate Emancipationist to the United States House of Representatives in 1862, serving from 1863 to 1865. There, he served as chairman of the Committee on Revisal and Unfinished Business from 1863 to 1865. Boyd was a member of the Republican National Committee from 1864 to 1868, was a delegate to the Republican National Convention in 1864, and was appointed judge of the court of the fourteenth judicial district in 1865. The same year, he presided over the trial of Wild Bill Hickok over the death of Davis Tutt, during which he famously suggested to the jury the possibility of nullification, which they proceeded to do.

Boyd was involved in building and operating the Southwest Pacific Railroad from 1867 to 1874. He was elected back to the House of Representatives as a Republican in 1868, serving again from 1869 to 1871. There, he served as chairman of the Committee on Revolutionary Claims from 1869 to 1871.

Afterward, Boyd operated a wagon factory from 1874 to 1876, resumed practicing law, and was appointed U.S. Minister and Consul General to Siam by President Benjamin Harrison in 1890, serving until 1892, when he became too ill to continue in the position and returned to the United States.

He died in Springfield, Missouri, on June 22, 1894, and was interred in Hazelwood Cemetery in Springfield. Following his death, both Boyd's estate and Boyd's own appointed successor as Consul General to Siam sued to recover the salary of the office for the period between Boyd's departure and the qualification of a presidentially appointed successor. Boyd's estate lost the case, and the Supreme Court of the United States upheld this outcome in the 1898 case of United States v. Eaton.

U.S. House of Representatives
Preceded by Elijah Hise Norton	Member of the U.S. House of Representatives from Missouri's 4th congressional district March 4, 1863 – March 3, 1865	Succeeded by John R. Kelso
Preceded by Joseph J. Gravely	Member of the U.S. House of Representatives from Missouri's 4th congressional district March 4, 1869 – March 3, 1871	Succeeded by Harrison E. Havens
Diplomatic posts
Preceded by Jacob T. Child	United States Minister to Siam; October 1, 1890 – June 13, 1892	Succeeded by John Barrett
