= 24th Missouri Infantry Regiment =

24th Missouri Infantry Regiment "The Lyon Legion"
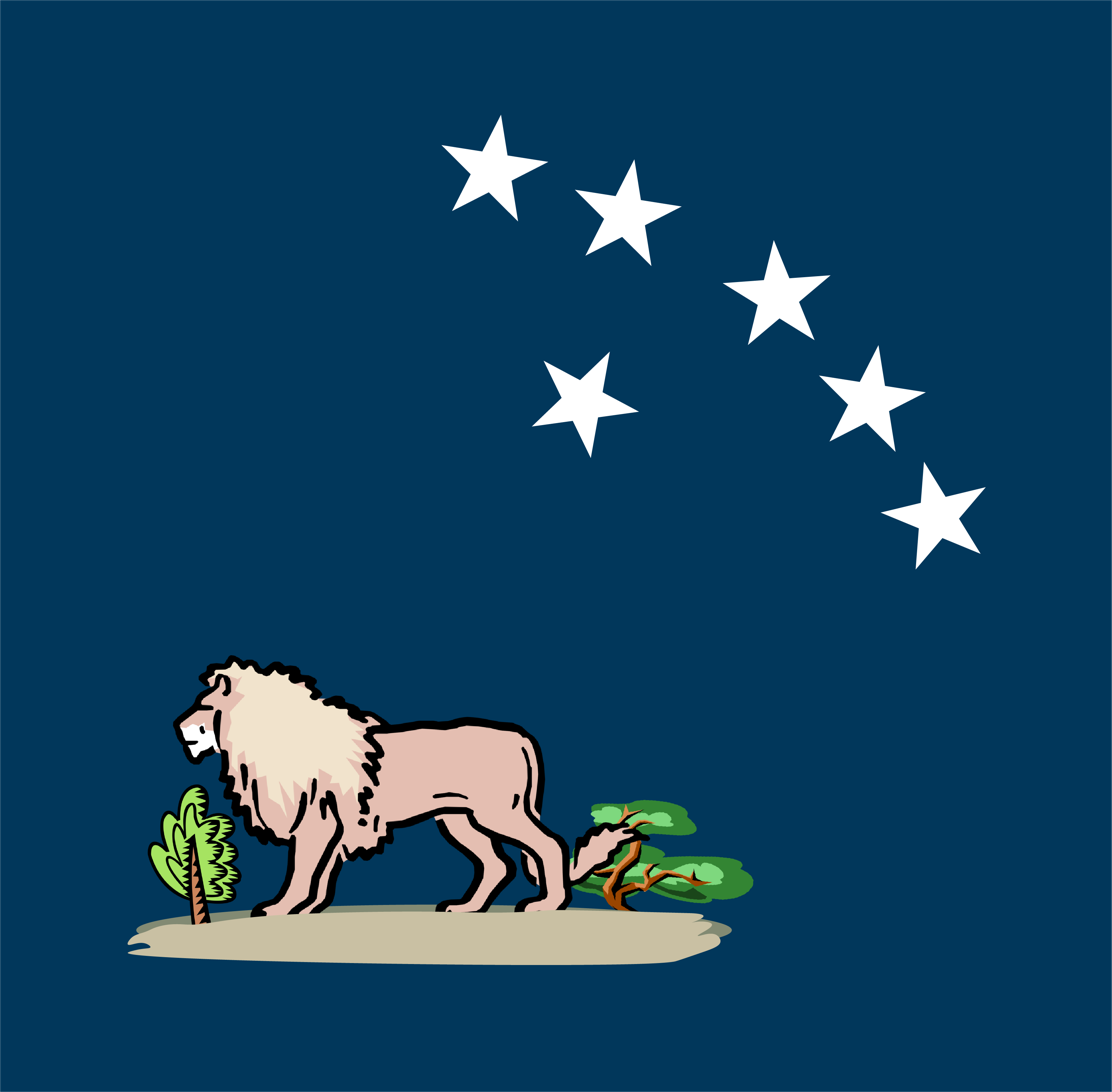
- Regimental color of the regiment
- Active: October 24, 1861, to February 1, 1865
- Country: United States
- Allegiance: Union
- Branch: Infantry
- Engagements: Battle of Pea Ridge (5 companies); Battle of Iuka (Company E); Second Battle of Corinth (Company E); Yazoo Pass Expedition (Company E); Battle of Port Gibson (Company E); Battle of Raymond (Company E); Battle of Jackson (Company E); Battle of Champion Hill (Company E); Siege of Vicksburg (Company E); Chattanooga campaign (Company E); Battle of Missionary Ridge (Company E); Red River Campaign; Battle of Pleasant Hill; Battle of Franklin; Battle of Nashville

The 24th Missouri Infantry Regiment was an infantry regiment that served in the Union Army during the American Civil War.

== Service ==
The 24th Missouri Infantry Regiment was organized from recruits across the state of Missouri, October 24 through December 28, 1861, and mustered in for three years service under the command of Colonel Sempronius Hamilton Boyd.

In addition to its Missouri state regimental number, the regiment bore the name "The Lyon Legion" in honor of Brigadier General Nathaniel Lyon, killed in action on August 10, 1861, leading Federal troops in the Battle of Wilson's Creek.

The regiment was attached to 1st Brigade, Army of Southwest Missouri, to February 1862. Unassigned, Army of Southwest Missouri, to July 1862. District of Eastern Arkansas, Department of the Missouri, to October 1862. 2nd Brigade, 2nd Division, Army of Southeast Missouri, Department of the Missouri, to February 1863. 1st Brigade, 2nd Division, Army of Southeast Missouri, to March 1863. District of Southeast Missouri to June 1863. District of Columbus, Kentucky, 6th Division, XVI Corps, Department of the Tennessee, to January 1864. 2nd Brigade, 3rd Division, XVI Corps, Department of the Tennessee, to March 1864. 2nd Brigade, 3rd Division, XVI Corps, Department of the Gulf, to June, and Department of the Tennessee to October 1864.

Company E served detached from May 1862. Attached to 2nd Brigade, 3rd Division, Army of the Mississippi, May 1862 to November 1862. 2nd Brigade, 7th Division, Left Wing, XIII Corps, Department of the Tennessee, to December 1862. 2nd Brigade, 7th Division, 16th Army Corps, to January 1863, 2nd Brigade, 7th Division, XVII Corps, to September 1863. 2nd Brigade, 2nd Division, XVII Corps, to December 1863. 2nd Brigade, 3rd Division, XV Corps, to October 1864.

Companies F and K were detached and on duty in District of Southeast Missouri to July 1863. Reserve Brigade, 1st Cavalry Division, Army of Southeast Missouri, to August 1863. Unattached, Cavalry Division, Arkansas Expedition, to January 1864. Unattached, 1st Division, VII Corps, Army of Arkansas, to February 1864.

The regiment was mustered out by companies October 1864 through February 1, 1865.

== Detailed service ==
Joined Curtis at Rolla, Mo., January 1862. Curtis' Campaign in Missouri and Arkansas against Price, January to March 1862. Advance on Springfield, Mo., February 2–11. Pursuit of Price into Arkansas February 14–29. Battles of Pea Ridge, Ark., March 6–8. March to Batesville April 5-May 13, then marched to Helena, Ark., May 25-July 14. Duty at Helena until October. Moved to Sulphur Springs, Mo., October 5–11. Pittman's Ferry, Ark., October 27 (3 companies). Moved to Pilot Knob, Mo., October 28–30. March to Patterson November 2–4, to Reeve's Station December 9–10. Return to Patterson December 18. Moved to Van Buren December 21–24, and toward Doniphan January 9–10, 1863. To Alton January 14–18, and to West Plains and Salem, Ark., January 28-February 2. To Pilot Knob and Ironton February 2–27. Moved to St. Genevieve and to Cape Girardeau March 8–12. Operations against Marmaduke April 17-May 2 (Company G). Mill Creek Bridge April 24 (detachment). Duty in southeast Missouri until June. Richfield, Clay County, May 19 (detachment). Ordered to New Madrid, Mo., June, and duty in District of Columbus, Ky., until January 1864. New Madrid, Mo., August 7, 1863 (1 company). Expedition from Union City, Tenn., to Conyersville September 1–10 (detachment). Conyersville September 10, Ordered to Vicksburg, Miss., January 1864. Meridian Campaign February 3-March 5. Meridian February 14–15. Marion February 15–17. Canton February 28. Red River Campaign March 10-May 22. Fort De Russy March 14. Occupation of Alexandria March 16. Henderson's Hill March 21. Battle of Pleasant Hill April 9. Cloutiersville and Cane River Crossing April 22–24. At Alexandria April 27-May 13. Moore's Plantation May 5–7. Bayou Boeuf May 7. Bayou LaMourie May 12. Retreat to Morganza May 13–20. Mansura May 16. Yellow Bayou May 18–19. Moved to Vicksburg, Miss.; then to Memphis, Tenn., May 22-June 10. Lake Chicot, Ark., June 6–7. Smith's Expedition to Tupelo, Miss., July 5–21. Pontotoc July 11. Camargo's Cross Roads, near Harrisburg, July 13. Tupelo July 14–15. Old Town Creek July 15. Smith's Expedition to Oxford, Miss., August 1–30. Tallahatchie River August 7–9. Abbeville and Oxford August 12. Moved to Duvall's Bluff, Ark.. September 1–6. Pursuit of Price through Arkansas and Missouri September 7 to October 6. Mineral Point, Mo., September 27. ordered to St. Louis, Mo., October 6. A detachment of veterans and recruits at Franklin, Mo., until November. Ordered to Paducah, Ky., November 7; then moved to Nashville, Tenn., and Columbia, Tenn., November 22–26. Temporarily attached to 2nd Brigade, 2nd Division, XXIII Corps. Columbia November 26–27. Battle of Franklin November 30. Battles of Nashville, Tenn., December 15–16. Pursuit of Hood to the Tennessee River December 17–28. At Clifton, Tenn., and Eastport, Miss., until February 1865.

Company E participated in the battles of Iuka, Miss., September 19, 1862. Corinth, Miss, October 3–4. Grant's Central Mississippi Campaign November 1862 to January 1863. Expedition to Yazoo Pass and operations against Fort Pemberton and Greenwood March 13-April 5, 1863. At Milliken's Bend, La.. until April 25. Movement on Bruinsburg and turning Grand Gulf April 25–30. Battles of Port Gibson May 1, Raymond May 12, Jackson May 14. Champion Hill May 16. Siege of Vicksburg, Miss., May 18-July 4. Surrender of Vicksburg July 4. Garrison duty at Vicksburg until September. Movement to Helena, Ark.; Memphis, Tenn., and marched to Chattanooga, Tenn., September 12-November 22. Operations on Memphis & Charleston Railroad in Alabama October 20–29. Chattanooga-Ringgold Campaign November 23–27. Tunnel Hill November 23–24. Missionary Ridge November 25. At Bridgeport. Ala. until January 1864. Duty along Memphis & Charleston Railroad until June 1864. Moved to Kingston, Ga., June 15–20, then to Resaca July 2, and duty there until October. Defense of Resaca October 12. Company captured.

Companies F and K participated in actions at Licking, Mo., May 4, 1862. Crow's Station, near Licking, May 26, 1862. Scout in Wayne, Stoddard and Dunklin Counties, Mo., August 20–27, 1862. Duty in District of Southeast Missouri until July 1863. Steele's operations against Little Rock, Ark., July 1-September 10. Capture of Little Rock September 10 and duty there until February 1864. Rejoined the regiment at Vicksburg, Miss., February 1864.

== Casualties ==
The regiment lost a total of 264 men during service; 3 officers and 40 enlisted men killed or mortally wounded, 1 officer and 220 enlisted men died of disease.

== Commanders ==
- Colonel Sempronius Hamilton Boyd - resigned in 1863 to serve in the U.S. House of Representatives from Missouri
- Colonel James K. Mills
- Major Eli E. Weston - commanded at the Battle of Pea Ridge
- Captain William Wallace McCammon - commanded Company E during the Chattanooga Campaign
- Lieutenant Vincent Chalefoux - commanded Company E at the battle of Champion Hill
- Lieutenant Daniel Driscoll - commanded Company E during the siege of Vicksburg

== Notable members ==
- Colonel Sempronius Hamilton Boyd - U.S. Representative from Missouri, 1863-1865; 1869-1871
- Private John Russell Kelso, Company H - U.S. Representative from Missouri, 1865-1867
- Captain William Wallace McCammon, Company E - Medal of Honor recipient for action at the second battle of Corinth, October 3, 1862 (he was a 1st Lieutenant at the time of the action)

== See also ==
- Missouri Civil War Union units
- Missouri in the Civil War
