= Holden v. Hardy =

- Supreme Court of the United States

Argued October 21, 1898 Decided February 28, 1898
- Full case name: Holden v. Hardy, Sheriff
- Citations: 169 U.S. 366 (more) 18 S. Ct. 383; 42 L. Ed. 780; 1898 U.S. LEXIS 1501

Case history
- Prior: Writ of habeas corpus denied; Holden remanded to custody of Sheriff Hardy
- Subsequent: None

Holding
- Laws limiting working hours in mines and smelters are a legitimate and constitutional exercise of the state police power because of the inherent danger of such work.

Court membership
- Chief Justice Melville Fuller Associate Justices John M. Harlan · Horace Gray; David J. Brewer · Henry B. Brown; George Shiras Jr. · Edward D. White; Rufus W. Peckham · Joseph McKenna

Case opinions
- Majority: Brown, joined by Fuller, Harlan, Gray, Shiras, White, McKenna
- Dissent: Brewer, Peckham

Laws applied
- Fourteenth Amendment; Utah state law

Holden v. Hardy, 169 U.S. 366 (1898), is a US labor law case in which the US Supreme Court held a limitation on working time for miners and smelters as constitutional.

== Facts ==
In March 1896, the Utah state legislature passed a law that limited the number of work hours for miners and smelters.

A few months later, Salt Lake County Sheriff Harvey Harden arrested Albert Holden, the owner of Old Jordan Mine, for breaking that law. He charged him with forcing two of his workers to work much longer than eight hours. Holden admitted to making his workers work longer hours, but he argued that the Utah law was unconstitutional because it prevented individuals from making contracts with each other. In addition, Holden argued that the law prevented him from having both property and liberty without due process, and the law also singled out managers in the mining industry by preventing them from equal protection of the laws. Holden was found guilty and fined $50, which he refused to pay, and so he ended up serving a jail sentence of 57 days.

Meanwhile, Holden appealed the case to the Utah Supreme Court and focused on the part of the Utah Constitution that protect the freedoms of labor. Holden argued the Utah Legislature had no right to pass any law restricting how many hours people can work in a day. The Utah Supreme Court disagreed with him, sided with the legislature, and explained that mining and smelting was dangerous: "prolonged effort day after day... will produce morbid, noxious, and often deadly effects in the human system." Therefore, limiting hours of that kind of work was necessary.

Holden then appealed to the U.S. Supreme Court, which agreed to hear oral arguments on October 21, 1897.

== Judgment ==
The Supreme Court, in a majority opinion by Henry Billings Brown, held the Utah law was a legitimate exercise of the police power since there was indeed a rational basis, supported by facts, for the legislature to believe particular work conditions were dangerous. It distinguished the case from laws imposing universal maximum hour rules, which would be unconstitutional under the Due Process Clause of the Fourteenth Amendment:

The legislature has also recognized the fact, which the experience of legislators in many states has corroborated, that the proprietors of these establishments and their operatives do not stand upon an equality, and that their interests are, to a certain extent, conflicting. The former naturally desire to obtain as much labor as possible from their employees, while the latter are often induced by the fear of discharge to conform to regulations which their judgment, fairly exercised, would pronounce to be detrimental to their health or strength. In other words, the proprietors lay down the rules, and the laborers are practically constrained to obey them. In such cases self-interest is often an unsafe guide, and the legislature may properly interpose its authority.

== Reactions ==
In 1916, future Chief Justice William Howard Taft praised Brown's decision for its recognition of social reform.

== See also ==
- US labor law
- Lochner v. New York: Similar case denying limited working hours for bakers
- List of United States Supreme Court cases, volume 169
