= Barrett v. United States (1898) =

- Supreme Court of the United States

Argued January 21, 1898 Decided February 21, 1898
- Full case name: Barrett v. United States
- Citations: 169 U.S. 218 (more) 18 S. Ct. 327; 42 L. Ed. 723

Case history
- Prior: United States v. Barrett et al., 65 F. 62 (C.C.D.S.C. 1894)
- Subsequent: none

Holding
- South Carolina had not been divided into separate federal judicial districts.

Court membership
- Chief Justice Melville Fuller Associate Justices John M. Harlan · Horace Gray; David J. Brewer · Henry B. Brown; George Shiras Jr. · Edward D. White; Rufus W. Peckham · Joseph McKenna

Case opinion
- Majority: Fuller, joined by unanimous

Laws applied
- U.S. Const., Art. III, § 2, cl. 3. and Amend. VI.

Barrett v. United States, 169 U.S. 218 (1898), was a case in which the Supreme Court of the United States held that South Carolina had never effectively been subdivided into separate judicial districts. Therefore, it was held, a criminal defendant allegedly tried in one district for a crime committed in the other had in fact been permissibly been tried in a separate division of a single district.

== Facts of the case ==
The defendant, Charles P. Barrett, was one of a group of men in Spartanburg, South Carolina, alleged to have been involved in a conspiracy to defraud companies selling items by mail order. Barrett, apparently an attorney, arranged to have post offices established in rural areas with the name of each post office being the name of another defendant (e.g. Owens, McElrath, Wyatt). Companies sending mail to those individuals would thereby be led to think that the individuals were proprietors of the respective post offices. Barrett also created a letterhead on which to send orders for goods, in order to further induce the trust of the companies from which orders were placed, and his co-conspirators ordered goods including encyclopedias, a piano, an organ, a desk, and a safe, none of which were ever paid for. The fraud was far reaching, as the trial court reported that parties coming to testify that they had been defrauded:

...came from New York and Chicago, from New Jersey and Pennsylvania, from Boston, Baltimore, and Atlanta, from Washington, Richmond, and Savannah, from Charlotte and Augusta...

Barrett and his co-conspirators were charged with conspiracy to defraud, and the trial was held in the United States circuit court in Columbia, South Carolina, before judge William H. Brawley. Several of Barrett's co-conspirators pleaded guilty, and Barrett was convicted.

== Issue of the case ==
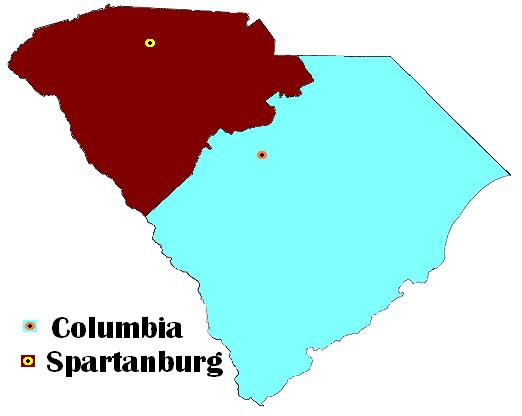
Barrett was tried in Columbia, asserted to be in the Eastern District of South Carolina (in blue), for crimes committed in Spartanburg, asserted to be in the Western District of South Carolina (in red).

Barrett appealed, asserting that the trial was unconstitutional. The Vicinage Clause of the Sixth Amendment states that "in all criminal prosecutions, the accused shall enjoy the right to a speedy and public trial, by an impartial jury of the State and district wherein the crime shall have been committed, which district shall have been previously ascertained by law".

The United States District Court for the District of South Carolina was one of the original 13 courts established by the Judiciary Act of 1789, 1 Stat. 73, on September 24, 1789. Congress had, in various pieces of legislation, subdivided South Carolina into Eastern and Western jurisdictions, and set forth the times when the circuit court of each jurisdiction would sit. The most recent rewording of these, adopted June 22, 1874, included a provision that:

The State of South Carolina is divided into two districts, which shall be called the eastern and western districts of the district of South Carolina. The western district includes the counties of Lancaster, Chester, York, Union, Spartanburg, Greenville, Pendleton, Abbeville, Edgefield, Newberry, Laurens and Fairfield, as they existed February 21, 1823. The eastern district includes the residue of said State.

The same act, however, provided that there would be a single district court judge, a single clerk of the court, a single United States Attorney, and a single United States Marshal appointed for the entire state of South Carolina. Barrett's claim was that the state constituted two districts and that because the crime was alleged to have been committed in Spartanburg, in the western district, his trial in Columbia had not been held before a jury of the "district wherein the crime shall have been committed".

== Opinion of the Court ==
The Supreme Court, in a unanimous opinion written by Chief Justice Melville Fuller, held that Congress had never intended to divide South Carolina into separate judicial districts. The language adopted in 1874 had not been enacted by Congress but was merely a rewording of a previous statute which had been enacted in 1823. The 1823 statute was referenced in the margin of the 1874 act, and had stated: "The district of South Carolina is divided into two divisions, which will be called the eastern and western divisions of the district of South Carolina". The Supreme Court found that "Congress... seems to have construed the act of 1823, not as dividing the State into two judicial districts, as indicated in the title of the act, but into two districts in the sense of geographical divisions, which is in harmony with the language used in the body of the act".

Finding that the state of South Carolina constituted a single judicial district, the Court found it unnecessary to further examine the jurisdiction of the circuit court. Rather, it determined that Barrett was tried and convicted in the district in which the crime had been committed and that the jury had likewise been empaneled from that district.

== Later developments ==
The case itself, standing for a particularly narrow proposition, was only cited in a handful of later decisions by other courts, and only once by the United States Supreme Court for the proposition decided in the case. That decision, Matheson v. United States, similarly held that no constitutional error occurred when a criminal defendant accused of a crime in one part of Alaska was prosecuted in another, the territorial court having been arranged in divisions.

Congress made a more explicit effort to subdivide the District of South Carolina on March 3, 1911, by 36 Stat. 1087, 1123. South Carolina was again subdivided into Eastern and the Western Districts, with one judgeship authorized to serve both districts, effective January 1, 1912. Congress finally authorized an additional judgeship for the Western District, and assigned the sitting judge exclusively to the Eastern District, on March 3, 1915, by 38 Stat. 961. However, on October 7, 1965, by 79 Stat. 951, South Carolina was reorganized as a single judicial district with four judgeships authorized for the district court. It has since remained a single district.
