= List of United States Supreme Court cases, volume 169 =

Supreme Court of the United States
- Interactive map of Supreme Court of the United States
- 38°53′26″N 77°00′16″W
- Established: March 4, 1789; 236 years ago
- Location: Washington, D.C.
- Coordinates: 38°53′26″N 77°00′16″W
- Composition method: Presidential nomination with Senate confirmation
- Authorised by: Constitution of the United States, Art. III, § 1
- Judge term length: life tenure, subject to impeachment and removal
- Number of positions: 9 (by statute)
- Website: supremecourt.gov

This is a list of cases reported in volume 169 of United States Reports, decided by the Supreme Court of the United States in 1898.

== Justices of the Supreme Court at the time of volume 169 U.S. ==
The Supreme Court is established by Article III, Section 1 of the Constitution of the United States, which says: "The judicial Power of the United States, shall be vested in one supreme Court . . .". The size of the Court is not specified; the Constitution leaves it to Congress to set the number of justices. Under the Judiciary Act of 1789 Congress originally fixed the number of justices at six (one chief justice and five associate justices). Since 1789 Congress has varied the size of the Court from six to seven, nine, ten, and back to nine justices (always including one chief justice).

When the cases in volume 169 were decided the Court comprised the following nine members:

Portrait	Justice	Office	Home State	Succeeded	Date confirmed by the Senate (Vote)	Tenure on Supreme Court
	Melville Fuller	Chief Justice	Illinois	Morrison Waite	July 20, 1888 (41–20)	October 8, 1888 – July 4, 1910 (Died)
	John Marshall Harlan	Associate Justice	Kentucky	David Davis	November 29, 1877 (Acclamation)	December 10, 1877 – October 14, 1911 (Died)
	Horace Gray	Associate Justice	Massachusetts	Nathan Clifford	December 20, 1881 (51–5)	January 9, 1882 – September 15, 1902 (Died)
	David Josiah Brewer	Associate Justice	Kansas	Stanley Matthews	December 18, 1889 (53–11)	January 6, 1890 – March 28, 1910 (Died)
	Henry Billings Brown	Associate Justice	Michigan	Samuel Freeman Miller	December 29, 1890 (Acclamation)	January 5, 1891 – May 28, 1906 (Retired)
	George Shiras Jr.	Associate Justice	Pennsylvania	Joseph P. Bradley	July 26, 1892 (Acclamation)	October 10, 1892 – February 23, 1903 (Retired)
	Edward Douglass White	Associate Justice	Louisiana	Samuel Blatchford	February 19, 1894 (Acclamation)	March 12, 1894 – December 18, 1910 (Continued as chief justice)
	Rufus W. Peckham	Associate Justice	New York	Howell Edmunds Jackson	December 9, 1895 (Acclamation)	January 6, 1896 – October 24, 1909 (Died)
	Joseph McKenna	Associate Justice	California	Stephen Johnson Field	January 21, 1898 (Acclamation)	January 26, 1898 – January 5, 1925 (Retired)

== Notable Cases in 169 U.S. ==
=== Holden v. Hardy ===
In Holden v. Hardy, 169 U.S. 366 (1898), the Supreme Court held that a limitation on working time for miners and smelters was constitutional. The decision stated that the Utah law was a legitimate exercise of the state's police power; that such a law is legitimate if there is indeed a rational basis, supported by facts, for the legislature to believe particular work conditions are dangerous.

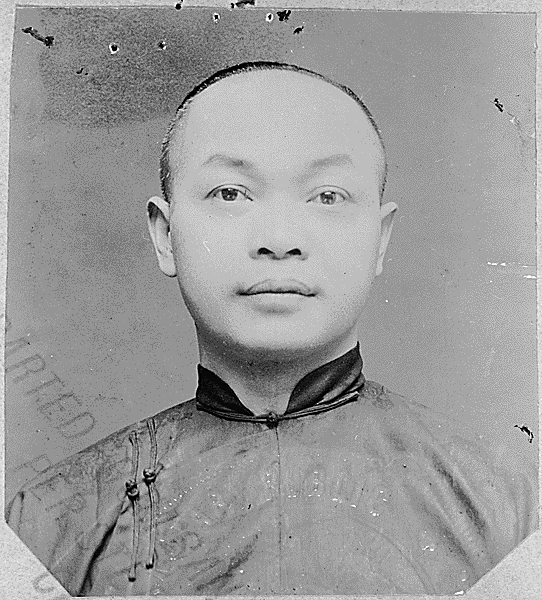
Wong Kim Ark, at about age 33, in a photograph taken from a 1904 U.S. immigration document

=== United States v. Wong Kim Ark ===
United States v. Wong Kim Ark, 169 U.S. 649 (1898), is a landmark decision in which the Supreme Court held that "a child born in the United States, of parents of Chinese descent, who, at the time of his birth, are subjects of the Emperor of China, but have a permanent domicil and residence in the United States, and are there carrying on business, and are not employed in any diplomatic or official capacity under the Emperor of China", is a U.S. citizen. This is due to the first clause of the Fourteenth Amendment of the Constitution, 'All persons born or naturalized in the United States, and subject to the jurisdiction thereof, are citizens of the United States and of the State wherein they reside.'" This decision established an important precedent in the interpretation of the Citizenship Clause of the Fourteenth Amendment to the Constitution.

== Citation style ==
Under the Judiciary Act of 1789 the federal court structure at the time comprised District Courts, which had general trial jurisdiction; Circuit Courts, which had mixed trial and appellate (from the US District Courts) jurisdiction; and the United States Supreme Court, which had appellate jurisdiction over the federal District and Circuit courts—and for certain issues over state courts. The Supreme Court also had limited original jurisdiction (i.e., in which cases could be filed directly with the Supreme Court without first having been heard by a lower federal or state court). There were one or more federal District Courts and/or Circuit Courts in each state, territory, or other geographical region.

The Judiciary Act of 1891 created the United States Courts of Appeals and reassigned the jurisdiction of most routine appeals from the district and circuit courts to these appellate courts. The Act created nine new courts that were originally known as the "United States Circuit Courts of Appeals." The new courts had jurisdiction over most appeals of lower court decisions. The Supreme Court could review either legal issues that a court of appeals certified or decisions of court of appeals by writ of certiorari.

Bluebook citation style is used for case names, citations, and jurisdictions.

- "# Cir." = United States Court of Appeals
  - e.g., "3d Cir." = United States Court of Appeals for the Third Circuit
- "C.C.D." = United States Circuit Court for the District of . . .
  - e.g.,"C.C.D.N.J." = United States Circuit Court for the District of New Jersey
- "D." = United States District Court for the District of . . .
  - e.g.,"D. Mass." = United States District Court for the District of Massachusetts
- "E." = Eastern; "M." = Middle; "N." = Northern; "S." = Southern; "W." = Western
  - e.g.,"C.C.S.D.N.Y." = United States Circuit Court for the Southern District of New York
  - e.g.,"M.D. Ala." = United States District Court for the Middle District of Alabama
- "Ct. Cl." = United States Court of Claims
- The abbreviation of a state's name alone indicates the highest appellate court in that state's judiciary at the time.
  - e.g.,"Pa." = Supreme Court of Pennsylvania
  - e.g.,"Me." = Supreme Judicial Court of Maine

== List of cases in volume 169 U.S. ==
Case Name	Page & year	Opinion of the Court	Concurring opinion(s)	Dissenting opinion(s)	Lower Court	Disposition
Stuart v. Hayden	1 (1898)	Harlan	none	none	8th Cir.	affirmed
United States v. Passavant	16 (1898)	Fuller	none	Brown	2d Cir.	certification
Hetzel v. Baltimore & O.R.R. Co.	26 (1898)	Harlan	none	none	D.C. Cir.	reversed
In re Boardman ex rel. Durrant	39 (1898)	Fuller	none	none	9th Cir.	habeas corpus denied
Building & Loan Ass'n v. Price	45 (1898)	Peckham	none	none	C.C.N.D. Tex.	reversed
Williams v. Paine	55 (1898)	Peckham	none	none	D.C. Cir.	affirmed
Holder v. Aultman M. & Co.	81 (1898)	Gray	none	none	C.C.E.D. Mich.	affirmed
Powers v. Chesapeake & O. Ry. Co.	92 (1898)	Gray	none	none	C.C.D. Ky.	affirmed
Union M.L. Ins. Co. v. Kirchoff	103 (1898)	Fuller	none	none	Ill.	dismissed
Wetmore v. Rymer	115 (1898)	Shiras	none	none	C.C.E.D. Tenn.	reversed
Richardson v. Louisville & N.R.R. Co.	128 (1898)	Fuller	none	none	Fla.	affirmed
Chicago et al. Ry. Co. v. Solan	133 (1898)	Gray	none	none	Iowa	affirmed
Ritter v. Mutual L. Ins. Co.	139 (1898)	Harlan	none	none	3d Cir.	affirmed
Benjamin v. City of New Orleans	161 (1898)	Fuller	none	none	5th Cir.	dismissed
Cessna v. United States	165 (1898)	Brewer	none	none	Ct. Priv. Land Cl.	affirmed
Baker v. Cummings	189 (1898)	White	none	none	D.C. Cir.	reversed
United States v. Klumpp	209 (1898)	Fuller	none	none	2d Cir.	reversed
Barrett v. United States I	218 (1898)	Fuller	none	none	C.C.D.S.C.	affirmed
Barrett v. United States II	231 (1898)	Fuller	none	none	W.D.S.C.	affirmed
Levis v. Kengla	234 (1898)	Gray	none	none	D.C. Cir.	affirmed
Wetzel v. Minnesota et al. Co.	237 (1898)	Brown	none	none	8th Cir.	affirmed
Dull v. Blackman	243 (1898)	Brewer	none	none	Iowa	affirmed
United States v. City of Louisville	249 (1898)	Peckham	none	none	Ct. Cl.	affirmed
Logan County v. United States	255 (1898)	Peckham	none	none	Ct. Cl.	affirmed
Thomas v. Gay	264 (1898)	Shiras	none	none	Sup. Ct. Terr. Okla.	reversed
Baker v. Grice	284 (1898)	Peckham	none	none	C.C.N.D. Tex.	reversed
Willis v. Eastern T. & B. Co.	295 (1898)	Gray	none	none	D.C. Cir.	reversed
Richmond & A.R.R. Co. v. R.A. Patterson T. Co.	311 (1898)	White	none	none	Va.	affirmed
United States v. Garlinger	316 (1898)	Shiras	none	none	Ct. Cl.	reversed
Payne v. Robertson	323 (1898)	White	none	none	Sup. Ct. Terr. Okla.	affirmed
United States v. Eaton	331 (1898)	White	none	none	Ct. Cl.	affirmed
Beley v. Naphtaly	353 (1898)	Peckham	none	none	9th Cir.	affirmed
Smith v. Naphtaly	365 (1898)	Peckham	none	none	9th Cir.	affirmed
Holden v. Hardy	366 (1898)	Brown	none	none	Utah	affirmed
Smithsonian Inst. v. Meech	398 (1898)	Brewer	none	none	D.C. Cir.	reversed
Brown v. Marion Nat'l Bank	416 (1898)	Harlan	none	none	Ky.	reversed
Savings & L. Soc'y v. Multnomah Cnty.	421 (1898)	Gray	none	none	C.C.D. Or.	affirmed
Central Nat'l Bank v. Stevens	432 (1898)	Shiras	none	none	N.Y.	reversed
Smyth v. Ames	466 (1898)	Harlan	none	none	C.C.D. Neb.	affirmed
Merritt v. Bowdoin Coll.	551 (1898)	Harlan	none	none	C.C.N.D. Cal.	dismissed
Backus v. Fort St. U.D. Co.	557 (1898)	Brewer	none	Harlan	Mich.	affirmed
Wilson v. North Carolina	586 (1898)	Peckham	none	none	N.C.	dismissed
United States ex rel. Bernardin v. Butterworth	600 (1898)	Shiras	none	none	D.C. Cir.	reversed
McCormick H.M. Co. v. Aultman Co.	606 (1898)	Brown	none	none	6th Cir.	certification
Missouri et al. Ry. Co. v. Haber	613 (1898)	Harlan	none	Brewer	Kan.	affirmed
Louisville & N.R.R. Co. v. Behlmer	644 (1898)	Fuller	none	none	4th Cir.	vacation denied
United States v. Wong Kim Ark	649 (1898)	Gray	none	Fuller	C.C.N.D. Cal.	affirmed

== See also ==
- Certificate of division
