= Battle of Pea Ridge =

1862 battle of the American Civil War

- Part of the American Civil War
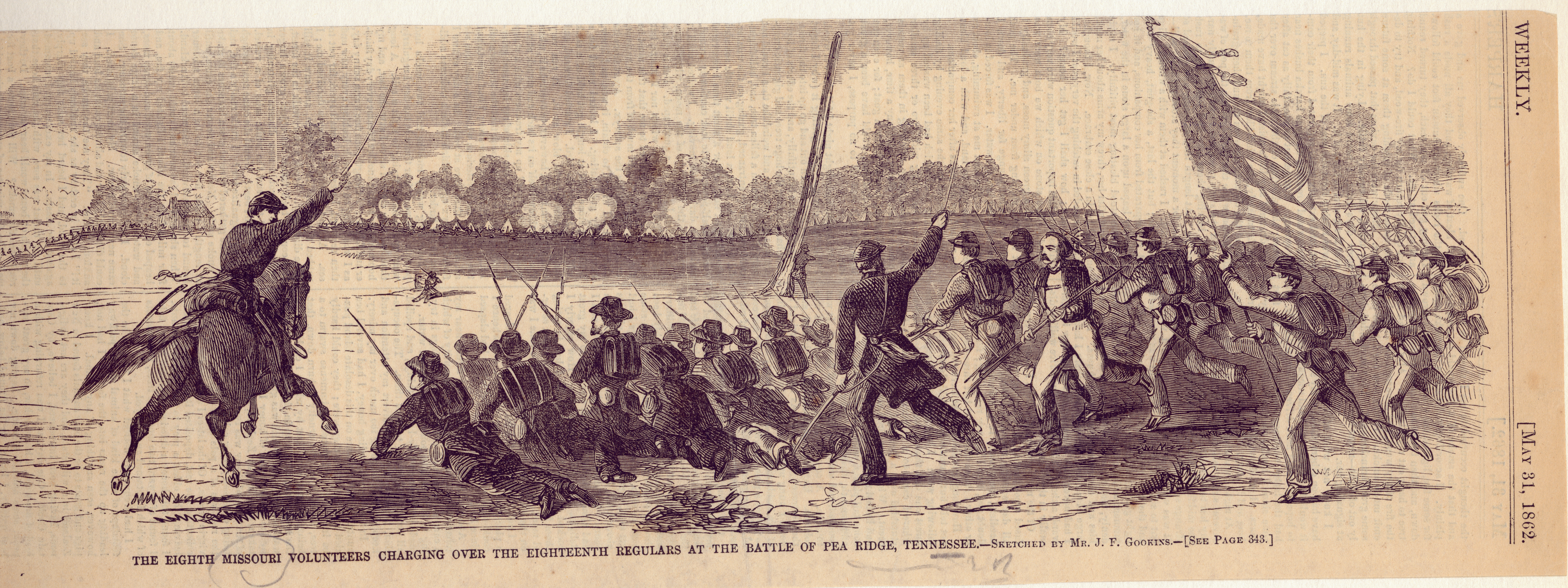
- Harper's Weekly sketch of the battle by J.F. Gookins
Date	March 7–8, 1862
Location	Near Leetown, northeast of Fayetteville, Arkansas 36°27′16″N 94°02′05″W
Result	Union victory

Belligerents
United States (Union); Oneida Indian Nation	Confederate States; Cherokee Nation; Missouri (Confederate)

Commanders and leaders
(United States) Samuel R. Curtis: Franz Sigel	(Confederate States of America) Earl Van Dorn: Benjamin McCulloch †; Albert Pike; Sterling Price (WIA)

Units involved
Army of the Southwest	Army of the West

Strength
10,500	16,500

Casualties and losses
203 killed 980 wounded 201 missing	~2,000 casualties
- Location within Arkansas

The Battle of Pea Ridge (March 7–8, 1862), also known as the Battle of Elkhorn Tavern, took place during the American Civil War near Leetown, northeast of Fayetteville, Arkansas. Federal forces, led by Brigadier General Samuel R. Curtis, moved south from central Missouri, driving Confederate forces into northwestern Arkansas. Major General Earl Van Dorn had launched a Confederate counteroffensive, hoping to recapture northern Arkansas and Missouri. Confederate forces met at Bentonville and became the most substantial Rebel force, by way of guns and men, to assemble in the Trans-Mississippi. Against the odds, Curtis held off the Confederate attack on the first day and drove Van Dorn's force off the battlefield on the second. By defeating the Confederates, the Union forces established Federal control of most of Missouri and northern Arkansas.

== Background ==
Union forces in Missouri during the latter part of 1861 and early 1862 had pushed the Confederate Missouri State Guard under Maj.-Gen. Sterling Price out of the state. By spring 1862, Federal Brig. Gen. Samuel R. Curtis determined to pursue the Confederates into Arkansas with his Army of the Southwest.

Curtis moved his approximately 10,250 soldiers and 50 artillery pieces into Benton County, Arkansas, and along Little Sugar Creek. The Federal forces consisted primarily of soldiers from Iowa, Indiana, Illinois, Missouri, and Ohio. Over half of the Union soldiers were German immigrants, grouped into the 1st and 2nd Divisions, which were under the command of Brig. Gen. Franz Sigel, a German immigrant who had expected to command the army forces into Arkansas. Upon learning that General Curtis was appointed in command, Sigel threatened to resign. The predominantly native-born regiments were assigned to the 3rd and 4th Divisions in order to create an ethnic balance among divisions and their commanders.

Price and his troops pulled back into Arkansas along Wire Road at a rapid pace with Curtis not far behind. There were skirmishes between Federal and Confederate troops at Potts Hill and Little Sugar Creek as Confederate reinforcements reached Price to combine forces against Curtis. The combined Rebel force kept continuing farther into Arkansas thinning Curtis's supply line. Due to the length of Curtis's supply lines and a lack of the reinforcements needed for a further advance, Curtis decided to remain in position. He fortified an excellent defensive line on the north side of the creek, placing artillery for an expected Confederate assault from the south. While Curtis kept position along Little Sugar Creek, Confederate generals Sterling Price and Benjamin McCulloch went into Fayetteville evacuating the city and setting up camp in the Boston Mountains.

Confederate Maj.-Gen. Earl Van Dorn had been appointed as the overall commander of the Trans-Mississippi District to quell a simmering conflict between Price of Missouri and McCulloch of Texas. Van Dorn's Army of the West totaled approximately 16,000 men, which included 800 Indian troops, Price's Missouri State Guard contingents and other Missouri units, and McCulloch's contingent of cavalry, infantry, and artillery from Texas, Arkansas, Louisiana, and Missouri.

Van Dorn was aware of the federal movements into Arkansas and was intent on destroying Curtis's Army of the Southwest and reopening the gateway into Missouri. He intended to flank Curtis and attack his rear, forcing Curtis to retreat north or be encircled and destroyed. Van Dorn had ordered his army to travel light so each soldier carried only three days' rations, forty rounds of ammunition, and a blanket. Each division was allowed an ammunition train and an additional day of rations. All other supplies, including tents and cooking utensils, were to be left behind.

== Prelude ==
Key commanders (Army of the Southwest)
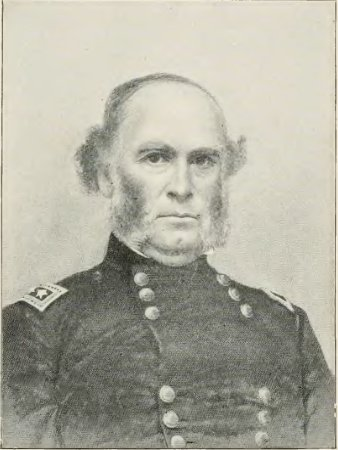
Brig. Gen.
Samuel R. Curtis, Commanding

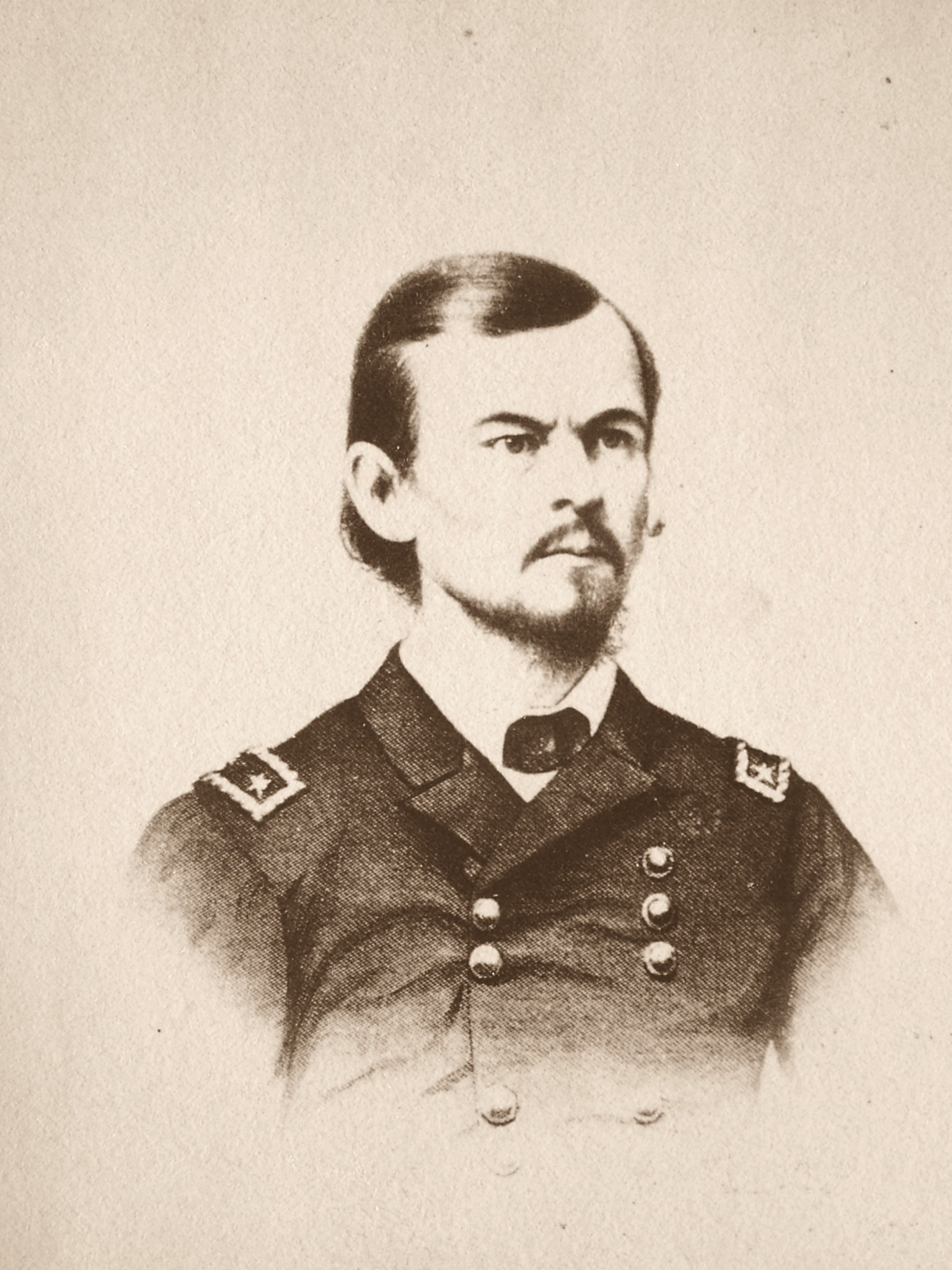
Brig. Gen.
Franz Sigel,
1st and 2d Divisions

On March 4, 1862, instead of attacking Curtis's position head on, Van Dorn split his army into two divisions under Price and McCulloch, ordering a march north along the Bentonville Detour to get behind Curtis and cut his lines of communication. For speed, Van Dorn left his supply trains behind, which proved a crucial decision. Amid a freezing storm, the Confederates made a three-day forced march from Fayetteville through Elm Springs and Osage Spring to Bentonville, arriving stretched out along the road, hungry and tired.

=== Action at Bentonville ===
Warned by scouts and Arkansas unionists, Curtis rapidly concentrated his outlying units behind Little Sugar Creek, placing William Vandever's 700-man brigade, who marched 42 miles (68 km) in 16 hours from Huntsville to Little Sugar Creek. But Curtis's right flank also suffered from Sigel's having sent a 360-man task force to the west, where they would miss the next three days of fighting. Sigel also withdrew a cavalry patrol from the road on which the Confederate army was advancing; however, Colonel Frederick Schaefer of the 2nd Missouri Infantry, on his own initiative, extended his patrols to cover the gap. When Van Dorn's advance guard blundered into one of these patrols near Elm Springs, the Federals were alerted. Still, Sigel was so slow in evacuating Bentonville that his rear guard was nearly snared by Van Dorn on March 6 as he advanced.

Waiting until the Confederate advance was nearly upon him, Sigel ordered his 600 men and six guns to fall back on a road leading northeast toward Curtis's position. The Confederate 1st Missouri Cavalry led by Elijah Gates attacked from the south to cut off Sigel's retreat. They managed to surprise and capture a company of the 36th Illinois, but many were freed when Sigel's withdrawing men unexpectedly bumped into them. Sigel managed to fight his way through Gates' men, helped by a blunder by Confederate Brig. Gen. James M. McIntosh.

Key commanders (Trans-Mississippi District)
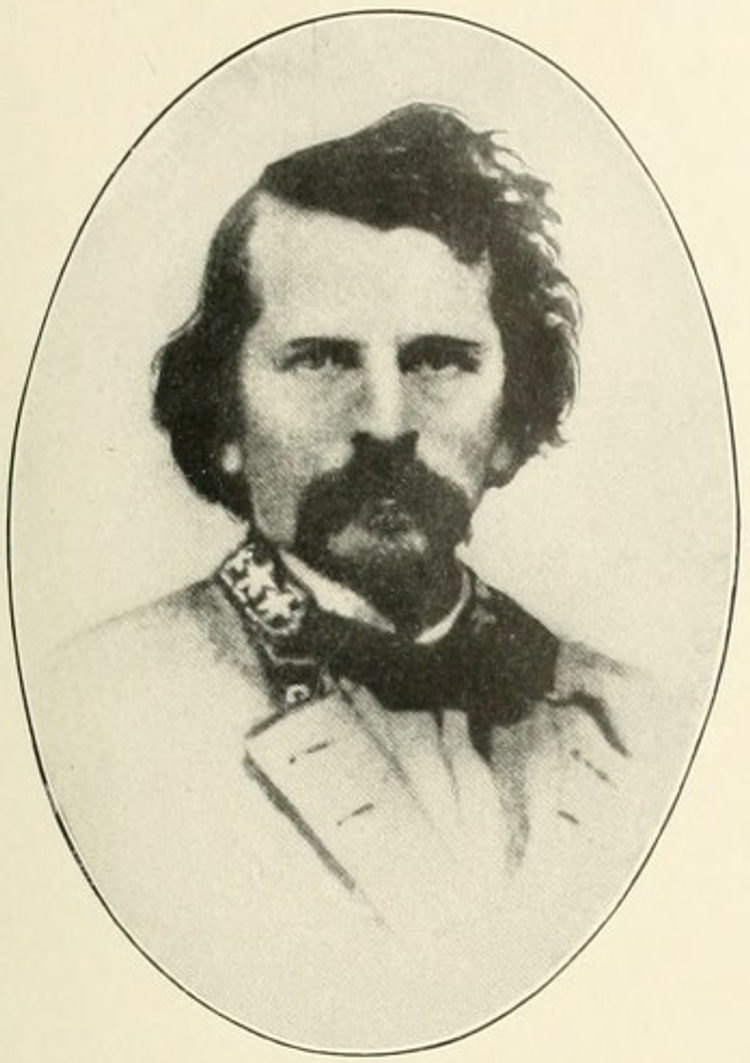
Maj. Gen.
Earl Van Dorn, Commanding

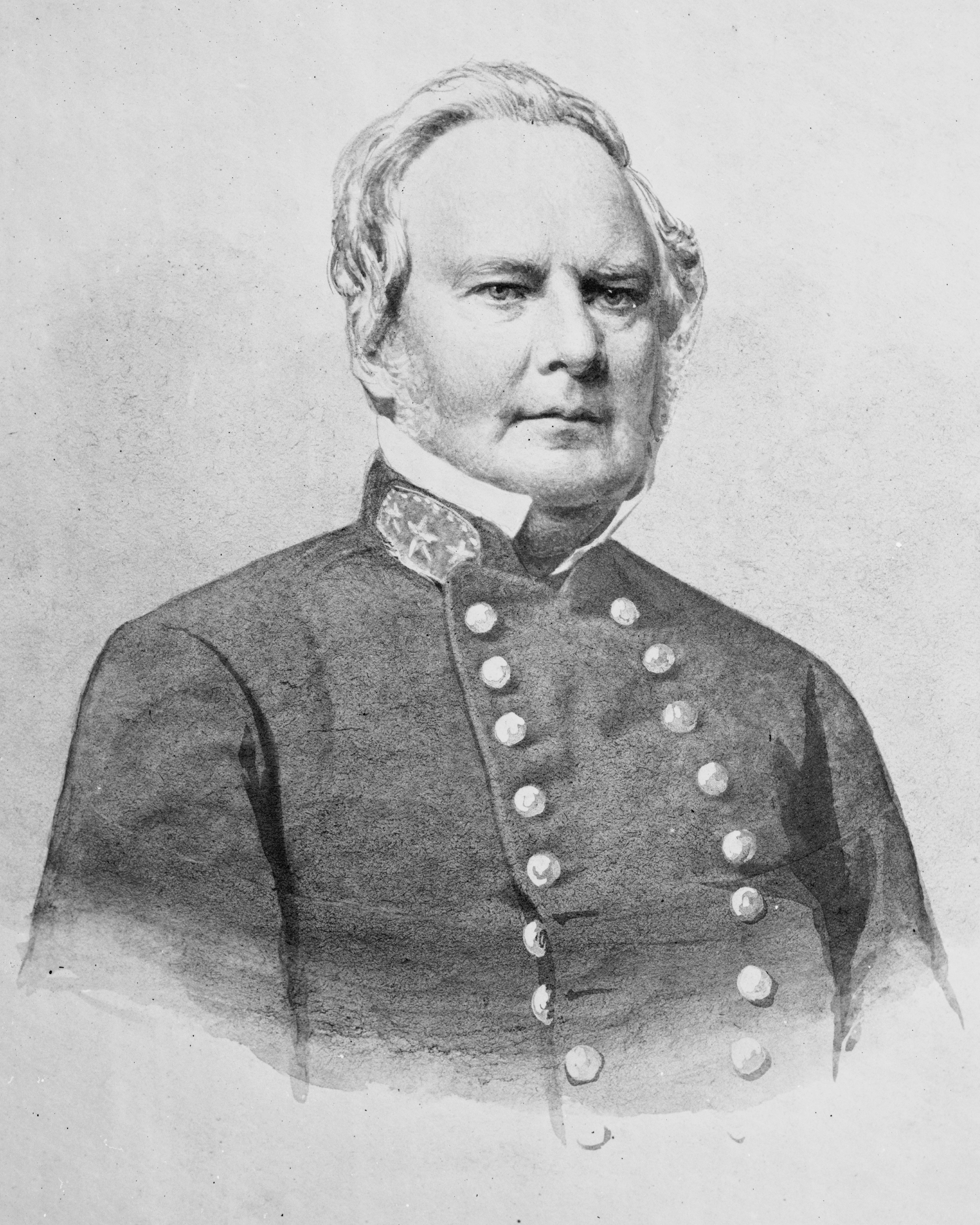
Maj. Gen.
Sterling Price,
Mo. State Guard
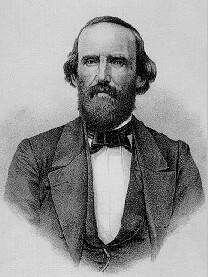
Brig. Gen.
Benjamin McCulloch,
McCulloch's Division

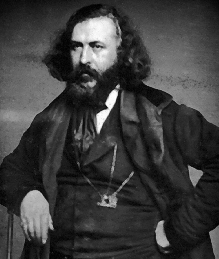
Brig. Gen.
Albert Pike, Department of Indian Territory

McIntosh had planned to envelop Sigel's force from the northwest while Gates closed the trap on the south. However, McIntosh mistakenly took his 3,000-man cavalry brigade too far up a northerly road. After marching three miles out of his way, he turned his troopers onto the road leading east into the Little Sugar Creek valley. By the time they reached the site where Sigel's northeast road met McIntosh's east-bound road, the Federal general's men had already passed the intersection thus avoiding a disaster. When the 3rd Texas Cavalry charged, they ran smack into Sigel's main line. The Confederates lost 10 men while 20 or more were wounded by Federal artillery and rifle fire and the Union position held.

=== Geography ===
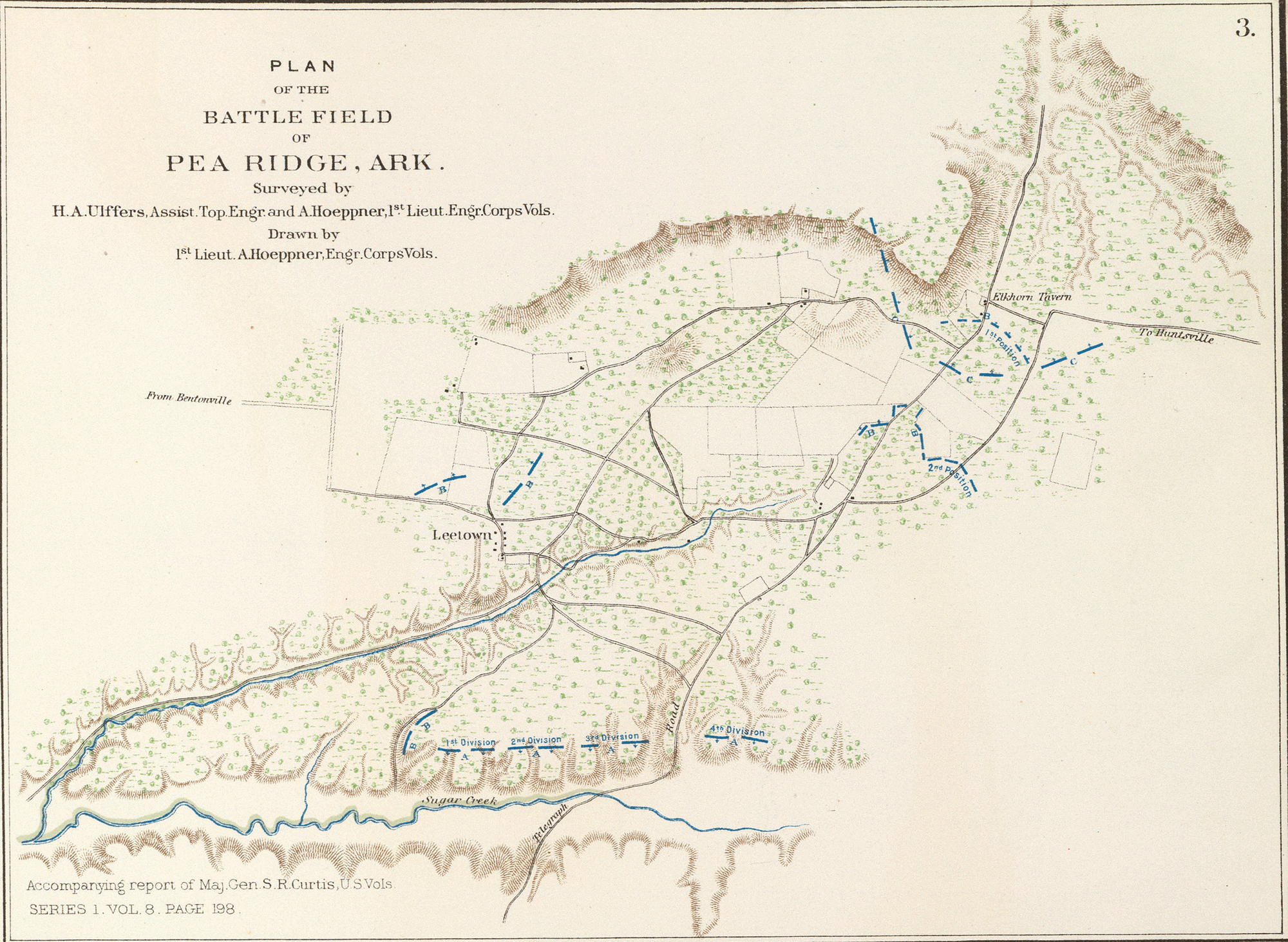
Plan of the Battlefield of Pea Ridge

Curtis placed his four small divisions astride the Telegraph or Wire Road in a fortified position atop the bluffs north of Little Sugar Creek. From the creek, the Telegraph Road went northeast to Elkhorn Tavern where it intersected the Huntsville Road leading east, and Ford Road leading west. From Elkhorn, the Wire Road continued north and down into Cross Timber Hollow before crossing the border into Missouri. From there, the Federal supply line followed the Telegraph Road northeast to St. Louis. The hamlet of Leetown lay north-west of the Telegraph Road, about halfway between Curtis's position on the bluffs and Ford Road. Curtis made his headquarters at Pratt's Store, located on the Wire Road between Elkhorn and Little Sugar Creek.

Van Dorn sought the Federal rear via the Bentonville Detour. This ran from Camp Stephens, west of Curtis's position, northeast onto the Pea Ridge plateau. At Twelve Corner Church, which still stands today, Ford Road branched east to Elkhorn; the Detour continued northeast, meeting the Wire Road just north of Cross Timber Hollow. South of the Bentonville Detour, west of Cross Timber Hollow, and north of Ford Road lay the militarily impassable Big Mountain.

On the night of March 6, Col. Grenville Dodge, with Curtis's approval, led several parties to obstruct the Bentonville Detour, felling trees on the road between Twelve Corner Church and Cross Timber Hollow. That same evening, Van Dorn's army, Price's Division leading, began the long march to Cross Timber Hollow. The night march was slowed by clearing Dodge's obstructions, Van Dorn's lack of an engineer corps, poor staff work, and the soldiers' exhaustion.

== Battle, March 7 ==
=== Contact ===
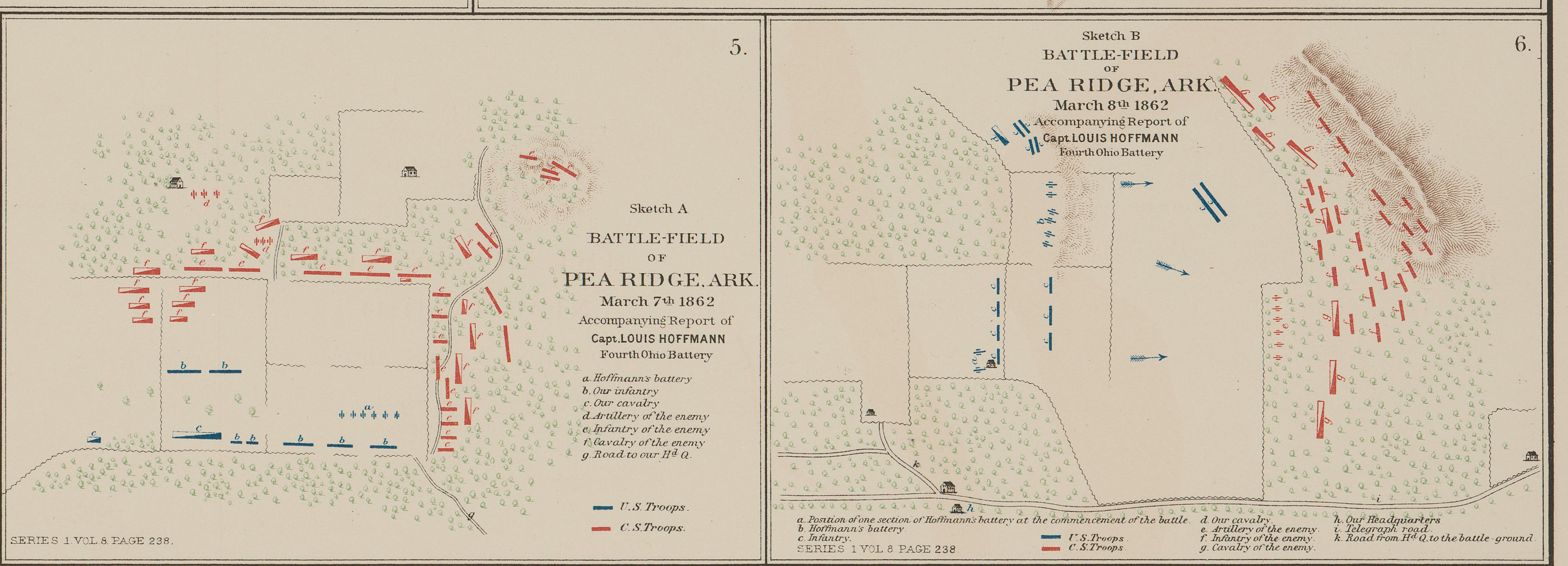
Battle of Pea Ridge (Day 1 and Day 2)

Van Dorn had planned for both his divisions to reach Cross Timber Hollow, but by dawn, only the head of Price's division had made it that far. Because of the delay, Van Dorn instructed McCulloch's division to take the Ford Road from Twelve Corner Church and meet Price at Elkhorn.

That morning, Federal patrols detected both threats. Not knowing where the Confederate main body was located, Curtis sent Dodge's brigade of Col. Eugene A. Carr's 4th Division northeast up the Wire Road to join the 24th Missouri Infantry at Elkhorn Tavern. But Dodge, still worried about the threat to the Federal rear, had disobeyed orders and pulled his brigade back to Pratt's Store, available to immediately reinforce Elkhorn. Curtis also sent a task force under Col. Peter J. Osterhaus north to reconnoiter along Ford Road. Osterhaus' force consisted of Col. Nicholas Greusel's brigade of his own 1st Division, several cavalry units led by Col. Cyrus Bussey, and twelve cannons.

=== Leetown ===
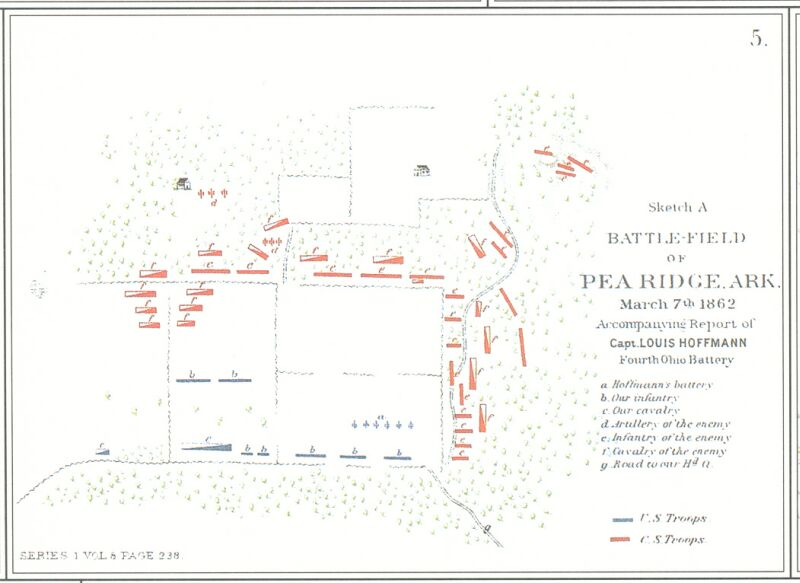
Troop arrangement at the Battle of Leetown

McCulloch's force consisted of a cavalry brigade under Brigadier General James McIntosh, an infantry brigade under Col. Louis Hébert, and a combined force of Cherokee, Chickasaw, Choctaw, Creek, and Seminole cavalry under Brig. Gen. Albert Pike. McCulloch's troops swung west on the Ford Road and plowed into elements of the Federal army at a small village named Leetown, where a fierce firefight erupted.

At 11:30 a.m. Osterhaus rode north through a belt of timber onto Foster Farm and witnessed an astonishing sight. McCulloch's entire division was marching east on Ford Road only a few hundred yards away. Despite the odds, Osterhaus ordered Bussey's small force to attack to buy time for his infantry brigade to deploy. Three Federal cannon began shelling the Southerners, killing at least ten. McCulloch wheeled McIntosh's 3,000 horsemen to the south to attack. The massed Confederate charge overwhelmed Bussey's force, stampeding them and capturing the cannons. A little further west, two companies of the 3rd Iowa ran into Pike's Cherokee and were similarly routed. The Iowa unit's unusual killed-to-wounded ratio, 24 killed and 17 wounded, suggests that the Native American warriors killed a number of wounded Northerners. This incident tarnished Pike's image and reputation for the duration of his life giving evidence that the Native Americans laid finishing blows on the wounded as well as scalped and mutilated some in the surprised Union troop.

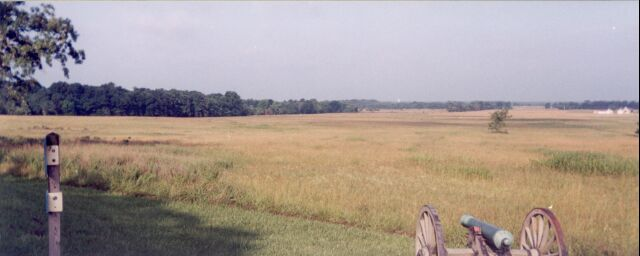
Lee Town fight

South of the belt of timber lay Oberson's Field, where Greusel had time to form his brigade and nine cannon on the forest edge on the south side. Sul Ross alertly led the 6th Texas Cavalry in pursuit of Bussey's force. But when Ross rode into the field, his men were fired on and quickly fell back. Greusel shook out two companies of skirmishers from the 36th Illinois and posted them along the southern edge of the belt of timber between Oberson's and Foster's fields. The Federal gunners began lobbing shells over the belt of timber. Though the howitzers were fired blindly, their first shell bursts panicked the Cherokee, who rapidly retreated and could not be rallied. Meanwhile, McCulloch had formed Louis Hébert's 4,000-man infantry brigade across a wide front and sent them south. Hébert took control of the four regiments east of the north-south Leetown Road, while McCulloch took charge of the four regiments west of the road.

The Texan general McCulloch rode forward into the belt of timber to personally reconnoiter the Federal positions, and coming into range of the Illinois skirmishers was shot through the heart. McIntosh was notified after a delay that he was in command, but his staff, fearing that the death of their popular leader would dishearten his soldiers, made the unwise decision not to share the bad news with many of the subordinate officers. Without consulting Hébert, or anyone else, McIntosh impulsively led his former regiment, the dismounted 2nd Arkansas Mounted Rifles Regiment into the attack. As the unit reached the southern edge of the belt of timber, it was met with a massed volley from Greusel's brigade and McIntosh dropped dead with a bullet in him. In the meantime, unaware that he was now in command of the division, Hébert led the left wing of the attack south into the woods. Meanwhile, the colonels of the right wing regiments withdrew to await orders from Hébert. It was about 2:00 p.m. The blind Federal bombardment of Foster's Farm and the breakdown in the Confederate command structure began to destroy the morale of McCulloch's division.

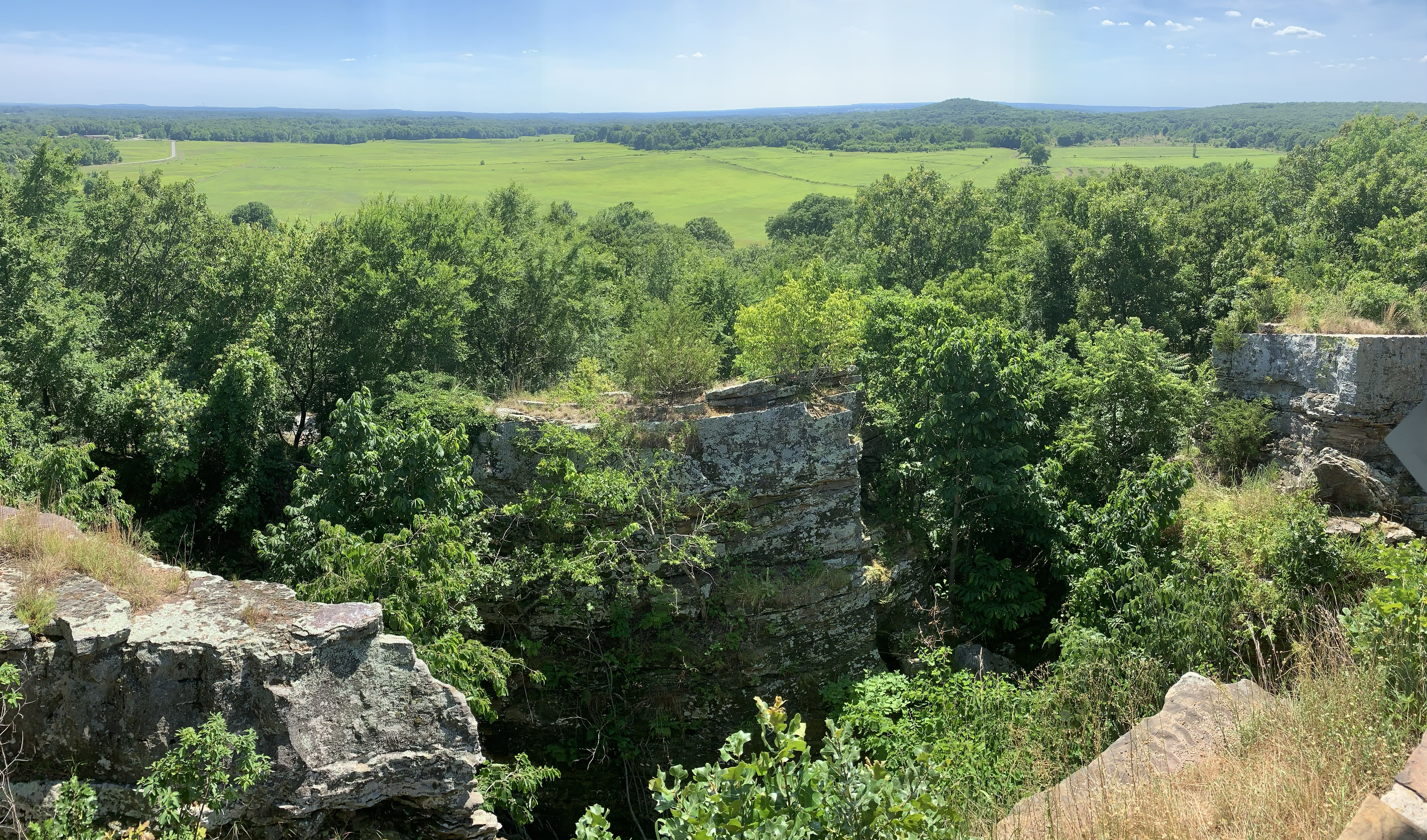
Confederate position overlooking Pea Ridge battleground.

Hébert's powerful attack was stopped in the nick of time by Col. Jefferson C. Davis and the 3rd Division. Davis was originally destined for Elkhorn, but Curtis diverted his troops to Leetown after Osterhaus' report reached him. The four Southern regiments nearly overran Davis' leading brigade under Col. Julius White.

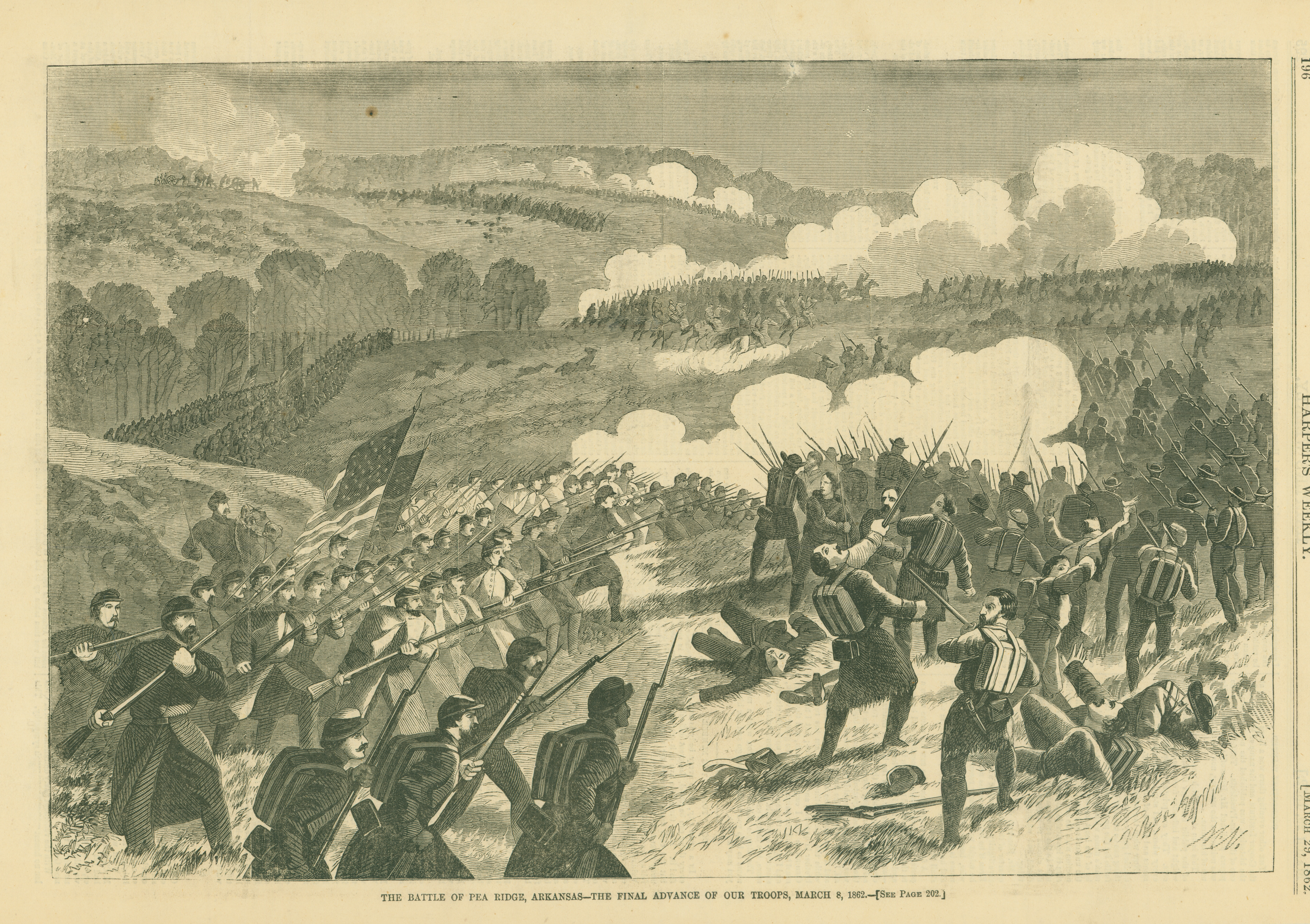
Defeat of Rebel forces at the battle of Pea Ridge, Harper's Weekly.

Davis ordered a cavalry battalion to charge, but this effort was easily routed by the Southern infantry. When Col. Thomas Pattison's brigade arrived, Davis sent them up a forest trail to envelop Hébert's open left flank. Untroubled by the inert Confederate units on Foster's Farm, Osterhaus was able to "box in" Hébert's right flank. After very hard fighting in dense woods, the Confederates, pressed from three sides, were driven back to the Ford Road. In the smoky confusion, Hébert and a small party, having become separated from the rest of the left wing, blundered through a gap in the Federal lines and got lost in the woods. Later that day, a Federal cavalry unit captured Hébert and his group.

At this point, command of McCulloch's division would normally have devolved upon Col. Elkanah Greer, the commander of the 3rd Texas Cavalry Regiment, but due to the prevailing command confusion, he was not notified of his superior officers' death or capture for several hours. In the meantime, Brig. Gen. Albert Pike, technically outside the chain of command of McCulloch's division assumed command on the Leetown battlefield around 3:00 p.m. At 3:30 p.m., even as Hébert was still battling in the woods, Pike decided to lead the regiments nearest to him in retreat back to Twelve Corners Church. This movement took place in total confusion, several units being left behind on the field, some marching back towards Camp Stephens, others around Big Mountain towards Van Dorn and the rest of the army. At least one regiment was at this point ordered to discard its arms and bury them for later recovery. It was only several hours later that Greer assumed command of the remaining forces and was at that point informed of Pike's actions. Initially, he considered remaining on the battlefield but after consulting with Van Dorn decided to withdraw his forces as well and join the remainder of the army in Cross Timber Hollow.

=== Elkhorn Tavern ===
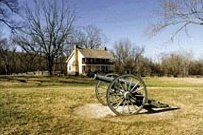
Pea Ridge National Military Park

Around 9:30 a.m., Cearnal's cavalry battalion in Price's advance guard bumped into a company of the 24th Missouri Volunteer Infantry in Cross Timber Hollow. Soon after, Carr arrived at Elkhorn Tavern with Dodge's brigade right behind. Carr spread out his regiments facing north along the edge of the plateau near the tavern and pulled the 24th Missouri back to cover their left flank at the base of Big Mountain. The Fourth Division commander then sent the 1st Iowa Battery's four guns forward to slow the Confederate advance.

At this point, Van Dorn, instead of rushing Carr's badly outnumbered force with all 5,000 of his available soldiers, became cautious and ordered Price to fully deploy his division, with the Missouri State Guard divisions on the right and the Confederate Missouri brigades on the left. When the Northern guns began firing, Van Dorn ordered his own artillery into action. Soon, 21 Southern guns were pounding the Iowa cannoneers. By the time Price's infantry finally began edging uphill toward the Yankee guns, they met Carr's men advancing downhill in an aggressive counterstroke. The Confederate advance stalled near Elkhorn, but Price's left flank units were marching up Williams Hollow further to the east. Once this force reached the plateau, Carr's right flank would be turned.

By 12:30 p.m., Carr's second brigade, Vandever's, arrived at Elkhorn. The Federal division commander immediately launched this unit in a counterattack on Price's right flank. Superior numbers of Southerners eventually forced Vandever to pull back a short distance uphill. At 2:00 p.m. Van Dorn found out that McCulloch's division would not be meeting Price's at Elkhorn. At this time, Henry Little, on his own initiative, waved his 1st Missouri Brigade forward and the Rebel advance began to roll uphill. These events finally convinced Van Dorn to take more aggressive action. Price was wounded but remained in charge of his left wing while Van Dorn took tactical control of the Confederate right wing. But more time was lost in reorganizing Price's division to attack. Meanwhile, Curtis was rushing small units to Carr's assistance as quickly as he could. Carr himself was wounded three times: in the ankle, neck and arm, but refused to leave the field. In 1894 he would be awarded the Medal of Honor for his actions this day.

About 4:30 p.m. Price's left emerged from Williams Hollow and attacked, outflanking Carr's line. On the right, Dodge's brigade collapsed after putting up a terrific fight at Clemon's farm. On the left, in equally hard fighting, Vandever's men were steadily pushed back to the tavern and beyond. In the center, Little led his men forward into the teeth of Federal artillery. After being forced back from position after position, Vandever's men finally halted the Confederate drive at Ruddick's field, over a quarter mile south of the tavern. There they were joined by Dodge's men, part of Alexander S. Asboth's 2nd Division and Curtis. At 6:30 p.m., Curtis launched a brief counter-attack, but soon recalled his men in the dark.

== Battle, March 8 ==
=== Night ===
Temperatures fell rapidly after dark, making a very uncomfortable night for the men of both armies. Curtis called Davis' 3rd Division to Ruddick's field during the night. When Davis arrived he was put in line to the left of Carr. Sigel marched the 1st and 2nd Divisions in circles all night but finally had them camp near Pratt's Store. Asboth, who was wounded in the last action of the day, believed that the United States Army's position was hopeless and pressed Curtis several times during the night to retreat. Though his army was now cut off from Missouri, Curtis refused to consider retreat and confidently predicted victory in the morning.

By a night march, a number of regiments and artillery batteries from McCulloch's Division, led by Greer, reached Van Dorn via the Bentonville Detour and Cross Timber Hollow. Van Dorn was unaware that his supply train had been mistakenly ordered back to Camp Stephens during the previous afternoon and evening. In the morning, the Confederate reserve artillery ammunition would be hopelessly out of reach.

=== Second day ===
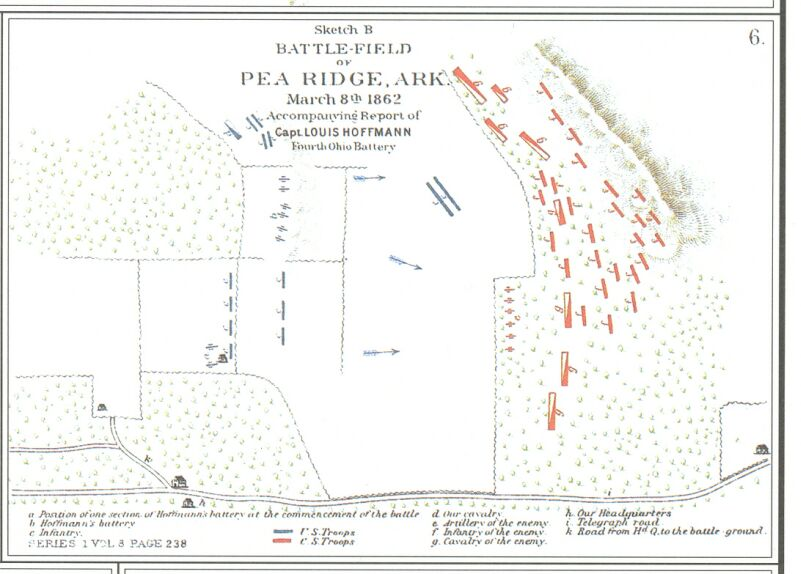
Troop deployment at Elkhorn Tavern

In the early morning, Sigel sent Osterhaus to scout the open prairie to the west of Elkhorn. The colonel discovered a knoll that promised to make an excellent artillery position and reported it to Sigel. Osterhaus also suggested that the 1st and 2nd Divisions simply march up the Telegraph Road and deploy on Davis' left, rather than retrace the route of the previous evening; Sigel agreed with his advice and his wing was put into motion. In the meantime, Davis ordered an Illinois battery to fire a few salvos into the woods opposite his position. This provoked a sharp Confederate reaction. Three Southern batteries opened fire, causing two Federal batteries to retreat and Davis to pull his men out of the open and back into the woods. This was followed by a Confederate probe which was quickly driven back.

Soon Sigel's men extended in a long line to the left of Davis. By 8:00 a.m., Asboth's division took its place on the far left, then came Osterhaus, Davis and Carr, with the Federal line generally facing north. It was possibly the only time during the war an entire army was visibly deployed in one continuous line of battle from flank to flank. Sigel now massed 21 cannons on the open knoll to the west of Elkhorn. With Sigel in personal control, the Federal artillery began an extremely effective fire against the 12 Southern guns opposed to them. When the Confederate gunners pulled back under the deadly fire, Van Dorn ordered two batteries to take their place. After one of the new batteries panicked and fled, Van Dorn put its commander under arrest. But the Southern commander was unable to counter Sigel's devastating fire. Return fire from the Confederate artillery was ineffective and few Federals were killed.

With the opposing guns rendered nearly harmless, Sigel directed his gunners to fire into the woods at the Confederate infantry. Near the base of Big Mountain the projectiles created a deadly combination of rock shrapnel and wood splinters, driving the 2nd Missouri Brigade from its positions. "It was one of the few times in the Civil War when a preparatory artillery barrage effectively softened up an enemy position and paved the way for an infantry assault." During the bombardment, Sigel's infantry edged forward so that by 9:30 a.m. his divisions had executed a right wheel and faced to the northeast. By this time Van Dorn found that his reserve artillery ammunition was with the wagon train, a six-hour march away. The Southern commander bitterly realized that he had no hope of victory and decided to retreat via the Huntsville Road. This route led east from the tavern, then turned south. With Price wounded but still in command of the rear guard, Van Dorn's army began to move toward the Huntsville Road in some confusion.

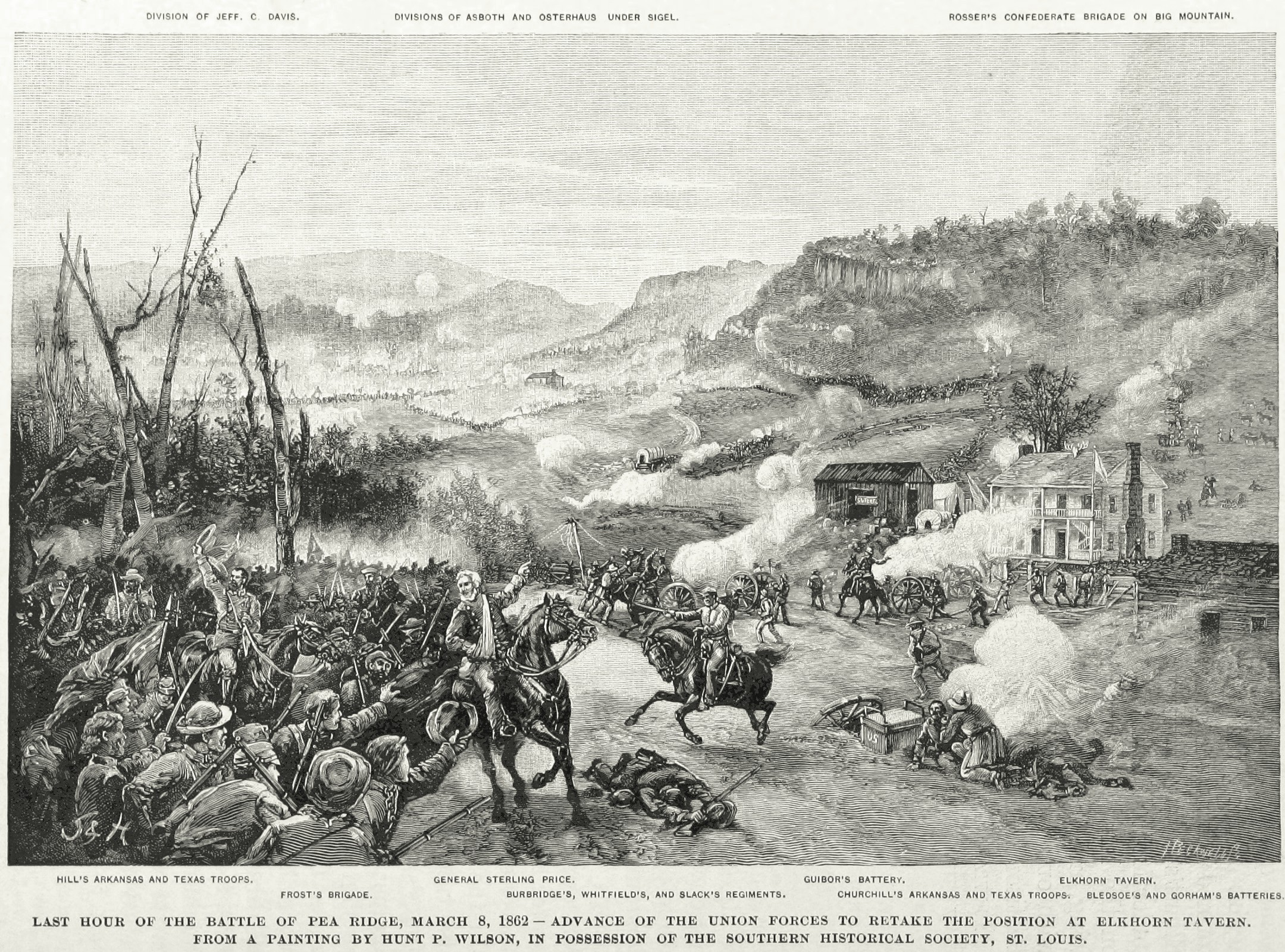
The last hour of the battle

At 10:30 a.m., Sigel sent his two divisions forward into the attack. On the far left, Asboth's regiments drove the 2nd Cherokee Mounted Rifles from the point of Big Mountain. Osterhaus was resisted by Little's 1st Missouri Brigade. Soon, Curtis ordered Davis to attack in the center. Not realizing that the Confederate army was retreating past his right flank, Curtis held Carr's mauled division in position on the right.

Van Dorn joined the retreat about 11:00 a.m. Sometime around noon, Sigel's soldiers met Davis' men near Elkhorn Tavern and a great cry of "Victory" was sent up. A number of Southerners were cut off and escaped up the Wire Road into Cross Timber Hollow. From there the infantry retraced their steps on the Bentonville Detour. Several batteries marched northeast into Missouri then south through the Ozarks. In the confusion, Curtis failed to understand that Van Dorn had escaped on the Huntsville Road. Thinking that Van Dorn had retreated via Cross Timber Hollow, he sent Sigel and some cavalry to pursue in that direction. Instead of taking the forces Curtis assigned for the pursuit, Sigel gathered both of his divisions and marched northeast toward Keetsville, Missouri. Near there, he requested that Curtis send his supply train to that place. "I am going forward not backward," remarked an annoyed Curtis to his staff. On March 9, Sigel finally returned to the battlefield and admitted that the Southern main body had not retreated by way of Missouri.

== Aftermath ==
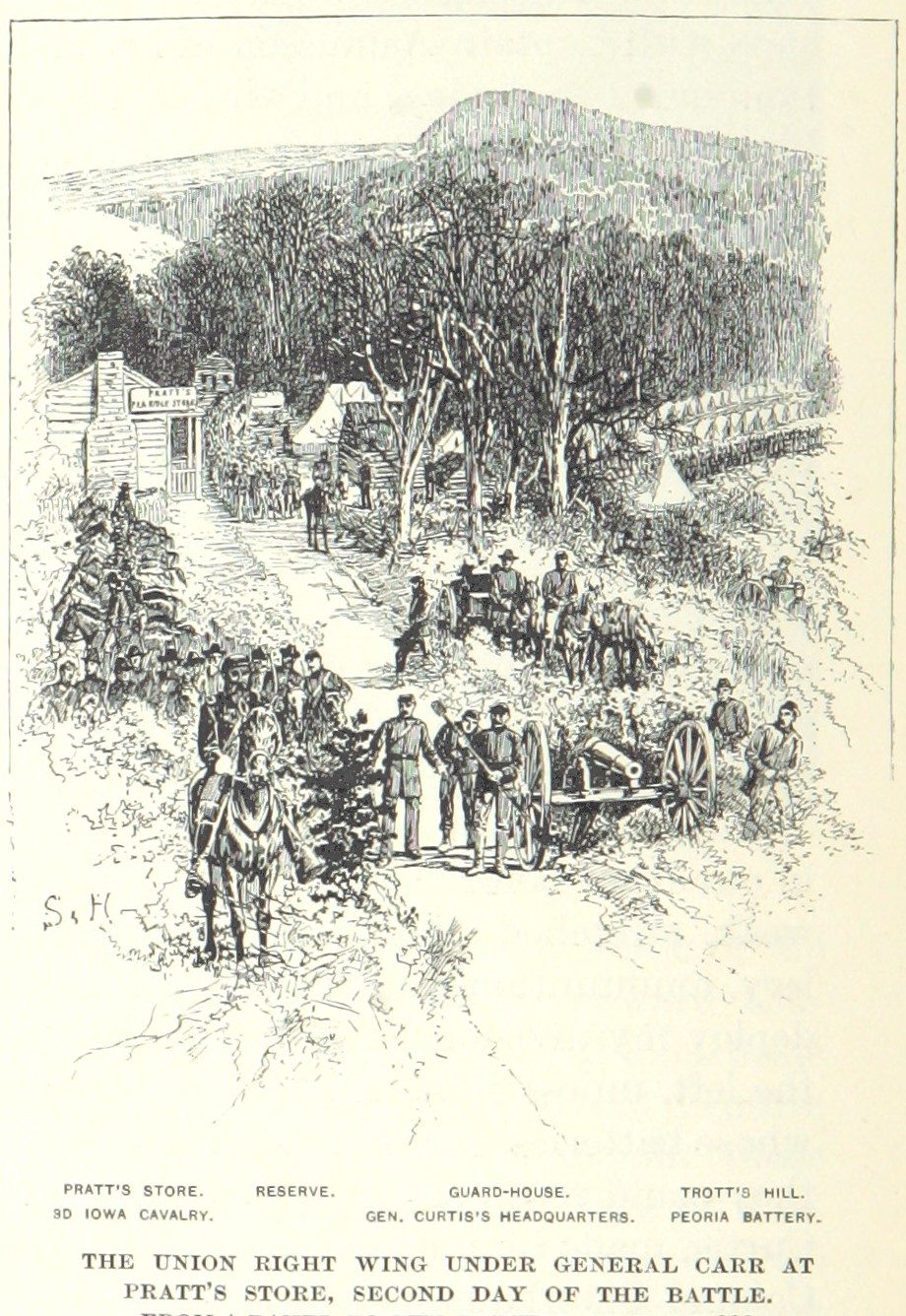
Curtis's headquarters at Pratt's Store

Federal forces reported 203 killed, 980 wounded and 201 missing for a total of 1,384 casualties. Of these, Carr's 4th Division lost 682, almost all in its action on the first day, and Davis' 3rd Division lost 344. Both Asboth and Carr were wounded but remained in command of their divisions. Van Dorn reported his losses as 800 killed and wounded, with between 200 and 300 prisoners, but these are probably too low. A more recent estimate is that the Confederates suffered approximately 2,000 casualties in the Battle of Pea Ridge. These losses included a large proportion of senior officers. Generals McCulloch, McIntosh, and William Y. Slack were killed or mortally wounded, and Price wounded. Among colonels, Hébert was captured, and Benjamin Rives was mortally wounded, with two other colonels captured and one wounded.

Separated from their supply train, Van Dorn's main body retreated through very sparsely settled country for a week, living off what little food they could take from the inhabitants. They finally reunited with their supply train south of the Boston Mountains, but thousands of Price's troops deserted and returned to Missouri. Pike meanwhile, believing that the Confederate army had been destroyed, returned to the Indian Territory. Van Dorn refused to admit that he was defeated "but only failed in my intentions". With the defeat at Pea Ridge, the Confederates never again seriously threatened the state of Missouri. Within weeks Van Dorn's army was transferred across the Mississippi River to bolster the Confederate Army of Tennessee, leaving Arkansas virtually defenseless.

With his victory, Curtis sent some of his troops east of the Mississippi and proceeded with the remainder of his army to move east to West Plains, Missouri. Then he turned south into undefended northeast Arkansas. He had hopes of capturing Little Rock, but this proved impossible because of a lack of supplies and because guerrillas had cut his supply lines. Instead, following the approximate course of the White River, Curtis continued south and seized Helena, Arkansas, on July 12.

Curtis remained confident and exercised effective overall control of his outnumbered army through the two days of fighting. He was well served by three of his four division commanders, Osterhaus, Davis and Carr. His brigade commanders Dodge, Vandever and Greusel also performed well. Sigel's generalship on the morning of March 8 was generally commended. However, his erratic behavior on other occasions and his attempt to claim credit for the victory led to a rift with Curtis. Sigel was soon transferred to a command in Virginia.

Van Dorn ignored logistics and failed to control his army. When McCulloch was killed, his division fell apart while Van Dorn absorbed himself in the tactical details of Price's fight. His staff lost contact with his wagon train at a critical moment and committed many other errors. After the battle, "Nobody was whipped at the Battle of Pea Ridge, but Van Dorn" became a common saying among soldiers. Of all the Southern officers, Henry Little showed the most ability, becoming the "de facto commander of Price's division" at the end of the battle.

== Battlefield preservation ==
The battlefield at Pea Ridge is now Pea Ridge National Military Park, founded in 1956, one of the best-preserved civil war battlefields. A reconstruction of Elkhorn Tavern, scene of the heaviest fighting, stands at the original location. The park also includes a 2.5-mile (4.0 km) section of the Trail of Tears.

== See also ==
- List of costliest American Civil War land battles
- Troop engagements of the American Civil War, 1862
