= Leetown, Arkansas =

Leetown, Arkansas Lee Town, Arkansas
- Village
- Town of Lee
- Location in the state of Arkansas Leetown (the United States)
- Coordinates: 36°25′53″N 94°02′51″W
- Country: United States
- State: Arkansas
- County: Benton
- Settled: 1840s
- Named after: John W. Lee
- Elevation: 1,394 ft (425 m)
- Time zone: UTC−06:00 (CST)
  - Summer (DST): UTC−05:00 (CDT)
- ZIP code: 72732
- Area code: 479
- GNIS feature ID: 75584
- Major airport: XNA

Leetown, also known as Lee Town, was a historic village in Benton County, Arkansas, United States. The first day of the Battle of Pea Ridge was fought around Leetown.

== History ==
Leetown was founded in the 1840s, by John W. Lee, a farmer from Tennessee. Little is known about the village prior to the American Civil War. It is historically significant for its role as a field hospital for the U.S. Army during the Battle of Pea Ridge. Most, if not all, buildings and structures were used as field hospitals. There are no period buildings remaining, but period fences have been replaced and historic roads have been restored. An active reforestation program has been carried out.
