= Edwin O. Stanard =

American politician (1832–1914)

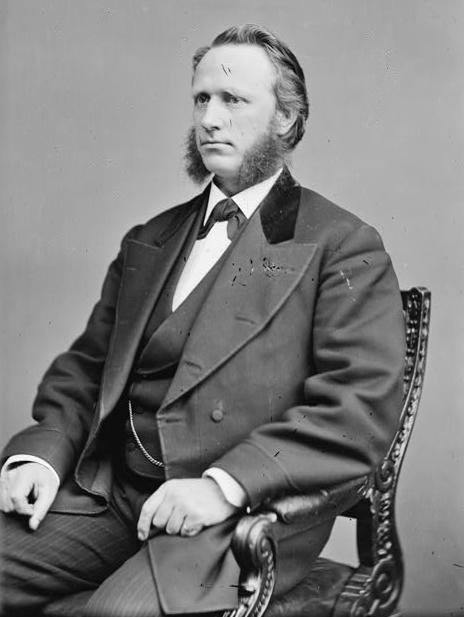
- Brady-Handy collection portrait of Stanard, between 1865 and 1880

Member of the U.S. House of Representatives from Missouri's 1st district
- In office March 4, 1873 – March 3, 1875
- Preceded by: Erastus Wells
- Succeeded by: Edward C. Kehr

14th Lieutenant Governor of Missouri
- In office 1869–1871
- Governor: Joseph W. McClurg
- Preceded by: George Smith
- Succeeded by: Joseph J. Gravely

Personal details
- Born: Edwin Obed Stanard; January 5, 1832 Newport, New Hampshire, US
- Died: March 11, 1914 (aged 82) St. Louis, Missouri, US
- Resting place: Bellefontaine Cemetery
- Party: Republican
- Occupation: Politician, businessman

Edwin Obed Stanard (January 5, 1832 – March 11, 1914) was an American politician and businessman. A Republican, he was lieutenant governor of Missouri and a member of the United States House of Representatives from Missouri.

== Early life ==
Stanard was born on January 5, 1832, in Newport, New Hampshire. His was a son of Obed Standard and Elizabeth Ann Webster. Edwin's great-great grandfather, William Stanard, served in the Revolutionary War as a corporal in Captain Uriah Wilson's company, Colonel Benjamin Bellows' regiment, reinforcing the American army at the Siege of Fort Ticonderoga in 1777.

In 1836, he and his parents moved to the Iowa Territory, where he was educated preparatory schools. In 1853, he moved to St. Louis, and in 1854 and 1855, worked as an educator in Madison County, Illinois. He graduated from the St. Louis Commercial College in 1855, becoming a banker the following year.

== Career ==
He started his grain business career in 1857. From 1865 to 1886, he ran the grain business E. O. Stanard & Company. In 1867, the partnership between E. O. Stanard & Co. and the associated Stanard & Slayback of New Orleans, LA was dissolved. Charles Slayback continued the New Orleans branch under the name Charles E. Slayback & Co.

He was Vice President of the Merchants Exchange in 1865 and President in 1866. He was also a member of the Merchant Exchange's Mississippi River Improvement Committee along with David R. Francis, Geo L. Wright, H. C. Haarstick, M. McEnnis, and Frank Gaiennie.

The E. O. Stanard Milling Company was incorporated in 1885. The incorporators were Edwin, his son William, and E. P. Bronson. The company owned flouring mills in St. Louis, Alton and Texas. Its flour mill in Dallas is listed on the National Register of Historic Places. The company became the Stanard-Tilton Milling Company in January 1906. They produced well known brands including Stanard’s Royal Patent, Alton City Mill Roller Process, Burbridge’s Best, Stanard’s Best, and Eagle Steam.

He served on the first Board of Directors of the St. Louis Trust Company, which was founded in 1889 with an authorized capital of 2.5 million dollars. He was president of the Citizens' Fire Insurance Company for fourteen years. In 1897 and 1898, he was a member of the Indianapolis Monetary Convention. He was also on the Board of Directors of the St. Louis, Vandalia and Haute Terre Railroad Company He was a leader in the Autumnal Festivities Association and in 1903, he served as the President of the directorate of the St. Louis Exposition.

=== Politics ===
Stanard was a Republican. From 1869 to 1871, he served as lieutenant governor of Missouri under Governor McClurg. In 1870, he ran unsuccessfully for mayor of St. Louis. He was a member of the United States House of Representatives from March 4, 1873, to March 3, 1875, representing Missouri's 1st district. He lost the following election.

During the 1880 Republican National Convention, he served on its Arrangements Committee; he was also a delegate to the 1896 Convention.

== Personal life ==
He was a Methodist and served as president of the Missouri Sunday School Association in 1868. He was a general officer of the Sons of the American Revolution. Social clubs included the St. Louis Club, the Noonday Club and the New England Society of St. Louis.

He married Esther Ann Kauffman (1833–1906) in 1856 in Iowa City, Iowa. They had five children:

- Charles Edwin, died in infancy.
- Cora Zerviah (1859–1909), who married Edgar D. Tilton (1853–1917), vice president of the E. O. Stanard Milling Company.
- William Kauffman Standard (1861–1934). Married Mary Tillay (1868–1893) in 1885. He then married Anne Winsor Chew (1876–1954) in 1895.
- Ella Sue (1867–1946), who married Dr. John Frederick Shoemaker (1868–1931) in 1908.
- Edwin O. Jr. (1869–1899)

He died on March 11, 1914, aged 82, in St. Louis, from a myocardial infarction. He was buried at Bellefontaine Cemetery.

Political offices
Preceded by George Smith	Lieutenant Governor of Missouri; 1869–1871	Succeeded by Joseph J. Gravely
U.S. House of Representatives
Preceded by Erastus Wells	Member of the U.S. House of Representatives from Missouri's 1st congressional district March 4, 1873 – March 3, 1875	Succeeded by Edward C. Kehr
