= United States v. Eaton (1898) =

- Supreme Court of the United States

Argued January 4, 1898 Decided February 28, 1898
- Full case name: United States v. Eaton
- Citations: 169 U.S. 331 (more)

Holding
- Congress may authorize an inferior officer to temporarily exercise the powers of a principal officer despite not being appointed with the advice and consent of the Senate.

Court membership
- Chief Justice Melville Fuller Associate Justices John M. Harlan · Horace Gray; David J. Brewer · Henry B. Brown; George Shiras Jr. · Edward D. White; Rufus W. Peckham · Joseph McKenna

Case opinion
- Majority: White, joined by unanimous

Laws applied
- U.S. Const. art. II, § 2, cl. 2

United States v. Eaton, 169 U.S. 331 (1898), was a decision of the Supreme Court of the United States involving the Appointments Clause holding that the United States Congress had the power to authorize the President of the United States to recognize a temporary diplomatic official during a period of unavailability of the congressionally approved appointee to the position.

In October 1890, Sempronius H. Boyd was commissioned as Minister Resident and Consul General of the United States to Siam. He qualified and proceeded to his post, but became seriously ill in June 1892. Boyd was granted a leave of absence by the President, and before leaving Siam, Boyd asked a resident American missionary, Lewis A. Eaton, to take charge of the consulate and its archives. After being sworn in by Boyd, Eaton performed the duties of the consul general until Robert M. Boyd, arrived in Siam and qualified for the position in May 1893. Sempronius Boyd died in 1894, and both Eaton and the estate of Sempronius Boyd sued for payment of the salary due to the consul general for the period up until Robert Boyd took over, Eaton on the theory that he had performed the job, and Boyd's estate on the theory that even after his return to the United States, he officially retained the title. The lower courts held that Eaton was properly entitled to this payment and Boyd was not, and the Supreme Court upheld this outcome.

The case was cited in 2017 as an argument in favor of the legitimacy of the appointment by President Donald Trump of Matthew Whitaker as Acting United States Attorney General following the resignation of Jeff Sessions from the office.
