= Joseph J. Gravely =

American politician (1828–1872)

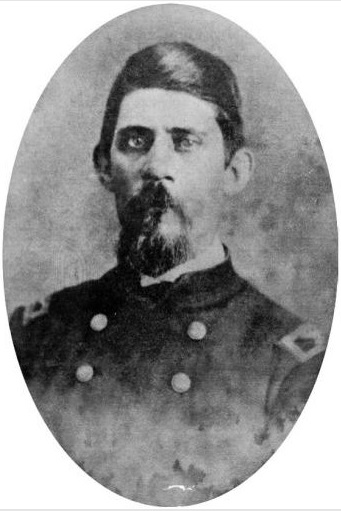
- Gravely, c. 1864

Member of the U.S. House of Representatives from Missouri's 4th district
- In office March 4, 1867 – March 3, 1869
- Preceded by: John R. Kelso
- Succeeded by: Sempronius H. Boyd

lieutenant governor of Missouri
- In office 1871 – April 28, 1872
- Preceded by: Edwin O. Stanard
- Succeeded by: Charles Phillip Johnson

Member of the Virginia House of Representatives
- In office 1853–1854

Member of the Missouri House of Representatives
- In office 1862–1864

Personal details
- Born: Joseph Jackson Gravely; September 25, 1828 Henry County, Virginia, US
- Died: April 28, 1872 (aged 43) Stockton, Missouri, US
- Party: Republican
- Other political affiliations: Unconditional Union
- Occupation: Politician

Joseph Jackson Gravely (September 25, 1828 – April 28, 1872) was an American politician. A Republican, he was a member of the United States House of Representatives from Missouri. He also served as lieutenant governor of Missouri.

== Early life ==
Gravely was born on September 25, 1828, near the Leatherwood Plantation, in Henry County, Virginia, the son of Lewis Gravely and Rachel Martha (née Dyer) Gravely. He was educated at common schools, then worked as an educator and operated a farm. He studied law and was admitted to the bar.

== Career ==
Gravely was a Republican and also held political affiliations with the Unconditional Union Party. In 1853 and 1854, he served in the Virginia House of Delegates. In 1854, Gravely moved to Cedar County, Missouri, then was a delegate to the 1860 Missouri Constitutional Convention. In 1862 and 1864, he served in the Missouri House of Representatives.

During the American Civil War, Gravely joined the Union army. In early 1861, he enlisted into the Home Guard. He was made a second lieutenant in Company A of the 13th Missouri State Militia Cavalry Regiment, later becoming captain then commander of the regiment. In 1864, he was made colonel of the 14th Missouri State Militia Cavalry Regiment. For a time, he was a colonel of the 8th Missouri Cavalry Regiment. He was mustered from service in 1865. Following the war, he practiced law.

Gravely served in the United States House of Representatives from March 4, 1867, to March 3, 1869, representing Missouri's 4th district. During his tenure, he helped pass several railroad constructions bills. He was an alternate delegate to the 1868 Republican National Convention. From 1871, until his death April 28, 1872, he served as lieutenant governor of Missouri.

== Personal life and death ==
On June 23, 1850, Gravely married Martha Jane Marshall. Their daughter, Minnie Lee Gravely, married judge Cornelius Hite Skinker. Gravely died on April 28, 1872, aged 43, in Stockton, Missouri. He was buried at Lindley Prairie Cemetery, near Bearcreek.

U.S. House of Representatives
Preceded by John R. Kelso	Member of the U.S. House of Representatives from Missouri's 4th congressional district March 4, 1867 – March 3, 1869	Succeeded by Sempronius H. Boyd
Political offices
Preceded by Edwin O. Stanard	Lieutenant Governor of Missouri; 1871–1872	Succeeded by Charles Phillip Johnson
