= 1893 =

1893 in various calendars
- Gregorian calendar: 1893; MDCCCXCIII
- Ab urbe condita: 2646
- Armenian calendar: 1342; ԹՎ ՌՅԽԲ
- Assyrian calendar: 6643
- Baháʼí calendar: 49–50
- Balinese saka calendar: 1814–1815
- Bengali calendar: 1299–1300
- Berber calendar: 2843
- British Regnal year: 56 Vict. 1 – 57 Vict. 1
- Buddhist calendar: 2437
- Burmese calendar: 1255
- Byzantine calendar: 7401–7402
- Chinese calendar: 壬辰年 (Water Dragon); 4590 or 4383 — to — 癸巳年 (Water Snake); 4591 or 4384
- Coptic calendar: 1609–1610
- Discordian calendar: 3059
- Ethiopian calendar: 1885–1886
- Hebrew calendar: 5653–5654
- Hindu calendars
- Vikram Samvat: 1949–1950
- Shaka Samvat: 1814–1815
- Kali Yuga: 4993–4994
- Holocene calendar: 11893
- Igbo calendar: 893–894
- Iranian calendar: 1271–1272
- Islamic calendar: 1310–1311
- Japanese calendar: Meiji 26 (明治２６年)
- Javanese calendar: 1822–1823
- Julian calendar: Gregorian minus 12 days
- Korean calendar: 4226
- Minguo calendar: 19 before ROC 民前19年
- Nanakshahi calendar: 425
- Thai solar calendar: 2435–2436
- Tibetan calendar: ཆུ་ཕོ་འབྲུག་ལོ་ (male Water-Dragon); 2019 or 1638 or 866 — to — ཆུ་མོ་སྦྲུལ་ལོ་ (female Water-Snake); 2020 or 1639 or 867

1893 (MDCCCXCIII) was a common year starting on Sunday of the Gregorian calendar and a common year starting on Friday of the Julian calendar, the 1893rd year of the Common Era (CE) and Anno Domini (AD) designations, the 893rd year of the 2nd millennium, the 93rd year of the 19th century, and the 4th year of the 1890s decade. As of the start of 1893, the Gregorian calendar was 12 days ahead of the Julian calendar, which remained in localized use until 1923.

== Events ==
=== January ===
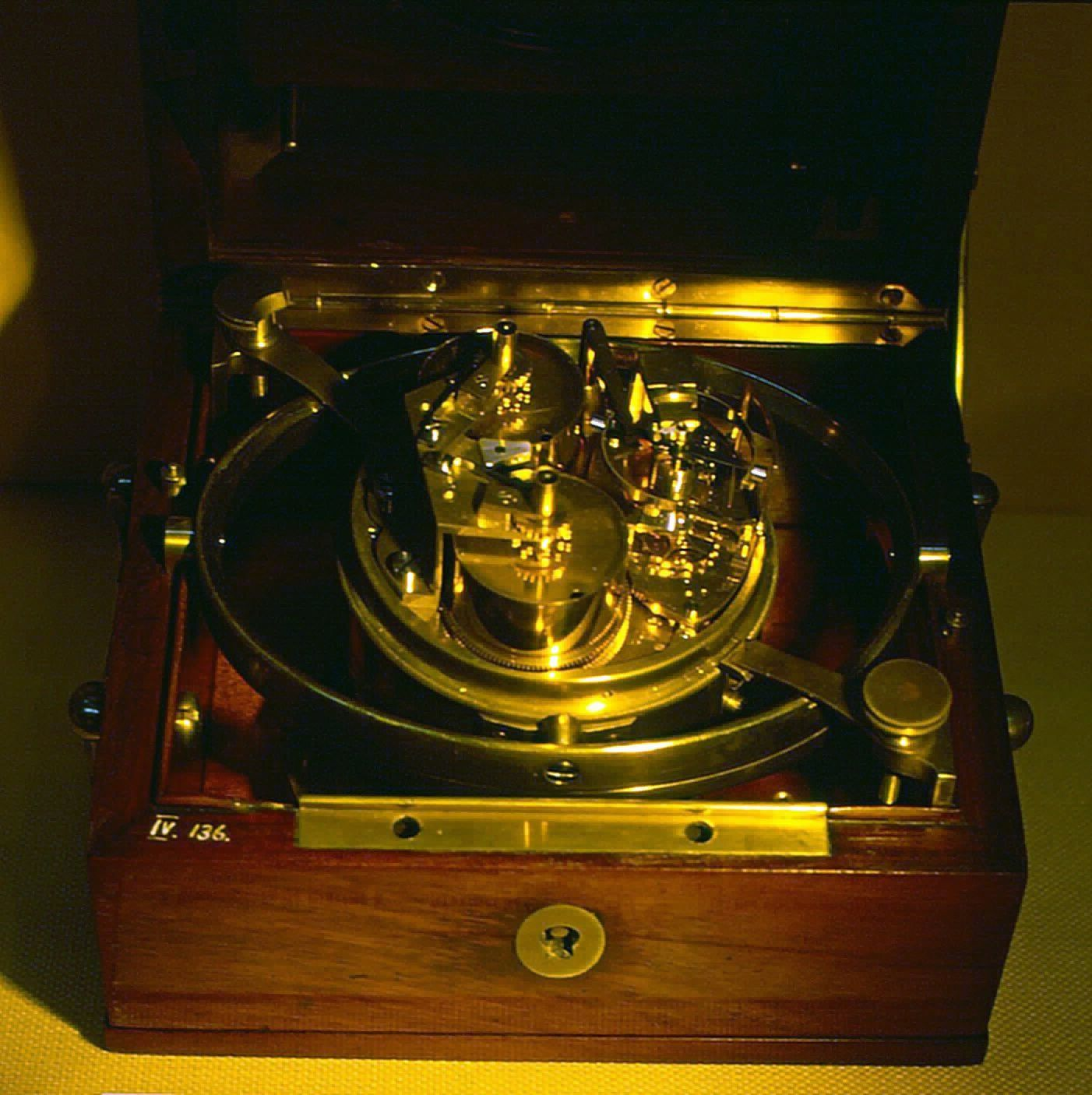
January 2: standard railroad chronometers.

- January 2 – Webb C. Ball introduces railroad chronometers, which become the general railroad timepiece standards in North America.
- January 6 – The Washington National Cathedral is chartered by Congress; the charter is signed by President Benjamin Harrison.
- January 13
  - The Independent Labour Party of the United Kingdom has its first meeting.
  - U.S. Marines from the USS Boston land in Honolulu, Hawaii, to prevent the queen from abrogating the Bayonet Constitution.
- January 15 – The Telefon Hírmondó service starts with around 60 subscribers, in Budapest.
- January 17 – Overthrow of the Kingdom of Hawaii: Lorrin A. Thurston and the Citizen's Committee of Public Safety in Hawaii, with the intervention of the United States Marine Corps, overthrow the government of Queen Liliuokalani.
- January 21 – The Tati Concessions Land, formerly part of Matabeleland, is formally annexed to the Bechuanaland Protectorate (modern-day Botswana).

=== February ===
- February 1 – Thomas Edison finishes construction of the first motion picture studio in West Orange, New Jersey.
- February 11–19 – White Star Line cargo liner SS Naronic sinks without a trace in heavy seas on the Liverpool–New York transatlantic passage.
- February 23 – Rudolf Diesel receives a patent for the diesel engine.
- February 24 – The American University is established by an Act of Congress, in Washington, D.C.
- February 28 – USS Indiana, the first battleship in the United States Navy comparable to other nation's battleships of the time, is launched.

=== March ===
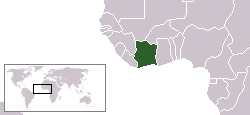
March 10: Ivory Coast becomes French colony.

- March 6 – The Liverpool Overhead Railway opens with 2-car electric multiple units, the first to operate in the world.
- March 10 – Ivory Coast becomes a French colony.
- March 20 – In Belgium, Adam Worth is sentenced to 7 years for robbery (he is released in 1897).

=== April ===
- April 1 – The rank of Chief Petty Officer is established in the United States Navy.
- April 6 – The iconic Salt Lake Temple of the Church of Jesus Christ of Latter-day Saints is dedicated, after 40 years of construction.
- April 8 – The first recorded college basketball game occurs in Beaver Falls, Pennsylvania, between the Geneva College Covenanters and the New Brighton YMCA.
- April 17
  - Belgian general strike of 1893: Riots erupt in Mons; the day after, the Belgian Parliament approves universal male suffrage.
  - The Alpha Xi Delta Sorority is founded at Lombard College in Galesburg, Illinois.

=== May ===
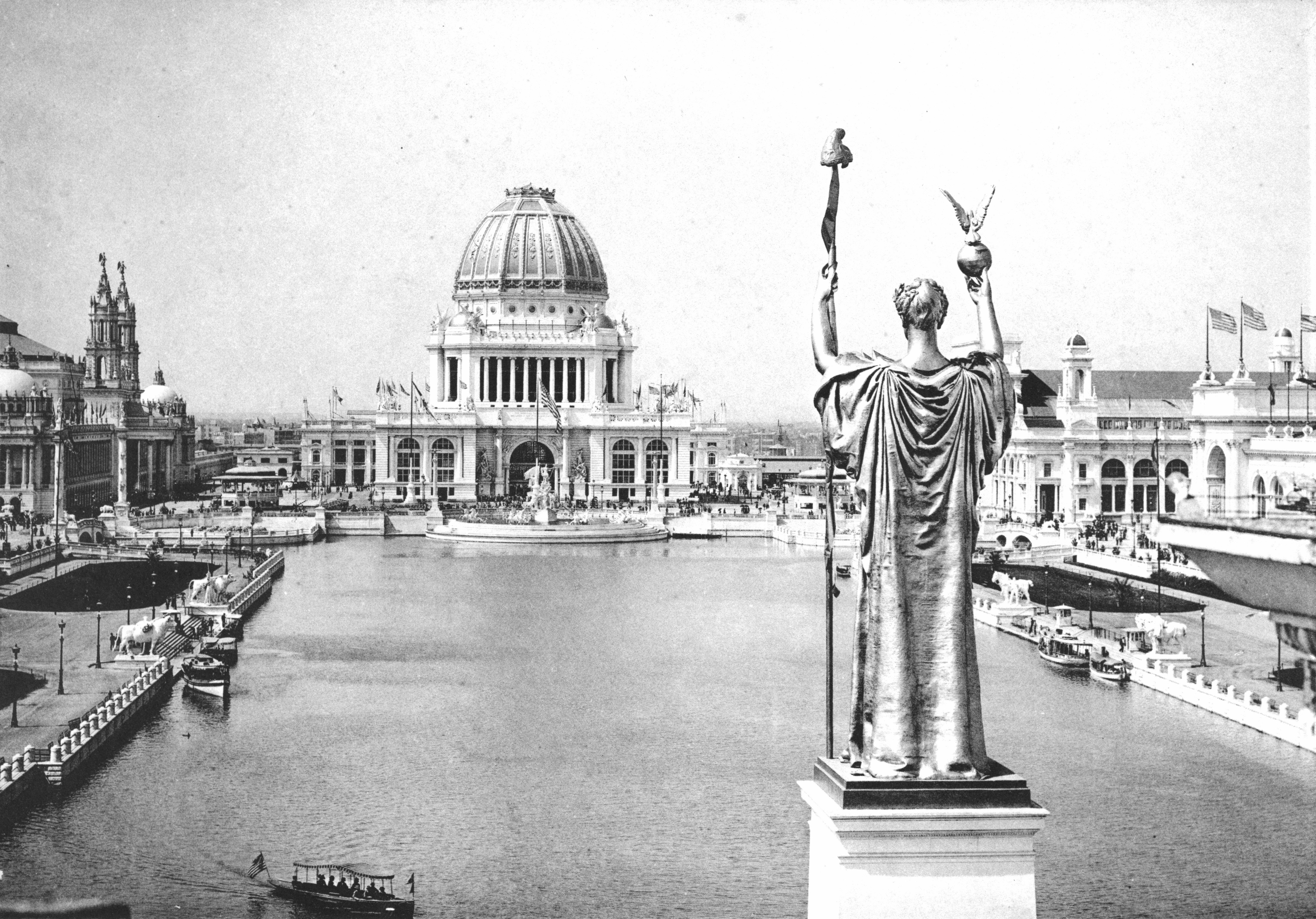
May 1: World's Columbian Exposition, Chicago

- May 1 – The 1893 World's Fair, also known as the World's Columbian Exposition, opens to the public in Chicago, Illinois. The first United States commemorative postage stamps are issued for the event.
- May 5 – Panic of 1893: A crash on the New York Stock Exchange starts a depression.
- May 9 – Edison's 1½ inch system of Kinetoscope is first demonstrated in public, at the Brooklyn Institute.
- May 23 – Gandhi arrives in South Africa, where he will live until 1914, lead non-violent protests on behalf of Indian immigrants in the South African Republic (Transvaal), and develop a deeper experience of such activities.
- June 4 – The Anti-Saloon League is incorporated, originally as a state organization, in Oberlin, Ohio. On December 18, 1895, it becomes a nationwide organization. The same year, the American Council on Alcohol Problems is established, along with the Committee of Fifty for the Study of the Liquor Problem.
- May – The Free Presbyterian Church of Scotland is formed.

=== June ===
- June 15 – 1893 German federal election: Small anti-Semitic parties secure 2.9% of the vote.
- June 17 – Gold is found in Kalgoorlie, Western Australia.

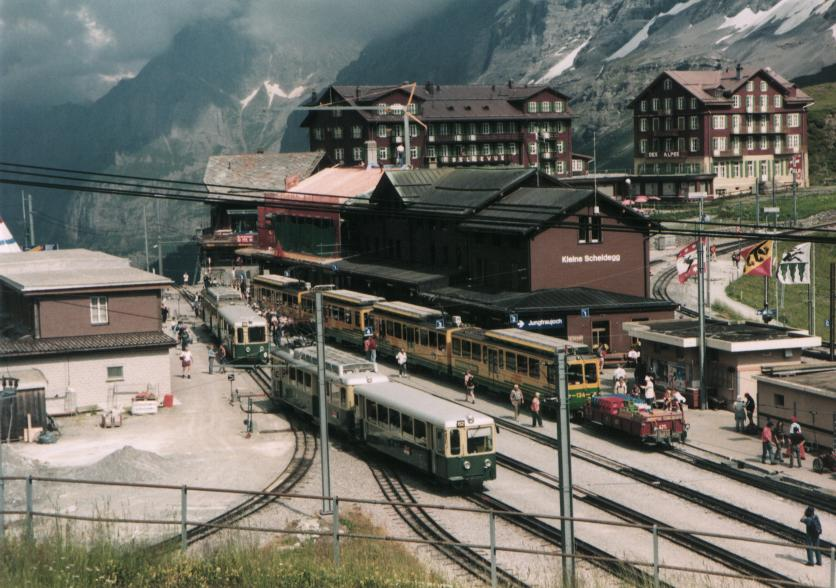
June 20: Wengernalpbahn railway.

- June 20
  - The Wengernalpbahn railway in Wengen, Switzerland (Canton of Bern) is opened.
  - Lizzie Borden is acquitted of the axe murder of her parents in Fall River, Massachusetts in 1892.

June 22: British Mediterranean Fleet flagship Victoria sinks.

- June 22 – The flagship HMS Victoria (1887) of the British Mediterranean Fleet collides with HMS Camperdown (1885) and sinks in 10 minutes; Vice-admiral Sir George Tryon goes down with his ship.
- June 29 – Unveiling of the Shaftesbury Memorial Fountain at Piccadilly Circus in London with its statue of Anteros.

=== July ===
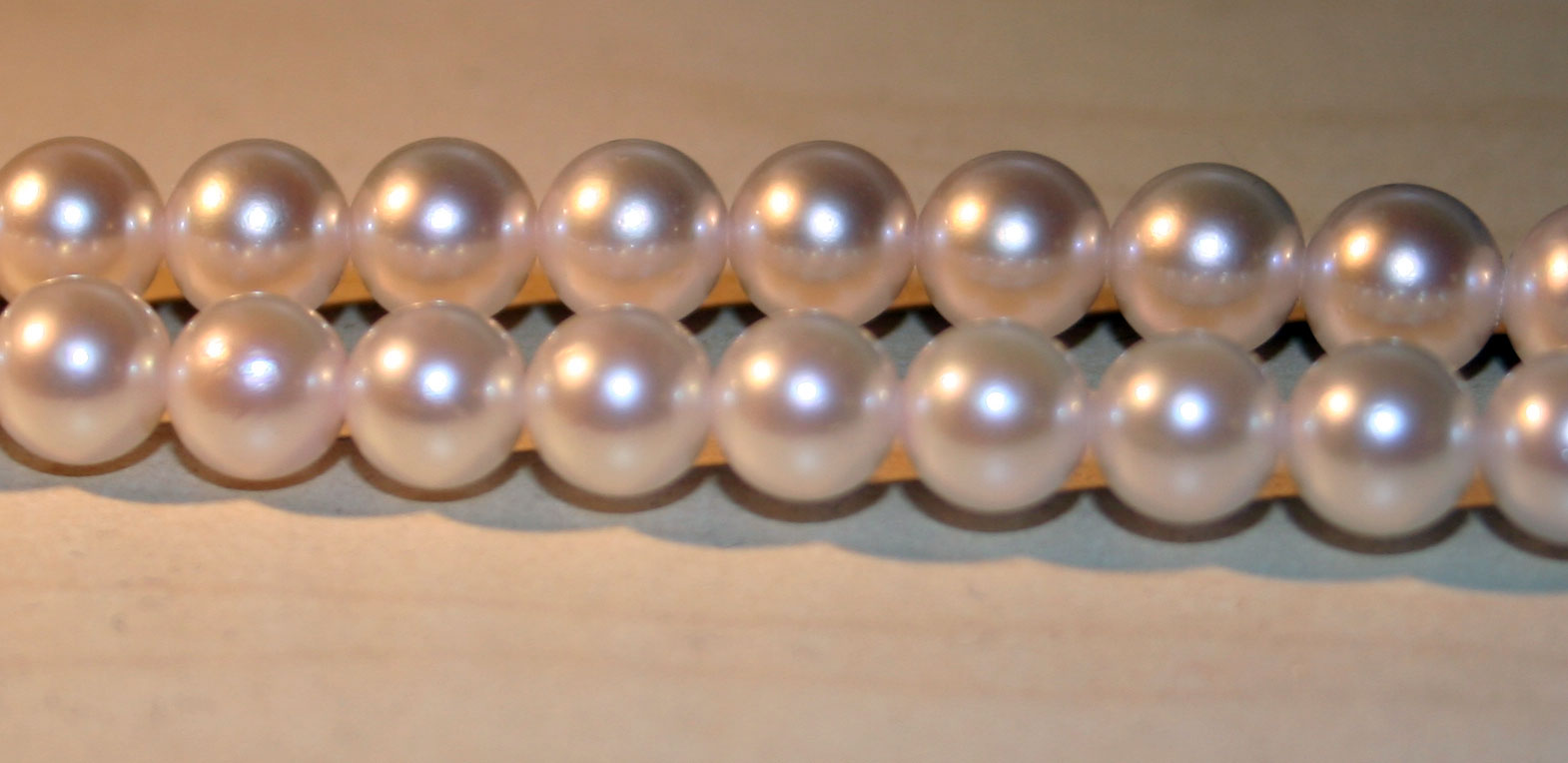
July 11: Mikimoto develops cultured pearls.

- July 1 – U.S. President Grover Cleveland is operated on in secret.
- June 6
  - Wedding of Prince George, Duke of York, and Princess Mary of Teck: the future King George V of the United Kingdom marries at St James's Palace in London.
  - The small town of Pomeroy, Iowa, is nearly destroyed by a tornado; 71 people are killed and 200 injured.
- July 11
  - Liberal general and politician José Santos Zelaya leads a successful revolt in Nicaragua.
  - Kōkichi Mikimoto, in Japan, develops the method to seed and grow cultured pearls.
- July 13
  - Paknam Incident: Two French Navy ships are fired upon by Siamese cannons stationed at the Paknam Fort, that guards the Chao Phraya River. Three months later, Siam is forced to cede modern-day Laos to France.
  - Frederick Jackson Turner gives a lecture titled "The Significance of the Frontier in American History" before the American Historical Association in Chicago.
  - Scottish Association football club Dundee F.C. is formed.

=== August ===
- 6 August – The Corinth Canal is completed in Greece.
- August 14 – The world's first driving licenses are introduced in France under the Paris Police Ordinance.
- August 15 – The Ibadan area becomes a British protectorate, after a treaty signed by Fijabi, the Baale of Ibadan, with the British acting Governor of Lagos, George C. Denton.
- August 27 – The Sea Islands hurricane hits Savannah, Georgia, Charleston, South Carolina, and the Sea Islands, killing 1,000–2,000.

=== September ===
- September 1 – William Ewart Gladstone's Government of Ireland Bill 1893, intended to give Ireland self-government, is rejected by the U.K. Parliament.
- September 7
  - Under pressure of a general strike, the Belgian Federal Parliament enacts general multiple suffrage.
  - Russian monitor Rusalka sinks in a storm in the Gulf of Finland, with the loss of all 177 crew; her hulk is eventually discovered in 2003 off Helsinki.
  - Genoa Cricket & Athletic Club, the oldest Italian Association football club, is formed.
- September 11 – The World Parliament of Religions opens as an adjunct to the World's Columbian Exposition in Chicago; Bengali Hindu monk Swami Vivekananda receives a standing ovation for his address in response to his welcoming.
- September 12 – American Temperance University begins classes in Harriman, Tennessee (it closes after 15 years, in May 1908).
- September 16 – Settlers make a land run for prime land in the Cherokee Strip in Oklahoma.
- September 19
  - New Zealand becomes the first country in the world to grant women's suffrage.
  - Swami Vivekananda delivers an inspiring paper at the World Parliament of Religions in Chicago.
- September 21 – Brothers Charles and Frank Duryea drive the first gasoline-powered motorcar in America, on public roads in Springfield, Massachusetts.
- September 23 – The Baháʼí Faith is first publicly mentioned in the United States, at the World Parliament of Religions in Chicago.
- September 27 – The World Parliament of Religions holds its closing meeting in Chicago.
- September 28 – The Portuguese sports club Futebol Clube do Porto is founded.

=== October ===
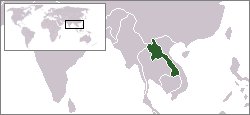
France conquers Laos.

- October 10 – The first car number plates appear in Paris, France.
- October 13
  - The first students enter St Hilda's College, Oxford, England, founded for women by Dorothea Beale.
  - The Franco-Siamese Treaty of 1893 is signed, as the Kingdom of Siam cedes all of its territories east of the Mekong River to France, creating the territory of Laos.
- October 14 – A devastating levee collapse, flash flood and landslide hit and damage around Kyushu Island, Shikoku Island and western Honshū in Japan, due to a strong typhoon wind; an official document reports that 2,044 people perish.
- October 16 – American sisters Patty Hill and Mildred J. Hill copyright their book Song Stories for the Kindergarten including "Good Morning to All". The melody, by Mildred Hill, is later adapted, without authorization, by Robert H. Coleman as "Good Morning to You!", with the second stanza containing the words to "Happy Birthday to You", leading to a successful copyright lawsuit by the Hill sisters in 1934.
- October 23 – The Internal Macedonian Revolutionary Organization (IMRO) is founded in the town of Thessaloniki. Its aim is to liberate the region of Macedonia from the Ottoman Turks.
- October 28 (October 16 O.S.) – In Saint Petersburg (Russia), Pyotr Ilyich Tchaikovsky conducts the first performance of his Symphony No. 6 in B minor, Pathétique, nine days before his death.
- October 30 – The 1893 World's Fair, also known as the World's Columbian Exposition, closes.

=== November ===
- November 1 – First Matabele War: Battle of Bembezi, British South Africa Company defeats an assault by the Matabele.
- November 7 – Colorado women are granted the right to vote.
- November 12 – The Durand Line is established as the boundary between British India and Afghanistan, by a memorandum of understanding signed by Sir Mortimer Durand, Foreign Secretary of British India, and Abdur Rahman Khan, Amir of Afghanistan.
- November 15 – FC Basel Association football club is founded in Switzerland.
- November 16 – Athletic club Královské Vinohrady, later Sparta Prague, is founded.
- November 26 – Arthur Conan Doyle's story "The Adventure of the Final Problem", published in the December dated issue of The Strand Magazine and serialized in Sunday newspapers worldwide, surprises the reading public by revealing that his popular character Sherlock Holmes had apparently died at the Reichenbach Falls on May 4, 1891.

=== December ===
- December 4 – First Matabele War: The Shangani Patrol of British South Africa Company soldiers is ambushed and annihilated, by more than 3,000 Matabele warriors.
- December 5 – Plural voting is abolished in New South Wales.
- December 16 – Antonín Dvořák's Symphony No. 9 (From the New World) receives its premiere at Carnegie Hall, New York City, conducted by the composer, to immediate acclaim.
- December 20 – Evergreen Park, Illinois, is incorporated.
- December
  - Mark Twain's Pudd'nhead Wilson begins serialization in The Century Magazine (U.S.)
  - Carl Anton Larsen becomes the first man to ski in Antarctica.

=== Date unknown ===
Pepsi invented

- The first recumbent bicycle, the Fautenil Vélociped, is made in France.
- Sudbury, Ontario, Canada, is incorporated as a town.
- German physicist Wilhelm Wien formulates Wien's displacement law.
- TMI Episcopal is founded in San Antonio as "The West Texas School for Boys", quickly changed to "West Texas Military Academy", by Bishop James S. Johnston.
- Booker T. Washington High School (Houston) is founded as "Colored High", the first African-American high school in Houston, Texas.
- A 16th century Ardabil Carpet from Persia enters the collection of the South Kensington Museum in London.
- American pharmacist Caleb Bradham invents the recipe for what later becomes Pepsi. He originally sells it as 'Brad's Drink' at his pharmacy in New Bern, North Carolina.
- The Girls' Brigade is founded in Dublin, Ireland, origin of the international Christian youth organisation.
- By 1893 – 8,000 Chinese have arrived in Cuba.

== Births ==
=== January–March ===
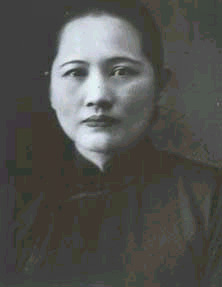
Soong Ching-ling

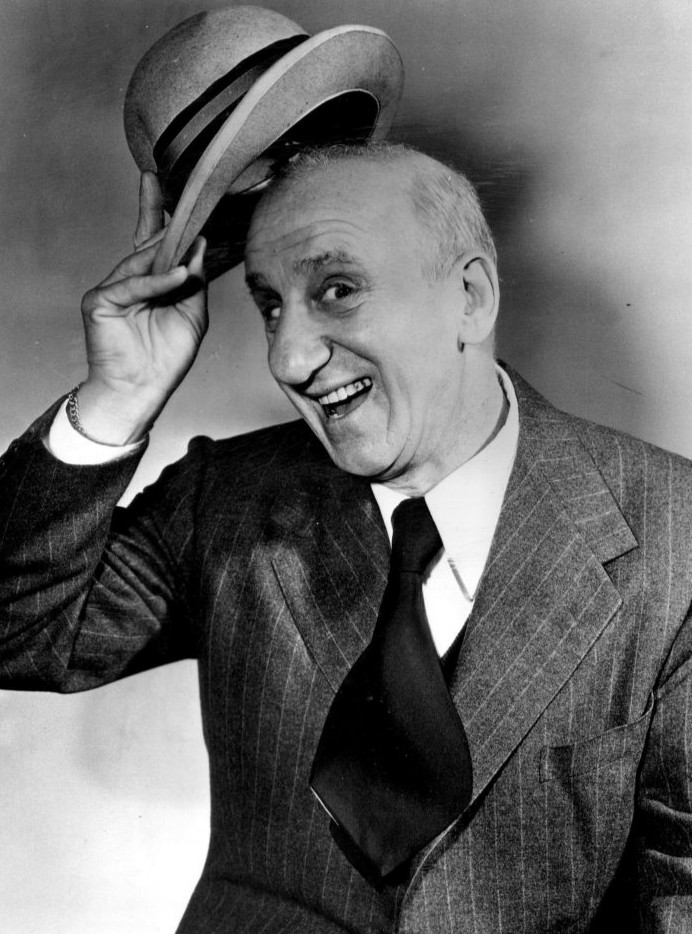
Jimmy Durante

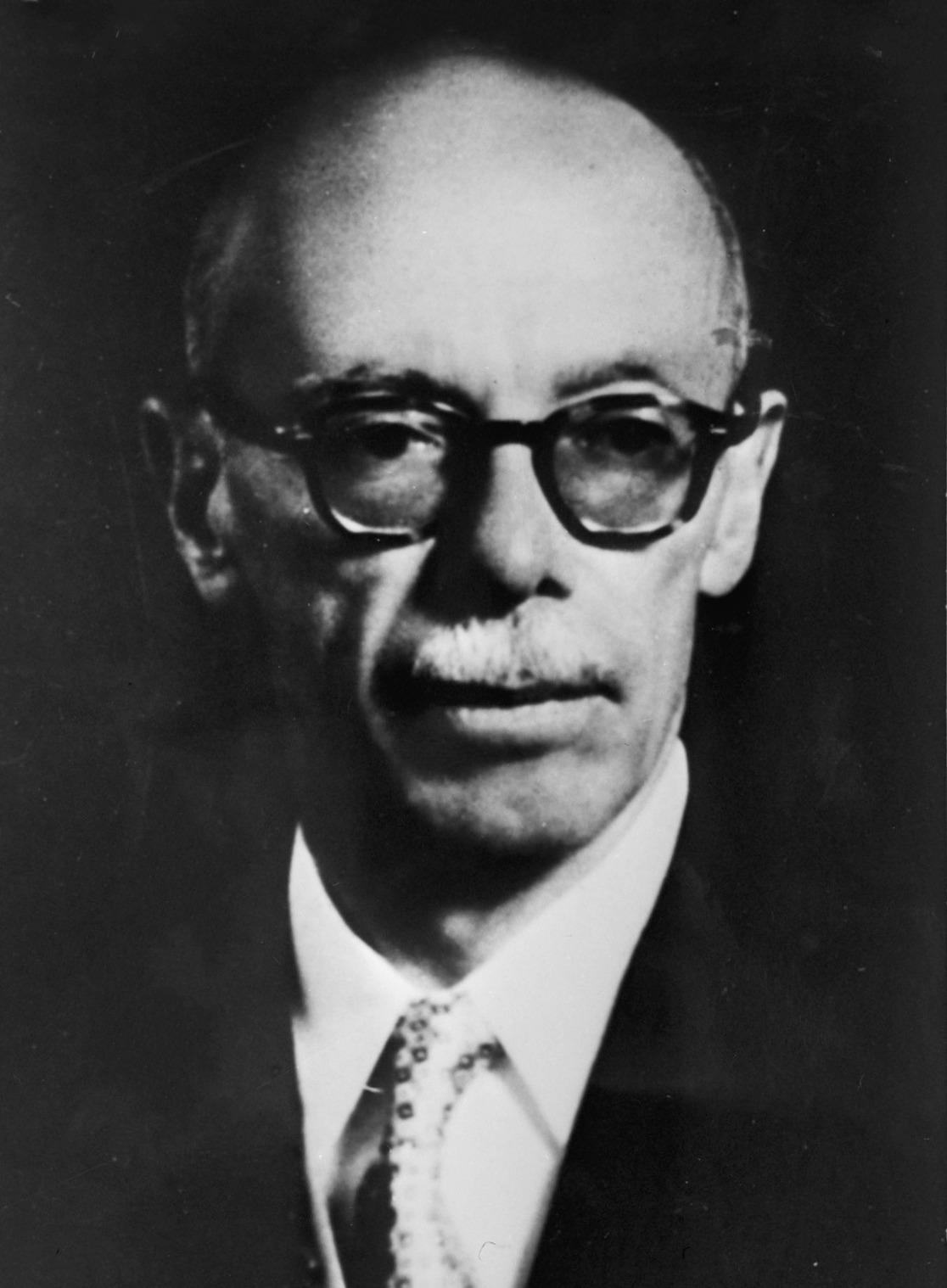
José María Velasco Ibarra

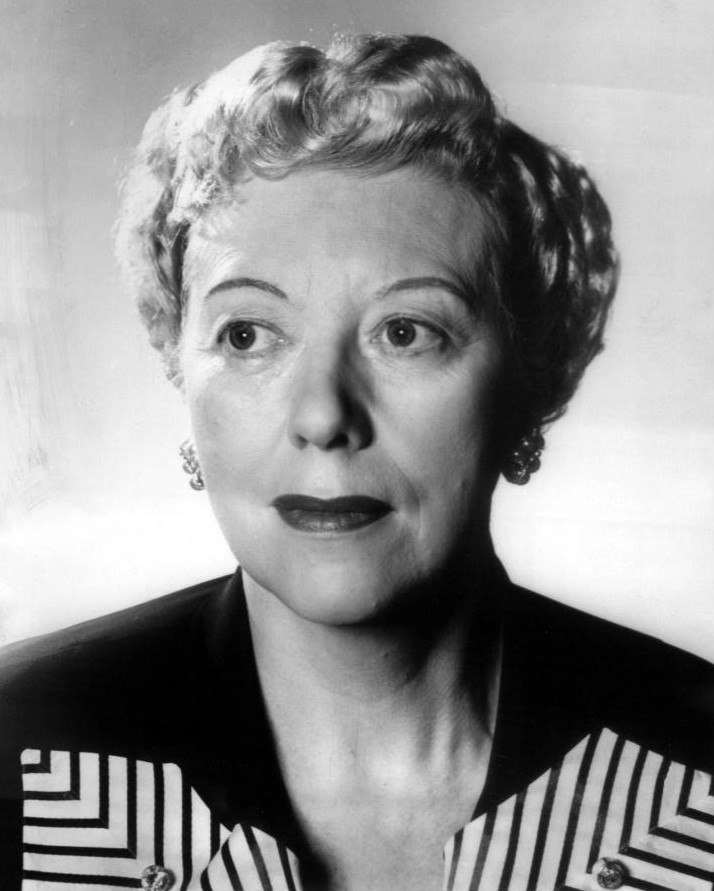
Ethel Owen

- January 1 – Minoru Sasaki, Japanese general (d. 1961)
- January 5 – Paramahansa Yogananda, Indian guru (d. 1952)
- January 10 – Vicente Huidobro, Chilean poet (d. 1948)
- January 12
  - Hermann Göring, German Nazi official (suicide 1946)
  - Alfred Rosenberg, German Nazi official (executed 1946)
- January 13 – Roy Cazaly, Australian rules footballer (d. 1963)
- January 15 – Ivor Novello, Welsh actor, musician (d. 1951)
- January 22
  - Ilya Denisov, Russian Greek-Catholic priest (d. 1971)
  - Conrad Veidt, German actor (d. 1943)
  - Frankie Yale, American gangster (k. 1928)
- January 27 – Soong Ching-ling, one of the Soong sisters, wife of Chinese president Sun Yat-sen (d. 1981)
- January 28 – Catherine Caradja, Romanian aristocrat, philanthropist (d. 1993)
- February 3 – Gaston Julia, French mathematician (d. 1978)
- February 9 – Georgios Athanasiadis-Novas, Prime Minister of Greece (d. 1987)
- February 10
  - Jimmy Durante, American actor, singer and comedian (d. 1980)
  - Bill Tilden, American tennis player (d. 1953)
- February 12 – Omar Bradley, American general (d. 1981)
- February 13 – Ana Pauker, Romanian communist politician (d. 1960)
- February 16
  - Katharine Cornell, American actress (d. 1974)
  - Mikhail Tukhachevsky, Soviet Army officer (executed 1937)
- February 19 – Sir Cedric Hardwicke, English actor (d. 1964)
- February 21 – Andrés Segovia, Spanish guitarist (d. 1987)
- March 3 – Beatrice Wood, American artist, ceramicist (d. 1998)
- March 5 – Kōtoku Satō, Japanese general (d. 1959)
- March 8 – Mississippi John Hurt, American country blues singer, guitarist (d. 1966) (some sources give his year of birth as 1892)
- March 11 – Wanda Gág, American children's author and artist (d. 1946)
- March 18 – Wilfred Owen, English soldier, poet (killed in action 1918)
- March 19 – José María Velasco Ibarra, 24th President of Ecuador (d. 1979)
- March 24
  - Walter Baade, German astronomer (d. 1960)
  - Emmy Sonnemann, German actress, second wife of Hermann Göring (d. 1973)
  - Jessie Sanders, American politician and ranch operator (d. 1985)
- March 26 – Palmiro Togliatti, Italian communist leader (d. 1964)
- March 27 – Karl Mannheim, German sociologist (d. 1947)
- March 30 – Ethel Owen, American actress (d. 1997)

=== April–June ===
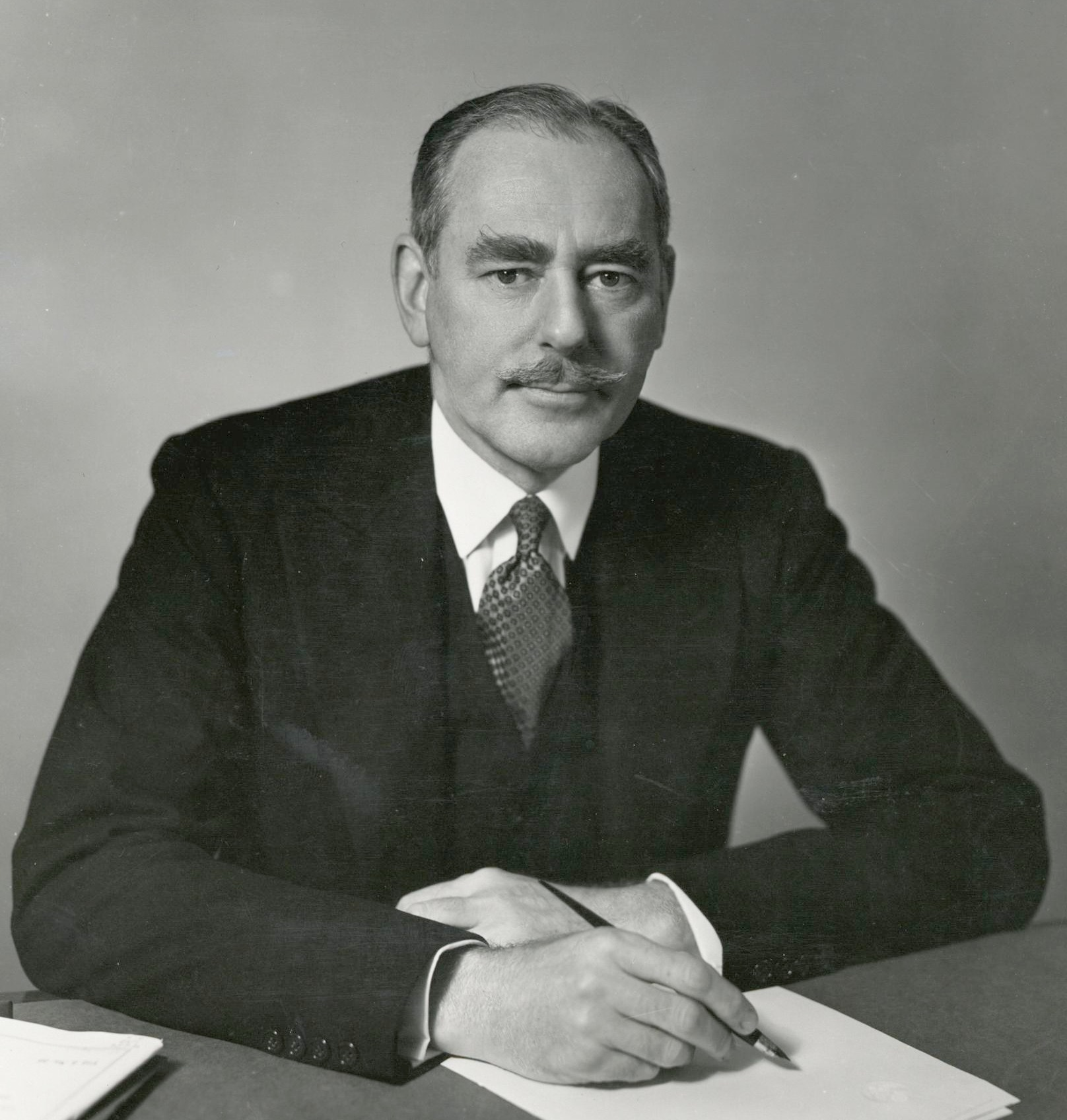
Dean Acheson

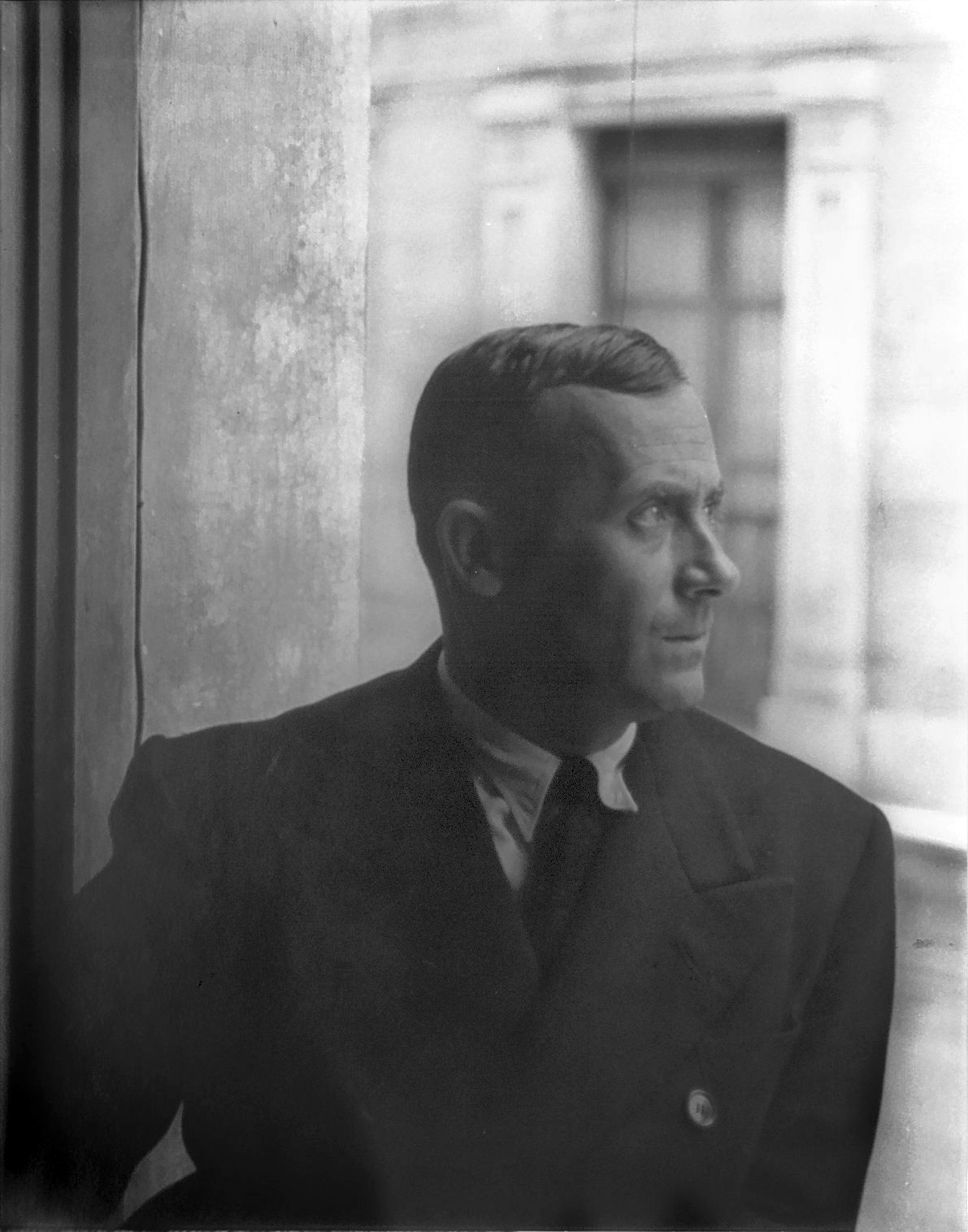
Joan Miró

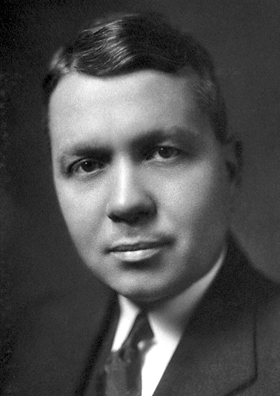
Harold Urey

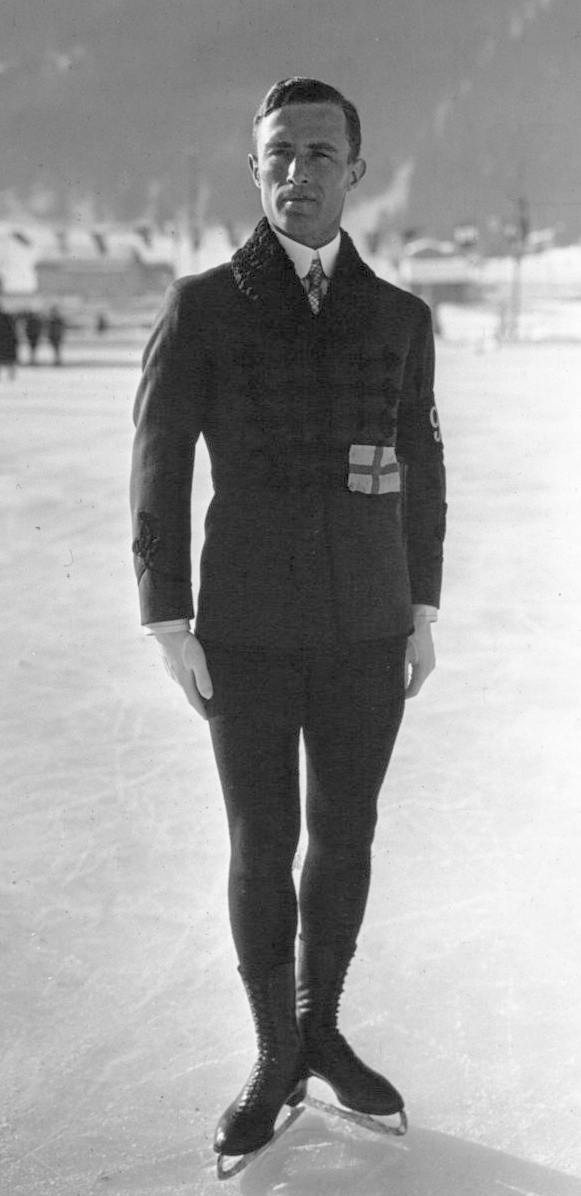
Gillis Grafström

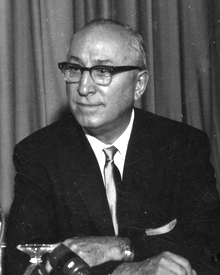
Roy O. Disney

- April 1 – Cicely Courtneidge, British actress (d. 1980)
- April 3 – Leslie Howard, English actor (d. 1943)
- April 5 – Irena Káňová, Slovak politician (d. 1963)
- April 9
  - Victor Gollancz, British publisher (d. 1967)
  - Rahul Sankrityayan, Indian historian, writer, scholar (d. 1963)
- April 11 – Dean Acheson, 51st United States Secretary of State (d. 1971)
- April 12 – Robert Harron, American actor (d. 1920)
- April 20
  - Harold Lloyd, American actor (d. 1971)
  - Joan Miró, Spanish painter, sculptor (d. 1983)
  - Edna Parker, American supercentenarian (d. 2008)
- April 23 – Allen Dulles, American Central Intelligence Agency director (d. 1969)
- April 29 – Harold Urey, American chemist, Nobel Prize laureate (d. 1981)
- May 1 – Nestor Lakoba, Abkhaz communist leader (d. 1936)
- May 3 – Konstantine Gamsakhurdia, Georgian writer, public benefactor (d. 1975)
- May 8 – Francis Ouimet, American golfer, businessman (d. 1967)
- May 16 – Clement Martyn Doke, South African linguist (d. 1980)
- May 25 – Ernest Stoneman, American country music artist (d. 1968)
- June 4 – Armand Călinescu, 39th Prime Minister of Romania (d. 1939)
- June 7 – Gillis Grafström, Swedish figure skater (d. 1938)
- June 10 – Hattie McDaniel, actress, first African-American woman to win an Academy Award (d. 1952)
- June 12 – John R. Hodge, United States Army general (d. 1963)
- June 13 – Dorothy L. Sayers, British crime writer, poet, playwright and essayist (d. 1957)
- June 23 – Herman H. Hanneken, United States Marine Corps officer (d. 1986)
- June 24
  - Roy O. Disney, brother, business partner of Walter Elias Disney (d. 1971)
  - Suzanne La Follette, American libertarian feminist (d. 1983)
- June 26 – Big Bill Broonzy, American blues singer, composer (d. 1958) (some sources give his year of birth as 1903)
- June 29 – Aarre Merikanto, Finnish composer (d. 1958)
- June 30
  - Harold Laski, British political theorist, economist (d. 1950)
  - Walter Ulbricht, German communist politician (d. 1973)

=== July–September ===
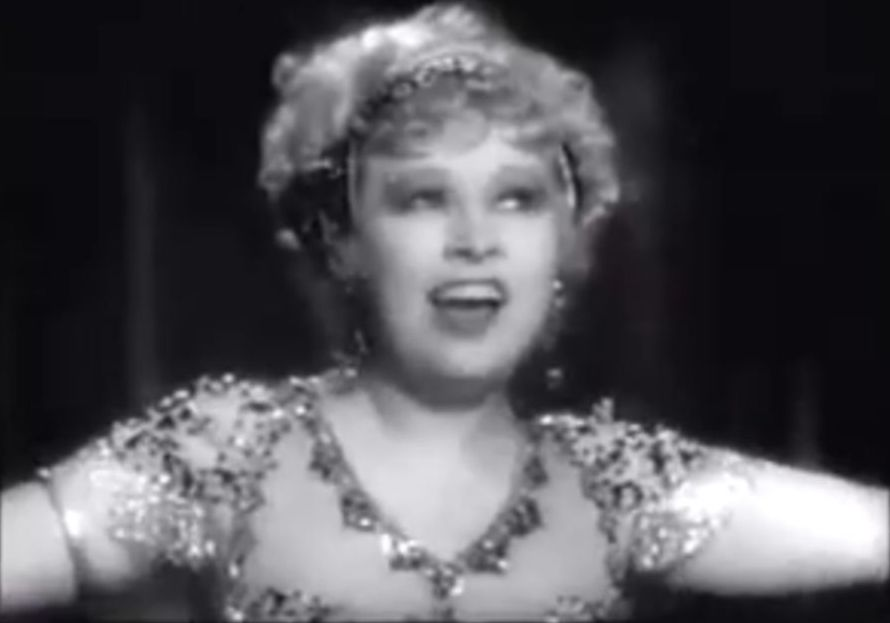
Mae West

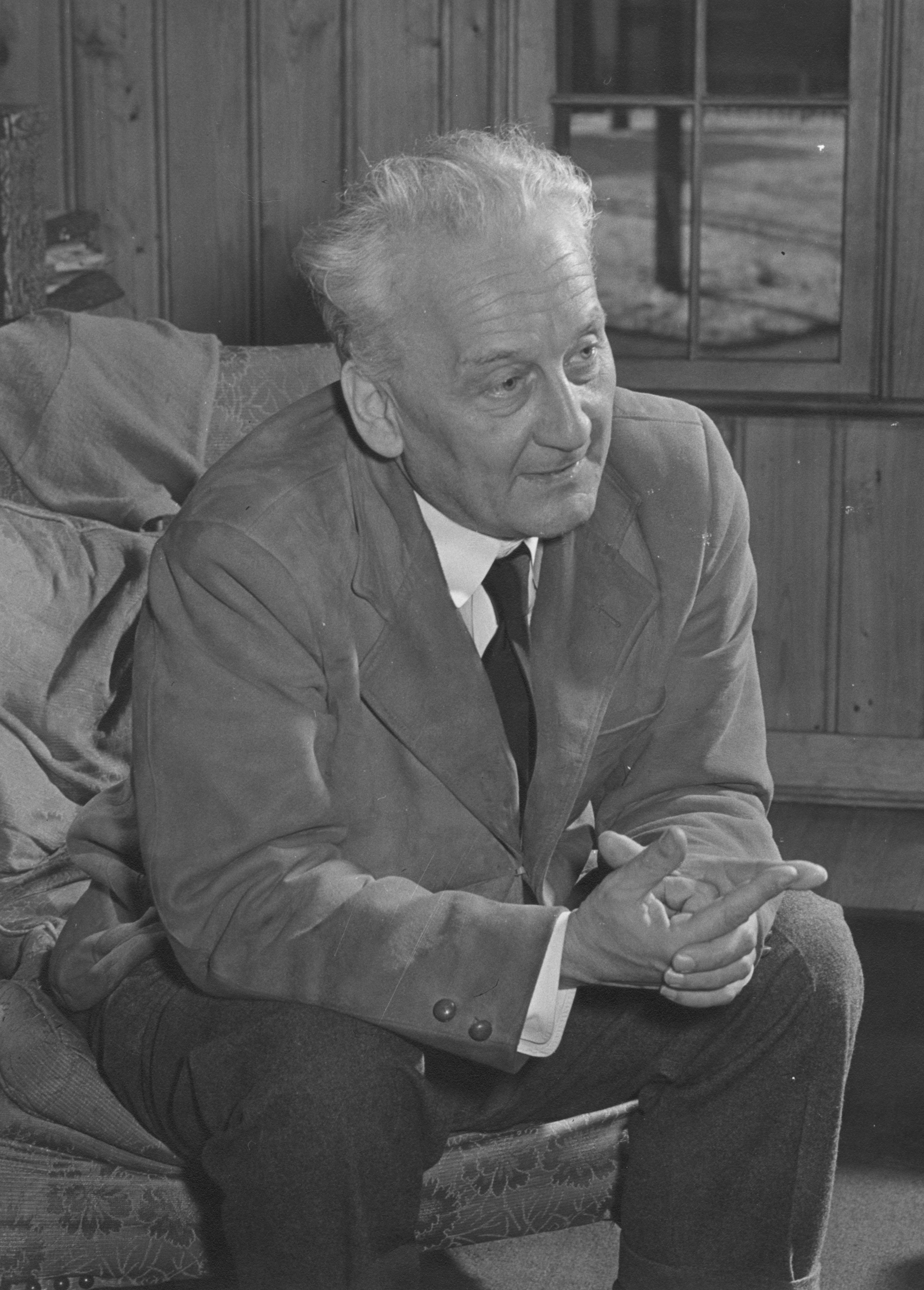
Albert Szent-Györgyi

- July 1 – Mario de Bernardi, Italian aviator (d. 1959)
- July 4 – Norman Manley, Jamaican statesman (d. 1969)
- July 9
  - George Geary, English cricketer (d. 1981)
  - Dorothy Thompson, American journalist and radio commentator (d. 1961)
- July 11 – Edward Stinson, American aviator, aircraft manufacturer (d. 1932)
- July 12 – Ernest Cadine, French weightlifter (d. 1978)
- July 18 – Richard Dix, American actor (d. 1949)
- July 20
  - Arno von Lenski, German military officer, general (d. 1986)
  - George Llewelyn Davies, British inspiration for Peter Pan (killed in action 1915)
- July 22 – Karl Menninger, American psychiatrist (d. 1990)
- July 28 – Rued Langgaard, Danish composer, organist (d. 1952)
- July 30 – Fatima Jinnah, Pakistani Mother of the Nation (d. 1967)
- August 4 – Fritz Gause, German historian (d. 1973)
- August 6 – Wright Patman, American politician (d. 1976)
- August 14
  - Francis Dvornik, Czech historian (d. 1975)
  - Samuel Leibowitz, Romanian-born American criminal defense attorney and justice (d. 1978)
- August 15 – Leslie Comrie, New Zealand astronomer, computing pioneer (d. 1950)
- August 17 – Mae West, American actress, playwright, screenwriter and sex symbol (d. 1980)
- August 18 – Frank Linke-Crawford, Austro-Hungarian fighter pilot (killed in action 1918)
- August 22 – Dorothy Parker, American writer (d. 1967)
- August 23 – Aleksandr Loktionov, Soviet general (d. 1941)
- August 25 – H. Trendley Dean, American dental researcher (d. 1962)
- August 28 – Val Imm, American politician and newspaper editor (d. 1981)
- August 30 – Huey Long, Louisiana governor and senator (assassinated 1935)
- September 6 – Claire Lee Chennault, American aviator, general and leader of the Flying Tigers (d. 1958)
- September 10 – Johanna Bormann, German Nazi concentration camp guard (executed 1945)
- September 16 – Albert Szent-Györgyi, Hungarian physiologist, Nobel Prize laureate (d. 1986)
- September 18 – Arthur Benjamin, Australian composer (d. 1960)
- September 25 – Ryūnosuke Kusaka, Japanese admiral (d. 1971)

=== October–December ===
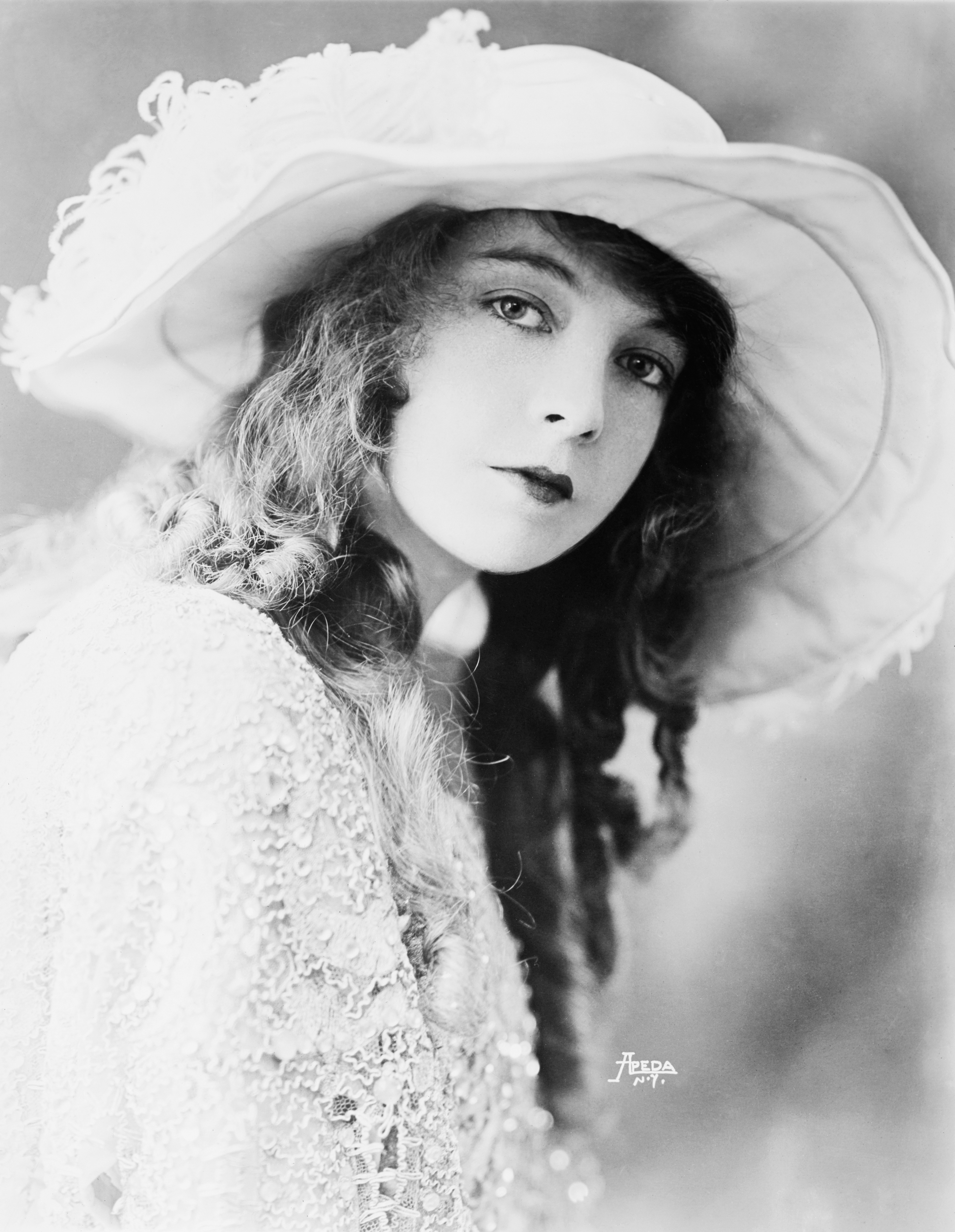
Lillian Gish

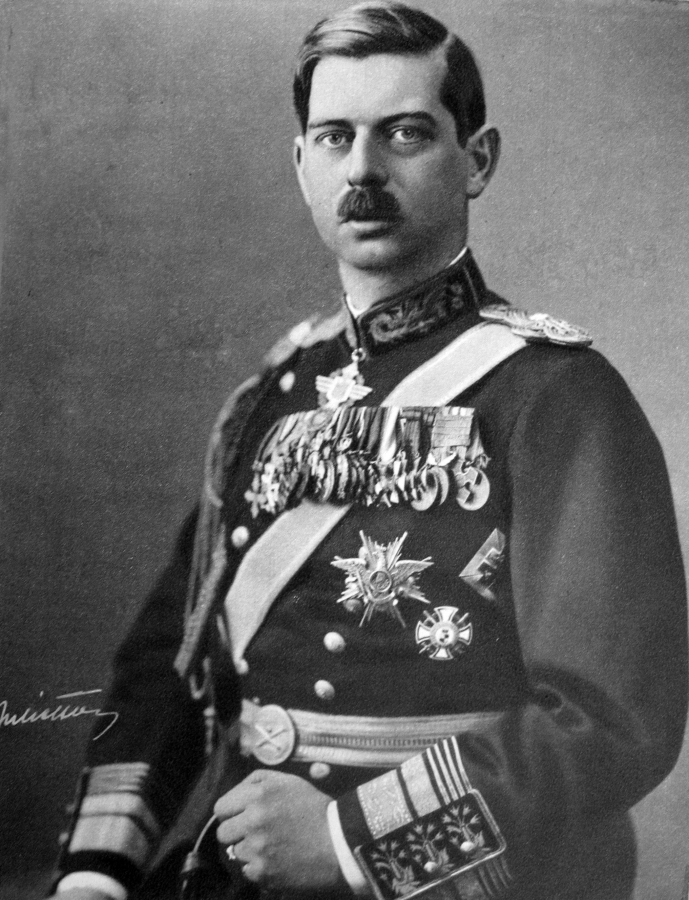
Carol II of Romania

- October 1 – Marianne Brandt, German industrial designer (d. 1983)
- October 8 – Clarence Williams, American jazz pianist and composer (d. 1965) (some sources give his year of birth as 1898)
- October 9 – Mário de Andrade, Brazilian writer, photographer (d. 1945)
- October 14 – Lillian Gish, American actress (d. 1993)
- October 15 – King Carol II of Romania (d. 1953)
- October 18
  - Sidney Holland, 25th Prime Minister of New Zealand (d. 1961)
  - George Ohsawa, Japanese founder of Macrobiotics (d. 1966)
- October 24 – Kurt Huber, German university professor, member of the White Rose resistance group in Nazi Germany (d. 1943)
- October 26 – Oliver P. Smith, American general (d. 1977)
- November 2 – Victor Crutchley, British admiral (d. 1986)
- November 5 – Raymond Loewy, French-born American industrial designer (d. 1986)
- November 8 – Prajadhipok, Rama VII, King of Siam (d. 1941)
- November 10 – John P. Marquand, American novelist (d. 1960)
- November 12 – Leonard F. Wing, American general, politician (d. 1945)
- November 13 – Edward Adelbert Doisy, American biochemist, recipient of the Nobel Prize in Physiology or Medicine (d. 1986)
- November 14 – Addie Viola Smith, American lawyer and trade commissioner (d. 1975)
- November 20 – Grace Darmond, Canadian-born American actress (d. 1963)
- November 22
  - Lazar Kaganovich, Soviet politician, Great Purge perpetrator (d. 1991)
  - Raymond Collishaw, Canadian World War I fighter ace (d. 1976)
- November 27 – Carlos Alberto Arroyo del Río, 26th President of Ecuador (d. 1969)
- December 1 – Henry Cadbury, American biblical scholar, Quaker (d. 1974)
- December 2 – Leo Ornstein, Russian-born American composer, pianist (d. 2002)
- December 7
  - Fay Bainter, American actress (d. 1968)
  - Hermann Balck, German general (d. 1982)
- December 12 – Edward G. Robinson, Romanian-American actor (d. 1973)
- December 23 – Ann Pennington, American actress, dancer (d. 1971)
- December 26 – Mao Zedong, Chinese communist leader, founder of the People’s Republic of China (d. 1976)

== Deaths ==
=== January–June ===
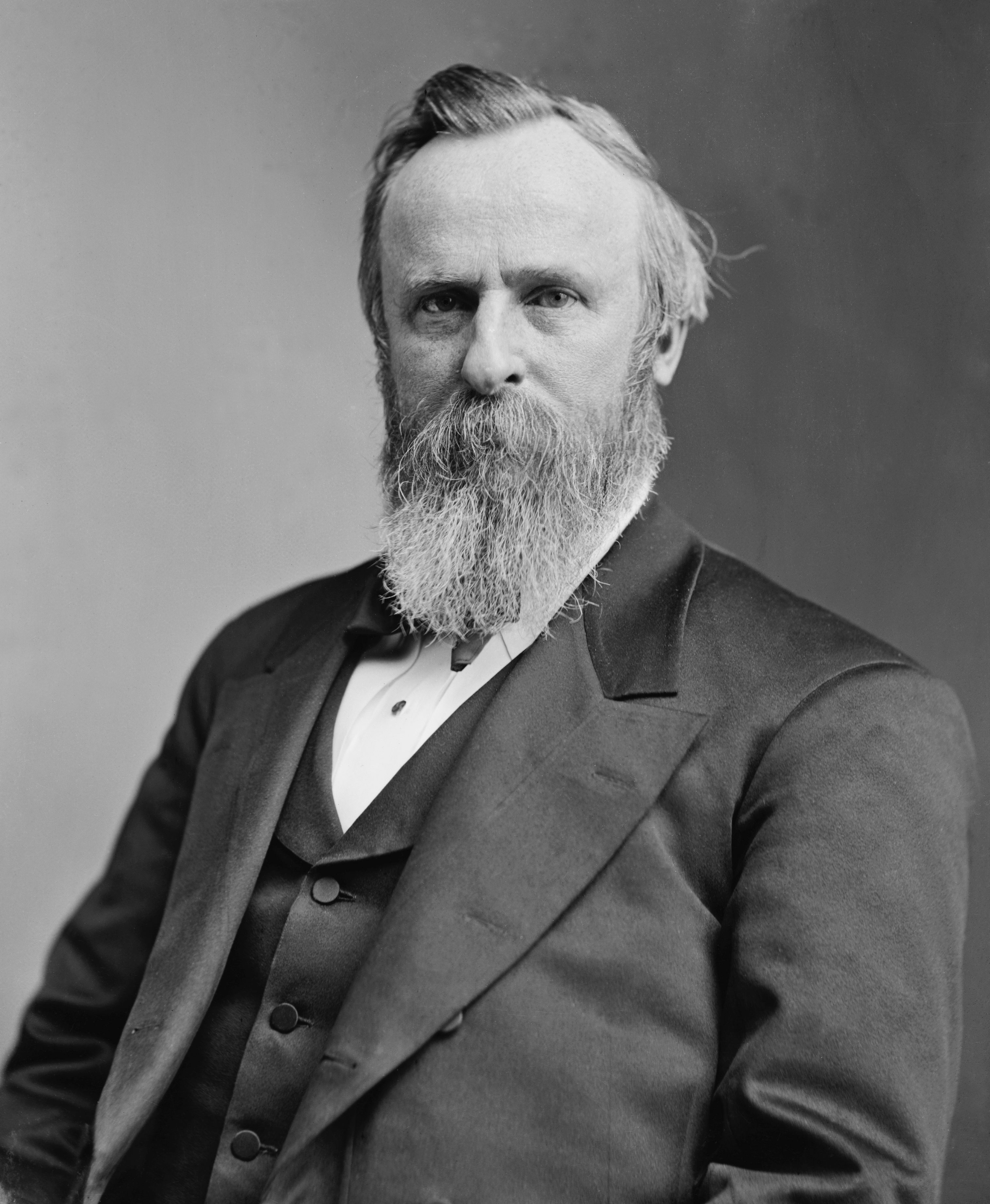
Rutherford B. Hayes

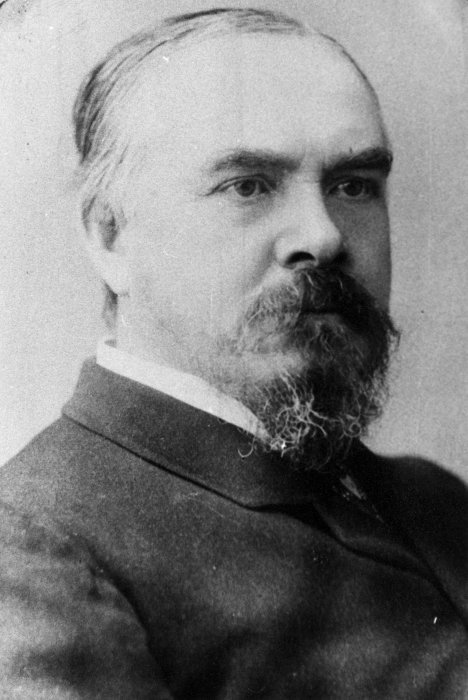
John Ballance

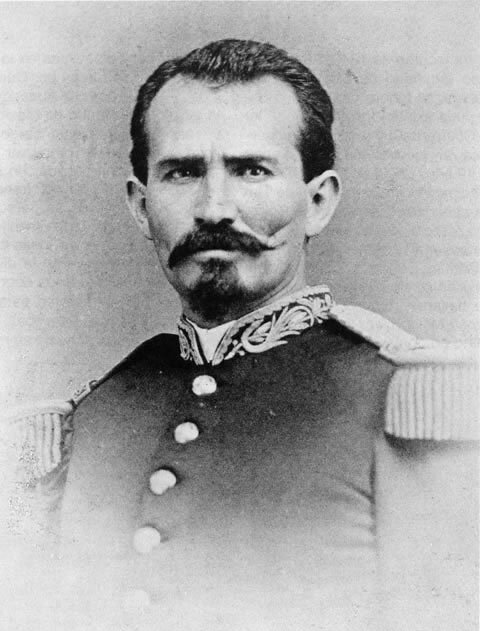
Manuel Gonzalez Flores

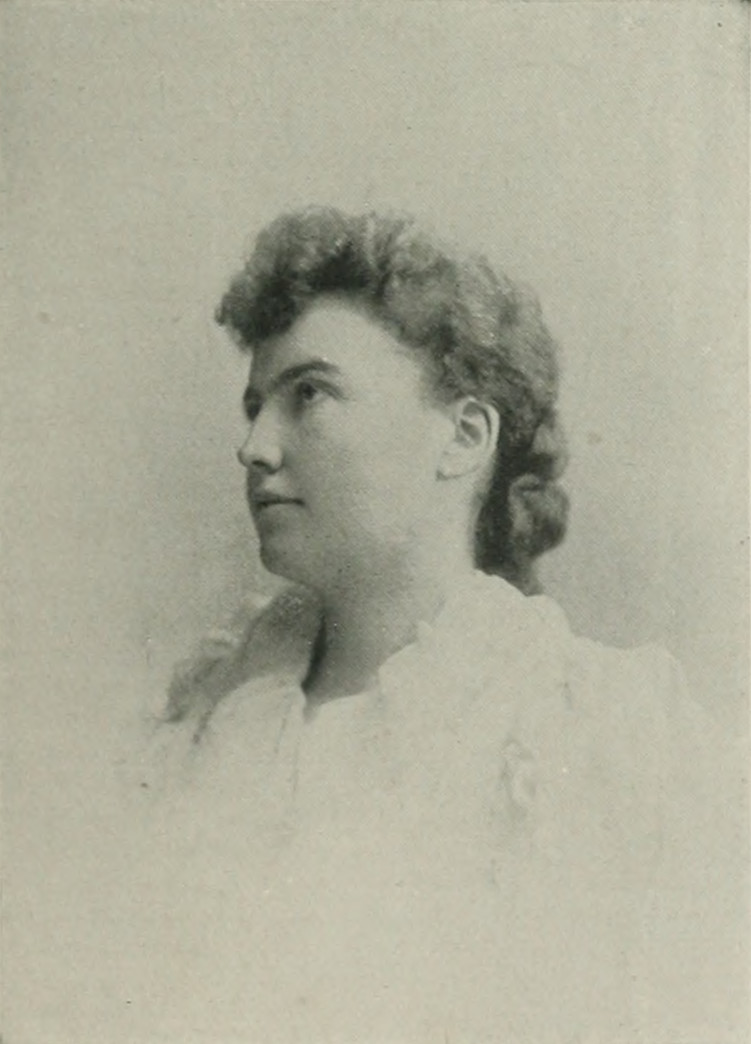
Margaret Manton Merrill

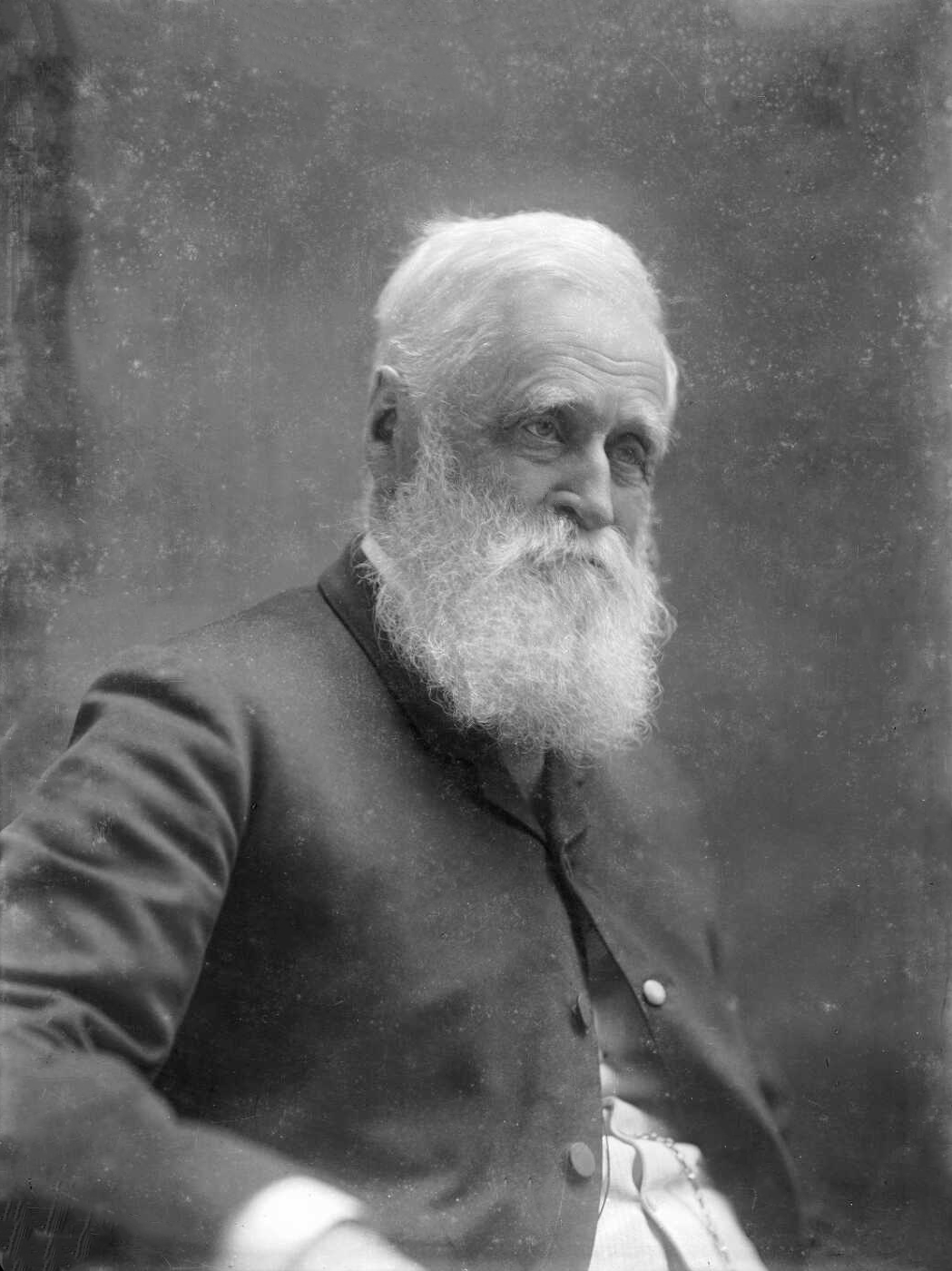
William Fox

- January 2 – John Obadiah Westwood, British entomologist (b. 1805)
- January 7 – Jožef Stefan, Slovenian physicist, mathematician, and poet (b. 1835)
- January 11 – Benjamin Butler, American lawyer, politician, and general (b. 1818)
- January 17 – Rutherford B. Hayes, 19th President of the United States (b. 1822)
- January 23 – Lucius Quintus Cincinnatus Lamar, U.S. Supreme Court justice (b. 1825)
- January 27 – James G. Blaine, Speaker of the United States House of Representatives, U.S. Senator, and U.S. Secretary of State (b. 1830)
- February 1 – George Henry Sanderson, Mayor of San Francisco (b. 1824)
- February 4 – Concepción Arenal, Spanish feminist writer, activist (b. 1820)
- February 8 – Jennie Casseday, American philanthropist (b. 1840)
- February 10 – Henry Churchill de Mille, American playwright, (b.1853)
- February 13 – Ignacio Manuel Altamirano, first modern Mexican novelist (Clemencia) and (El Zarco) (b. 1834)
- February 17 – Sir Arthur Cumming, British admiral (b. 1817)
- February 18
  - Serranus Clinton Hastings, American politician (b. 1814)
  - King George Tupou I of Tonga (b. 1797)
- February 20 – P. G. T. Beauregard, American Confederate general (b. 1818)
- March 7 – Francisco Robles, 6th President of Ecuador (b. 1811)
- March 16 – William H. Illingworth, English photographer (b. 1844)
- March 17
  - Lucy Isabella Buckstone, English actress (b. 1857)
  - Jules Ferry, French premier (b. 1832)
- March 18
  - George Alexander Baird, (Squire Abington), wealthy English horse breeder (b. 1861)
  - Bandō Kakitsu I, Japanese kabuki actor (b. 1847)
- March 21 – Mary Foot Seymour, American school founder (b. 1846)
- March 30 – Jane Sym-Mackenzie, second wife of Canada's second prime minister (b. 1825)
- April 8 – August Czartoryski, Polish prince (b. 1858)
- April 17 – Lucy Larcom, American teacher and author (b. 1824)
- April 19 – John Addington Symonds, English poet, literary critic (b. 1840)
- April 22 – Edward Fitzgerald Beale, American adventurer, businessman (b. 1822)
- April 26 – Harriette Baker, American children's books author (b. 1815)
- April 27 – John Ballance, 14th Premier of New Zealand (b. 1839)
- May 8 – Manuel González Flores, 31st President of Mexico (b. 1833)
- May 10 – Ioan Emanoil Florescu, Romanian general and politician, two-time Prime Minister of Romania (b. 1819)
- June 1 – Silva Porto, Portuguese painter (b. 1850)
- June 7 – Edwin Booth, American actor (b. 1833)
- June 14 – Jakob Frohschammer, German theologian, philosopher (b. 1821)
- June 19 – Margaret Manton Merrill, English-born American journalist and translator (b. 1859)
- June 21 – Leland Stanford, Governor of California (b. 1824)
- June 22 – Sir George Tryon, British admiral (b. 1832)
- June 23
  - Sir William Fox, 2nd Premier of New Zealand (b. 1812)
  - Sir Theophilus Shepstone, South African statesman (b. 1817)

=== July–December ===
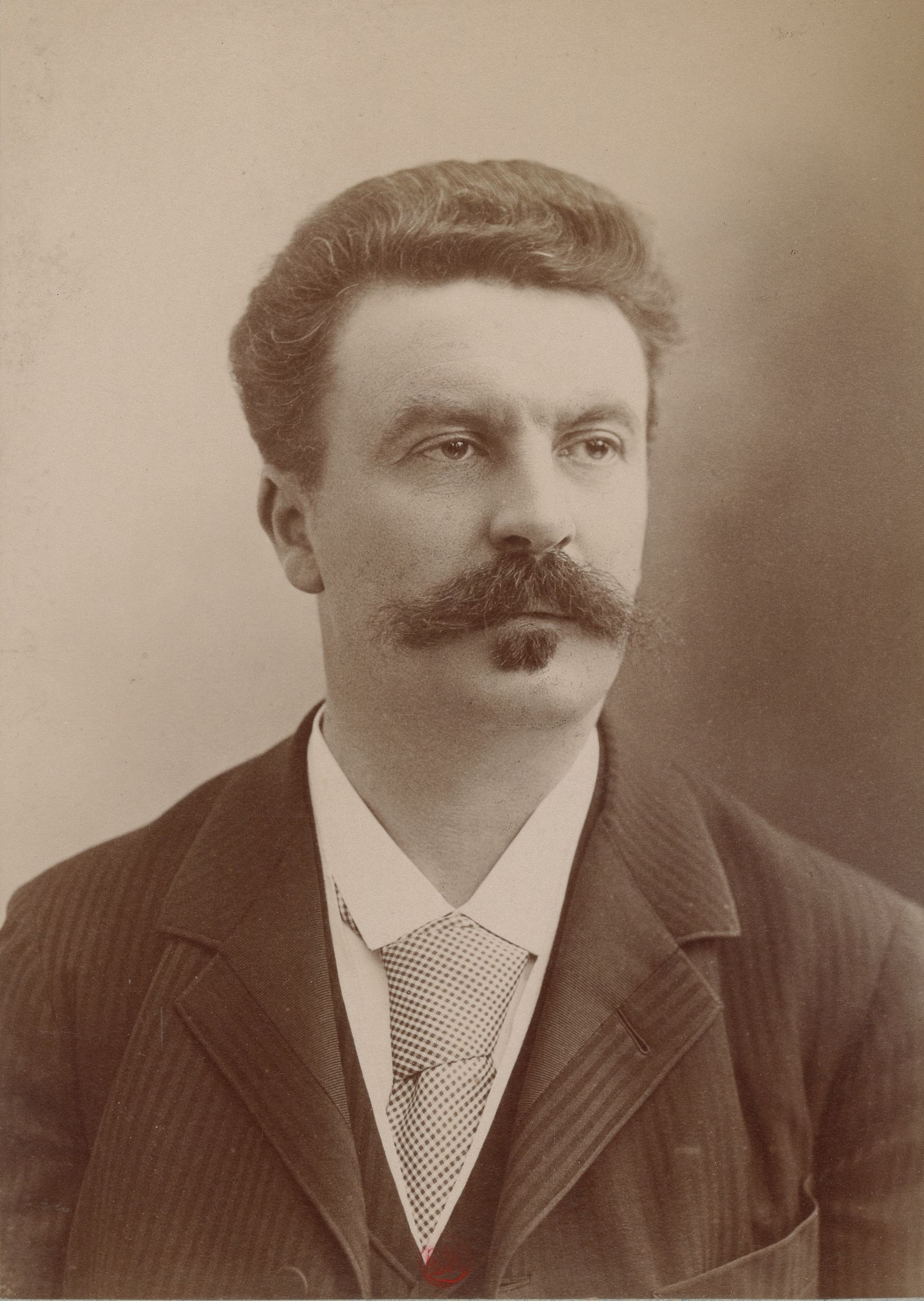
Guy de Maupassant

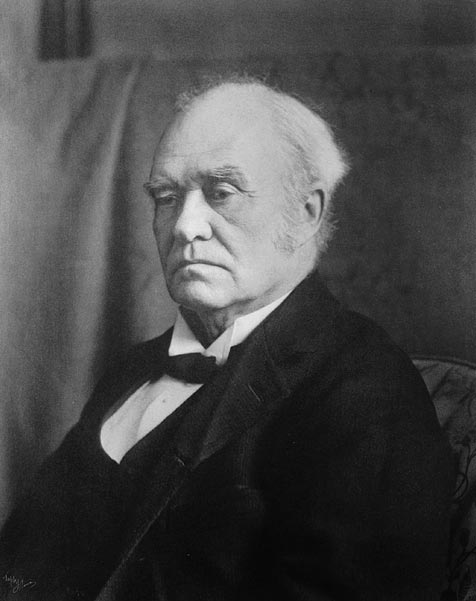
John Abbott

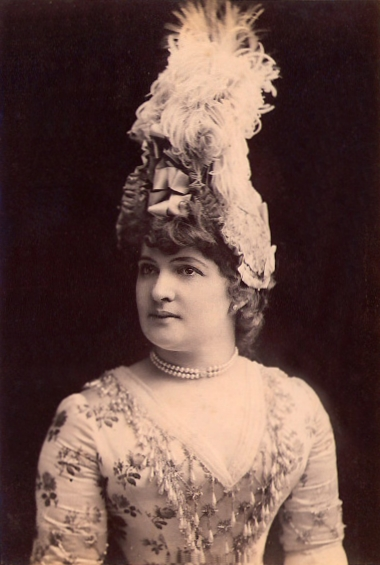
Annie Pixley

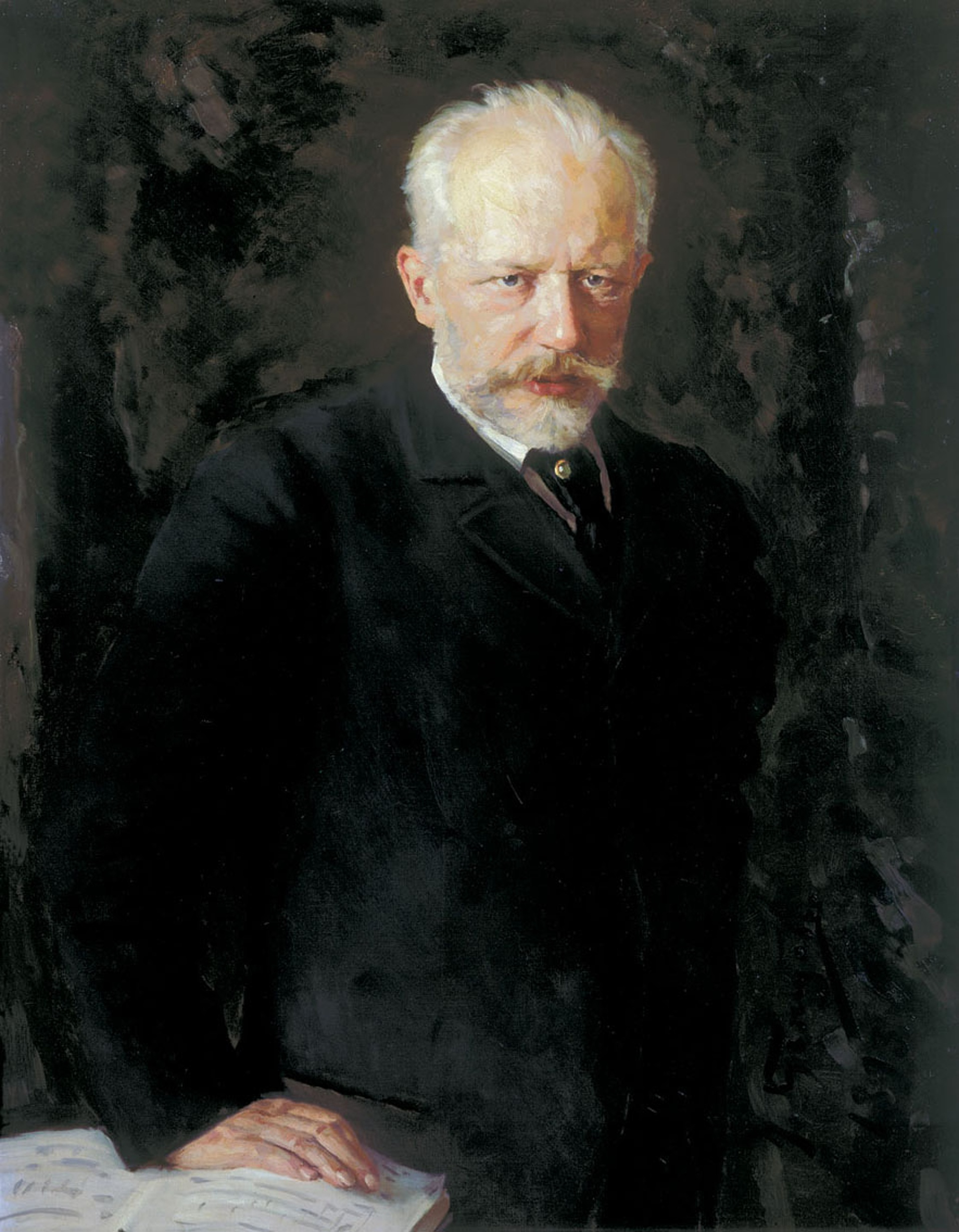
Pyotr Ilyich Tchaikovsky

- July 2 – Georgiana Drew, American actress, comedian (b. 1856)
- July 6 – Guy de Maupassant, French writer (b. 1850)
- July 16 – Antonio Ghislanzoni, Italian politician, journalist (b. 1833)
- August 6 – Jean-Jacques Challet-Venel, member of the Swiss Federal Council (b. 1811)
- August 7 – Alfredo Catalani, Italian composer (b. 1854)
- August 16 – Jean-Martin Charcot, French neurologist (b. 1825)
- August 20 – Baron Alexander Wassilko von Serecki, Governor of the Duchy of Bucovina, member of the Herrenhaus (b. 1827)
- August 31 – Lucy Hamilton Hooper, American writer and editor (b. 1835)
- September 9 – Friedrich Traugott Kützing, German pharmacist, botanist and phycologist (b. 1807)
- September 28 – Bella French Swisher, American writer, editor, and publisher (b. 1837)
- October 6 – Ford Madox Brown, English painter (b. 1821)
- October 8 – John Willis Menard, African-American politician (b. 1838)
- October 10 – Lip Pike, American baseball player (b. 1845)
- October 17 – Patrice de MacMahon, Duke of Magenta, French general, politician, and 1st president of the Third Republic (1875-1879) (b. 1808)
- October 18 – Charles Gounod, French composer (b. 1818)
- October 22 – Duleep Singh, ruler of Punjab (b. 1838)
- October 30 – Sir John Abbott, 3rd Prime Minister of Canada (b. 1821)
- November 6 – Pyotr Ilyich Tchaikovsky, Russian composer (b. 1840)
- November 8 – Annie Pixley, American actress (b. 1848)
- November 11 – Charles H. Bell, American politician (b. 1823)
- November 17 – Alexander of Battenberg, first prince of Bulgaria (b. 1857)
- November 22 – James Calder, 5th President of Pennsylvania State University (b. 1826)
- November 24 – Belle Hunt Shortridge, American author (b. 1858)
- November 28
  - Sir Alexander Cunningham, British engineer and archaeologist (b. 1814)
  - Talbot Baines Reed, English author (b. 1852)
- December 8 – Alexandru Cernat, Moldavian-born Romanian general and politician (b. 1828)
- December 11 – William Milligan, Scottish theologian (b. 1821)
- December 25 – Marie Durocher, Brazilian obstetrician, physician (b. 1809)

=== Date unknown ===
- Margaret Fox, American spiritualist medium (b. 1833)
