= Eleanor Hinder =

Australian welfare officer and international public servant (1893–1963)

Eleanor Hinder OBE
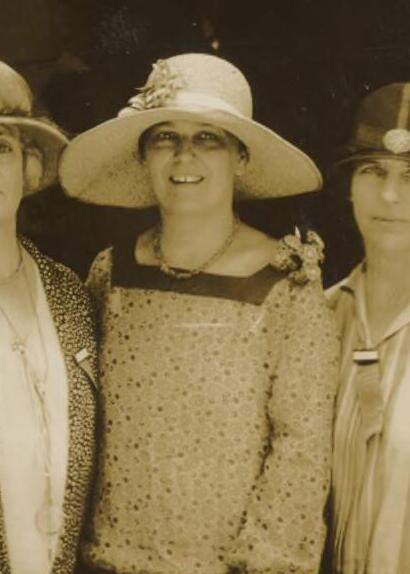
- Hinder in 1928
- Born: 19 January 1893; Maitland, Colony of New South Wales
- Died: 10 April 1963 (aged 70); San Francisco, United States
- Education: University of Sydney
- Employer(s): Farmer & Co. Ltd; YWCA; Shanghai Municipal Council; Foreign Office; United Nations
- Partner: Addie Viola Smith
- Relatives: Marie Farquharson (sister)

Eleanor Mary Hinder OBE (19 January 1893 – 10 April 1963) was an Australian social worker, public servant, and United Nations official. She lived in the Shanghai International Settlement from 1926 to 1942, working for the Young Women's Christian Association (YWCA) and Shanghai Municipal Council. She later worked as an official with the British Foreign Office and the United Nations.

== Early life ==
Hinder was born on 19 January 1893 in East Maitland, New South Wales. She was one of eight children born to Sarah Florence (née Mills) and Robert John Hinder. Her father was a long-serving principal of Maitland Boys' High School, while her sister Marie Farquharson was a prominent community worker in New South Wales.

Hinder attended Maitland West Girls' High School and Sydney Teachers' College, graduating Bachelor of Science from the University of Sydney in 1914. She subsequently worked as a biology teacher at North Sydney Girls High School and as a science tutor at the University of Sydney. She was secretary of the Sydney University Women Graduates' Association from 1919 to 1925, and helped establish the Australian Federation of University Women.

== Welfare work ==
In 1919, Hinder joined Sydney department store Farmer & Co. Ltd as welfare superintendent. In that role she was a pioneer of human resource management and industrial psychology in Australia, establishing staff committees to discuss working conditions, staff training classes, a first-aid service, and staff recreational, social and cultural associations. Hinder compiled detailed statistics on employee absentee rates which were analysed by the federal Department of Health. She was also active in the Young Women's Christian Association (YWCA) and with Jean Stevenson helped establish the City Girls Amateur Sports Association.

In 1923, Farmers sponsored Hinder to undertake an international study tour of industrial welfare. She visited China, Japan, Canada, the United States, England, Switzerland and Norway, attending an International Federation of University Women conference in Oslo.

=== China ===
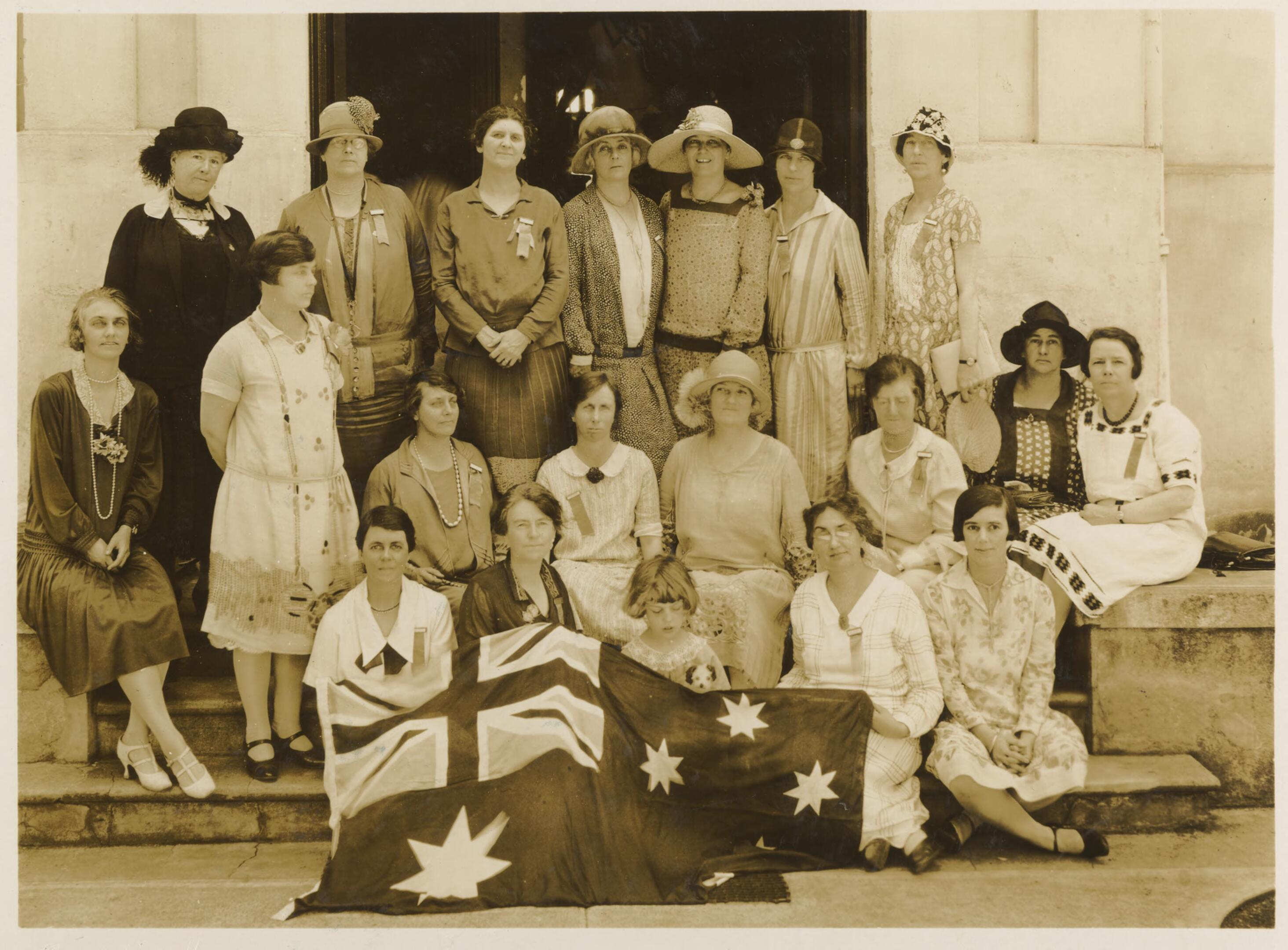
Hinder (top row, fifth from left) with other Australian delegates to the 1928 Pan-Pacific Women's Conference in Hawaii

Hinder first visited Shanghai in 1923 at the request of World YWCA industrial secretary Mary Dingman. In 1926, she moved to Shanghai to work in the industrial department of the National YWCA of China. She "engaged in efforts towards the amelioration of industrial conditions, particularly for women and child factory workers", and worked for better regulation of labour in the Shanghai International Settlement which remained outside of Chinese jurisdiction.

In 1928, Hinder attended the inaugural Pan-Pacific Women's Conference in Hawaii where she was organising programme secretary. She was also part of the Australian delegation to the Institute of Pacific Relations conference in Kyoto in 1929. She resumed her work with the National YWCA of China in 1930 as international education officer, where she wrote a series of articles for the North China Daily News on new industrial legislation and assisted sociologist Chen Da in his studies of the legislation.

Hinder took up an appointment with the Shanghai Municipal Council as chief of its social and industrial division in 1933. Her activities were limited by the council's refusal to adopt Chinese labour laws, restricting her to "disseminating information about industrial health and safety and by providing training for workers". She was also given responsibility for monitoring the welfare of mui tsai (young women in various degrees of domestic servitude) within the city. She remained in Shanghai until August 1942, several months after the Japanese occupation of Shanghai.

== Foreign Office and UN work ==
In 1942, Hinder joined the Foreign Office in London. She worked at the International Labour Organization in Montreal for a period, then from 1944 to 1948 served as a British representative on the technical committee of the United Nations Relief and Rehabilitation Association. She was also a member of the British delegation to the inaugural conference of the United Nations Economic Commission for Asia and the Far East in 1947 and at discussions on the Colombo Plan.

Hinder joined the United Nations in 1951 as chief of the project planning division in the Technical Assistance Administration (TAA). She served as chief of the Office for Asia and the Far East from 1953 to 1955, then from 1957 to 1959 worked for the United Nations Statistical Office, where she was administered a "special programme of assistance to Asian governments in connection with their 1960-1961 censuses of population and of agriculture".

In 1955, Hinder accompanied a TAA-sponsored Indian delegation to the Soviet Union – the only woman and only non-Indian on the tour. She praised the role of women in the Soviet Union filling positions of authority and stated that she "felt indeed that I was participating in a historic moment, that the sharing of technical knowledge between these two peoples through the United Nations had significance beyond even the great benefits involved in the sharing".

== Personal life ==
Hinder was in a long-term relationship with Addie Viola Smith, an American diplomat whom she met in Shanghai. They lived together in Shanghai until 1941 and subsequently in New York until 1959, frequently travelling together for Hinder's UN work. Hinder made several unsuccessful applications for permanent residency in the United States, leading them to opt to settle in Sydney in 1957. They occupied an apartment in Neutral Bay owned by Hinder's niece.

Hinder died from a coronary occlusion in San Francisco on 10 April 1963, while travelling to New York.
