= Addie Viola Smith =

American Foreign Service officer (1893–1975)

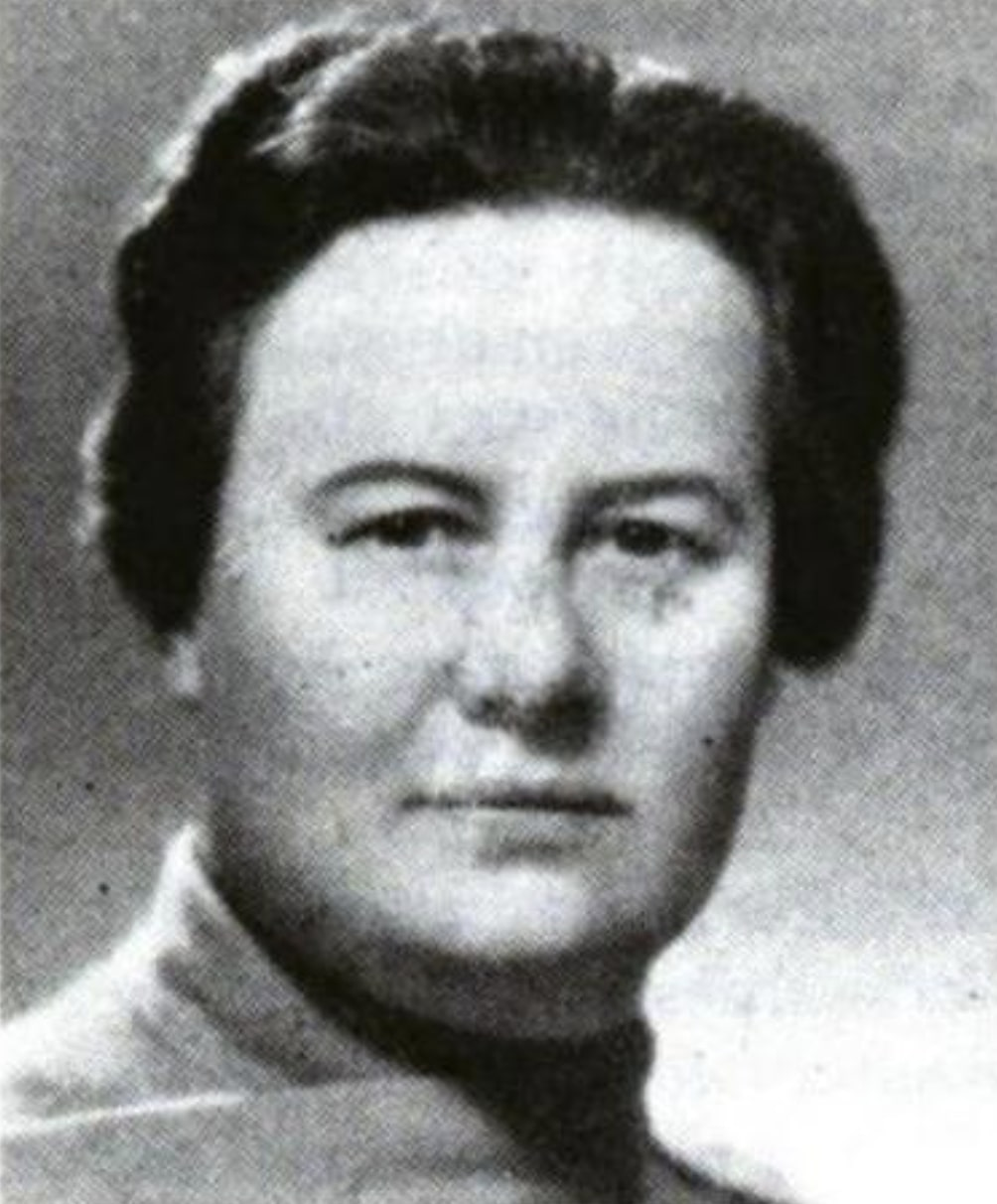
- Smith in 1948

Consul and secretary to the Consulate General of the United States, Shanghai
- In office 1939–c. 1942

Trade commissioner in Shanghai, Bureau of Foreign and Domestic Commerce, United States Department of Commerce
- In office January 1, 1928 – 1939

Assistant trade commissioner in Shanghai
- In office November 1, 1922 – December 31, 1927

Personal details
- Born: November 14, 1893 Stockton, California, U.S.
- Died: December 13, 1975 (aged 82) Mosman, New South Wales, Australia
- Domestic partner: Eleanor Hinder
- Education: Washington College of Law (LL.B., 1920)
- Occupation: Attorney
- Profession: Foreign Service officer
- Known for: First woman Department of Commerce FSO, assistant trade commissioner, and trade commissioner

Addie Viola Smith (November 14, 1893 – December 13, 1975), also known as Shi Fanglan (Chinese: 施芳蘭; pinyin: Shī Fānglán), was an American attorney who served as the United States trade commissioner to Shanghai from 1928 to 1939. She was the first female Foreign Service officer in the United States Foreign Service to work under the United States Department of Commerce, the first woman to serve as an assistant trade commissioner, and the first woman to serve as trade commissioner.

Smith was born and raised in Stockton, California. In 1917, she moved to Washington, D.C. While working for the United States Department of Labor, she attended the Washington College of Law part-time, earning her bachelor of laws in 1920. In October that year she joined the Foreign Service and was assigned to Beijing as a clerk in the trade commissioner's office. Smith was promoted to assistant trade commissioner in Shanghai in 1922, and appointed trade commissioner of Shanghai in 1928, a post she held until 1939. For the remainder of her career, she held several roles in the United States government, international organizations, and the United Nations.

Throughout her life, Smith was also a member of several feminist organizations; scholars have described her international feminist activism as being rooted in imperialist and colonialist attitudes. Smith met her life partner, Eleanor Hinder, in Shanghai in 1926. They lived together until Hinder's death in 1963. Smith died on December 13, 1975, aged 82, in Mosman, New South Wales, and was cremated. She and Hinder were memorialized by their friends with two stone seats at the E.G. Waterhouse National Camellia Gardens in Caringbah.

== Early life (1893–1920) ==
Addie Viola Smith was born in Stockton, California, on November 14, 1893, to Rufus Roy Smith, a publisher, and Addie Gabriela Smith (née Brown). From 1910 to 1917, Smith worked for two wholesale companies. She also learned stenography and earned a degree in business administration from Heald's Business College in San Francisco. In 1917, she passed county, state, and federal civil service exams. She moved to Washington, D.C., in April 1917, and was hired into the United States Department of Labor by Julia Lathrop, the director of the United States Children's Bureau, to work under Grace Abbott in implementing recently passed child labor legislation. Smith also served as a confidential clerk to an assistant secretary of labor, assistant chief of the Women's Division of the United States Employment Service, and chief of the Information Division of the United States Training and Dilution Service. In 1919, she worked on the first National Industrial Conference and edited the proceedings of the first International Labor Office Conference.

During her service with the Labor Department, Smith attended the Washington College of Law as a part-time student and obtained a bachelor of laws degree in 1920. She was also mentored by a network of women in government and politics, whom she drew upon throughout her career.

== Early foreign service career in China (1920–1927) ==
Smith was appointed to the United States Foreign Service as a Foreign Service officer in October 1920 and assigned to the Bureau of Foreign and Domestic Commerce under the United States Department of Commerce. She was the first woman to serve as a Foreign Service officer under the Bureau. Smith initially worked as a clerk in the trade commissioner's office in Beijing. As a clerk, Smith was responsible for surveying industry, compiling data, and identifying investment opportunities.

Early in 1922, Smith requested permission to sit for a civil service examination so that she could obtain a promotion to assistant trade commissioner. Despite support from her immediate supervisor and American businesses operating in China, the assistant director of the Bureau of Foreign and Domestic Commerce, O. P. Hopkins, denied her application. Hopkins wrote to Smith: "The Bureau has not yet made any definite decision as to what its policy will be toward employing women as assistant trade commissioners and trade commissioners." Smith wrote back, stating that "the opening of higher positions to women is not nearly so 'grave and serious' a matter, as is the caliber of the representatives, be they men or women, which the Bureau sends to its foreign posts", and that she had a right to sit for the exam. The former chief of the Woman's Division of the United States Employment Service, Hilda Muhlhauser Richards, also intervened on Smith's behalf—threatening to "take the issue to New York women's organizations"—prompting Hopkins to reverse his decision. Smith became the first woman appointed to the post of assistant trade commissioner on November 1, 1922.

== Trade commissioner in Shanghai (1928–1939) ==
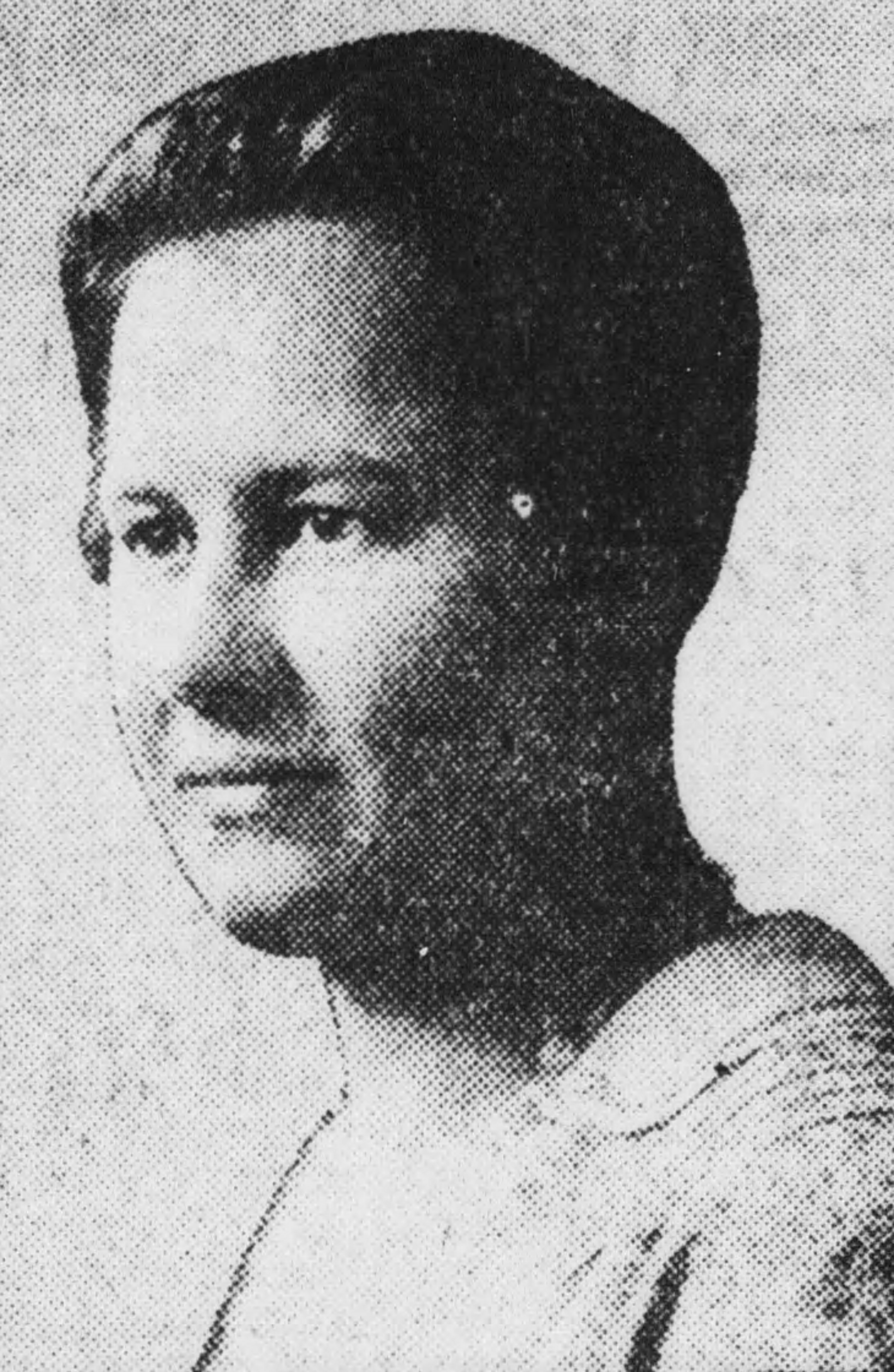
Addie Viola Smith, c. 1928

While serving as assistant trade commissioner, Smith again sought promotion to full trade commissioner. After an initial rejection, she sought help from Clara Burdette, president of the California Federation of Women's Clubs, who appealed to Herbert Hoover, the then-Secretary of Commerce and a personal friend. As it happened, Smith's appointment had already been confirmed by Julean Arnold, her immediate superior, and she took up the role on January 1, 1928. Smith was the first female trade commissioner in the Foreign Service. She also served as the registrar of the Chinese Trade Act of 1922. In that role, Smith was responsible for ensuring corporate compliance with registration requirements, sometimes litigating against firms herself in the United States Court for China—becoming the third woman to be admitted to practice before the court in 1934.

As trade commissioner, Smith was responsible for reporting on Chinese industry, infrastructure, and trade opportunities to the Department of Commerce; advising American business interests; serving as a liaison between American and Chinese businesses; implementing U.S. trade policy; and promoting the expansion of American trade in China. During her tenure, she was respected by her colleagues and by Americans doing business in China. Barbara Miller, in 1936, wrote for the Los Angeles Times Sunday Magazine: "Business men visiting China generally agree, 'If you want accurate information on foreign trade—and want it today—go to Viola Smith.'"

Smith was an avid motorist, driving thousands of miles in China throughout her career. She was considered an expert on roads in China, and she was regularly consulted by the Chinese government and American companies on road proposals and related business opportunities. As trade commissioner, she prioritized building roads as a means of increasing the import of American automobiles to China.

In 1935, Smith began lobbying to bring shortwave radio broadcasting to China, believing that there was demand among American expatriates in Asia and estimating the Shanghai market at approximately 12,000 listeners. She believed that this market would purchase American-made receivers; that both American expatriates and Chinese listeners would purchase American goods advertised on radio programs; and that American radio would improve China–United States relations. In 1937, she persuaded General Electric to open W6XBE, which rebroadcast NBC's domestic radio programs to China from the San Francisco Bay Area. The station launched on February 19, 1939. Based on feedback from other Americans in China, Smith worked to improve its programming, suggesting that the station "give succinct resumes of important American happenings and events, to be given by prominent persons identified with American governmental, commercial, financial, and cultural life", such as "broadcasts of Carnegie Hall concerts, symphony orchestras, military bands, and similar items".

== Post-trade commissioner career (1939–1975) ==
Smith resigned as trade commissioner in 1939, when she was appointed consul and secretary to the United States Consulate in Shanghai. In that role, she worked to evacuate Americans during the 1941 Japanese invasion of the Shanghai International Settlement. From 1942 to 1946, Smith lived and worked in Washington, D.C. She served as an economic specialist for the United States Department of State from 1942 to 1943, and worked with the China America Council of Commerce and Industry on post-war trade from 1944 to 1946. She returned to China in 1946 to open the council's Shanghai headquarters—a move that the Associated Press described as "[a]n indication that China is beginning to right itself after eight years' war with Japan"—and then worked for private companies and the United States China Relief Mission.

In 1949, Smith left China and moved to Bangkok, where she worked for the United States Economic Cooperation Administration and the United Nations Economic Commission for Asia and the Far East. From 1952 to 1964, she was the representative of the International Federation of Women Lawyers to the United Nations in New York; in her later years, she conducted much of her work from Sydney.

== International feminist activism ==
During her time in Shanghai, Smith joined and helped to organize international feminist groups. She was a member of several organizations, including the American Women's Club of Shanghai and the Joint Committee of Shanghai Women's Organizations. She was nominated to run for the Shanghai Municipal Council in 1930 by women's groups, but withdrew after receiving a cable from the Department of Commerce that stated it would be "undesirable" for Smith to serve on the council. Smith and other Western expatriates viewed their role as engaging in dialogue with Chinese women and "sincerely endeavor[ing] to reflect the best of American ideals and traditions".

According to the historians Alexandra Epstein and Sarah Paddle, Smith and her contemporaries also adopted colonialist or imperialist mindsets, seeking to instill American values in China through intellectual exchange and philanthropy. Their views and actions sometimes caused tension with Chinese women activists. For example, in August 1928, Smith attended the inaugural Pan-Pacific Women's Conference, a meeting of internationalist feminists in Honolulu, Territory of Hawaii, along with two Chinese women, her partner Eleanor Hinder, and another Western expatriate woman in China. At the conference, Smith—without consulting the Chinese members of her delegation—suggested that China host the next conference in 1930, causing what Epstein has called an "international incident". Me-Iung Ting, a Chinese physician and feminist activist, responded: "If the next conference is going to be held in China the invitation should be from the Chinese women".

== Personal life ==
Smith met her life partner, Eleanor Hinder, in March 1926. Hinder, an Australian woman, was then working on a fellowship grant with the Young Women's Christian Association. Soon thereafter, Hinder and Smith fell in love, and Hinder moved into Smith's apartment. They lived together in Shanghai until 1941—with some periods spent apart as a result of work and war—where they were "devoted to each other, shar[ing] a house[ ] and creat[ing] a garden". During the 1950s, Smith and Hinder spent much of their time living in New York, traveling often for Smith's work with the United Nations. After Hinder was denied United States citizenship, Smith and Hinder established a residence in Sydney, Australia, in 1957. Smith was a member of the Royal Australian Historical Society, the League of Women Voters, Sydney, and the Australian Local Government Women's Association, serving as its vice president from 1968 to 1970. Hinder died in 1963; Smith remained close with her family and chronicled their genealogy. As executrix of Hinder's estate, she compiled and annotated Hinder's papers for contribution to the Mitchell Library. In 1975, she published Women in Australian Parliament and Local Government, which at the time was believed to be the only comprehensive record of women who had served in the Australian government.

Smith died on December 13, 1975, aged 82, in Mosman, New South Wales, and was cremated. Smith and Hinder were memorialized in 1977 by their friends and women's groups with the placement of two stone seats at the E.G. Waterhouse National Camellia Gardens in Caringbah. One of the seats was put near an entrance to the gardens. The other was placed next to a camellia, planted by Smith, named "China Doll".

== Sources ==
=== Books and journal articles ===
- Epstein, Alexandra (2008). "International Feminism and Empire-Building between the Wars: The Case of Viola Smith". Women's History Review. 17 (5): 699–719. doi:10.1080/09612020802316785 – via Taylor & Francis.
- Krysko, Michael A. (2011). American Radio in China: International Encounters with Technology and Communications, 1919–41. Palgrave Studies in the History of the Media. London: Palgrave Macmillan. p. 92. doi:10.1057/9780230301931. ISBN 978-1-349-32230-5 – via Springer.
- Paddle, Sarah (2001). "'For the China of the Future': Western Feminists, Colonisation and International Citizenship in China in the Inter-War Years". Australian Feminist Studies. 16 (36): 325–341. doi:10.1080/08164640120097552 – via Taylor & Francis.
- Thompson, Peter (2011). Shanghai Fury: Australian Heroes of Revolutionary China. North Sydney: Random House Australia. ISBN 978-1-86-471183-7 – via Internet Archive.

=== Newspapers and magazines ===
- "Americans Meet This Afternoon for Selection of Two Candidates". The China Press. February 28, 1930. p. 1. ProQuest 1321965166.
- "Roads Prove Greatest Unification Factor in Modern China, American Trade Commissioner Declares". The China Press. June 30, 1935. p. D16. ProQuest 1371746558.
- "Back to China". The Kingston Daily Freeman. Kingston, N.Y. Associated Press. March 11, 1946. p. 4 – via Newspapers.com.
- "American Girl in U.S. China Post". The Brooklyn Standard Union. November 21, 1922. p. 7 – via Newspapers.com.
- "American Woman Lawyer: Miss A. Viola Smith Admitted". The Hongkong Telegraph. January 31, 1934. p. 1 – via Internet Archive.
- Miller, Barbara (November 22, 1936). "China's Five-and-Ten Cent Store". Los Angeles Times Sunday Magazine. pp. 6, 25 – via Newspapers.com.
- "China-America Council Sending Own Representative to China". The New York Times. February 23, 1946. p. 25. ProQuest 107533486.
- Parkhurst, Genevieve (May 17, 1919). "Was Ready When Opportunity Arose". Forbes. Vol. 4, no. 5. p. 1032 – via Internet Archive.
- "She Writes to 64 Countries". The Sun-Herald. August 19, 1962. p. 101 – via Newspapers.com.
- "Women Recall the Work of Viola Smith". The Sydney Morning Herald. April 5, 1977. p. 13 – via Newspapers.com.
- "Over China's Roads". The Toowoomba Chronicle and Darling Downs Gazette. July 25, 1933. p. 3 – via Newspapers.com.

=== Other ===
- Barker, Heather (2006) [2002]. "Addie Viola Smith (1893–1975)". Australian Dictionary of Biography. Canberra: National Centre of Biography, Australian National University. Archived from the original on February 22, 2024.
- Calkin, Homer L. (1978). Women in the Department of State: Their Role in American Foreign Affairs (Report). Washington, D.C.: United States Government Printing Office. United States Department of State Publication 8951. Department and Foreign Service Series 166. U.S. Government Printing Office Stock No. 044-000-01707-5 – via Internet Archive.
- Carey, Jane (November 1, 2016) [December 22, 2004]. "Smith, Addie Viola". The Australian Women's Register. AWE1144. Archived from the original on May 18, 2024.
- Stanoff, Thai-Van (2023). "Guide to the Addie Viola Smith Papers". Online Archive of California. Archived from the original on April 28, 2024.
