= Michael Cox (cricketer) =

Australian cricketer

Personal information
- Full name: Michael John Cox
- Born: 26 April 1957 (age 69); Newcastle, New South Wales, Australia
- Batting: Right-handed
- Role: Wicket-keeper

Domestic team information
- Years: Team
- 1986–1987: Western Australia

Career statistics
Competition	FC	LA
Matches	7	5
Runs scored	97	61
Batting average	12.12	20.33
100s/50s	0/0	0/0
Top score	31	38
Catches/stumpings	23/2	10/0
- Source: CricketArchive, 1 January 2013

Michael John Cox (born 26 April 1957) is a former Australian cricketer who played several matches for Western Australia during the mid-1980s. Born in Newcastle, Cox grew up in New South Wales, where he attended Maitland Boys High School and captained the school's cricket team. Having played for local teams in Maitland and Newcastle, he was selected for several regional representative sides before moving to Sydney where he played with Gordon in the Sydney grade cricket competition. Although Cox played several times at colts level, he was never selected for the New South Wales state team and eventually moved to Western Australia to further his opportunities. His only matches at state level came during the 1985–86 and 1986–87 seasons, when Western Australia's usual wicket-keeper, Tim Zoehrer, was unavailable due to national selection. Cox achieved moderate success in both Sheffield Shield and McDonald's Cup matches, but was dropped when after Zoehrer's return.

== Career ==
Cox was born in Newcastle, New South Wales, to John and Marie Cox. He grew up in country New South Wales, at various times living with family in Maitland, Bellbird, and Cessnock. Cox played with the Northern Districts Cricket Club (now Northern Suburbs) in the Maitland & District Cricket Association from an early age, making his third-grade debut at the age of 10 as a spin bowler. Progressing to first grade in the 1970–71 season, aged 14, he soon switched to wicket-keeping, a position in which he excelled. However, due to a back injury, Cox missed the entire 1973–74 season, instead spending time as an umpire in the local competition. Resuming the following season, he switched to the Charlestown Cricket Club in the Newcastle grade cricket competition. Cox also attended Maitland Boys High School, and played cricket for the school's team as a wicket-keeper. Having captained the school's team to victory in the 1975 Davidson Shield, he was awarded a cricket blue by the Combined High Schools Sports Association. After two seasons playing with Charlestown, he signed with the Gordon Cricket Club in the Sydney grade cricket competition, hoping for eventual selection in the New South Wales state team.

After continued good form in local matches, including an innings of 100 not out for a Sydney Metropolitan representative side against an Australian Capital Territory–Illawarra side during the 1976–77 season, Cox was selected for the New South Wales state colts team in two matches during the 1977–78 season, and went on to play for the side in the two seasons following. He was, however, unable to progress to the state team, with Steve Rixon already well established in the team. Seeking opportunities at state level, Cox moved to Western Australia for the 1985–86 season in the hope of gaining selection there. With usually wicket-keeper Tim Zoehrer on national duty, Cox's first match at state level came in February 1986, a limited-overs match against Queensland. He went on to play in two further one-day matches and two first-class matches that season. In one Shield match against South Australia, he dismissed five batsmen in South Australia's first innings (four catches and one stumping), but was unable to keep wicket in the second innings, instead being replaced by Doug Harris. With Zoehrer still on national duty, Cox again played during the 1986–87 season. He was relatively successful as a wicket-keeper, managing fourteen dismissals (thirteen catches and one stumping) from his four Shield matches. His batting was less successful, with career averages of 12.12 at first-class level and 20.33 at List A level. Zoehrer returned to Western Australia midway through the season, and Cox did not play at state level again.

== See also ==
- List of Western Australia first-class cricketers
