= Doug Harris (cricketer) =

Australian cricketer

Personal information
- Full name: Douglas James Harris
- Born: 20 December 1962 (age 63); Subiaco, Western Australia
- Batting: Right-handed
- Role: Wicket-keeper

Domestic team information
- Years: Team
- 1990/91: Western Australia

Career statistics
Competition	First-class
Matches	1
Runs scored	23
Batting average	11.50
100s/50s	0/0
Top score	23
Catches/stumpings	1/0
- Source: CricketArchive, 1 January 2013

Douglas James Harris (born 20 December 1962) is a former Australian cricketer. From Perth, Harris excelled at junior levels, and represented the Australian national under-19 cricket team in a three-Test series during the 1980–81 season. He was named Man of the Series after scoring 195 runs from five innings. From the early 1980s, Harris was regularly selected in state colts and second XI matches, though Tim Zoehrer was generally the first-choice wicket-keeper at state level. In a Sheffield Shield match against South Australia during the 1985–86 season, Western Australia's wicket-keeper Michael Cox was unavailable to keep wicket in South Australia's second innings. Despite not having been named twelfth man, Harris substituted for Cox as wicket-keeper, and recorded two stumpings off the bowling of Wayne Andrews. However, these dismissals are not included in his career records.

Harris continued to occasionally play in colts and second XI matches throughout the late 1980s. His sole match at first-class level came during the 1990–91 season, in a Sheffield Shield match against Queensland. In the match, held at the Gabba in February 1991, Harris played as a specialist batsman, opening the batting with Mark Lavender in both innings. He was dismissed for a duck in the first innings, but scored 23 runs in the second innings as part of a 61-run opening stand with Lavender (113*). At grade cricket level, Harris played for both Southern Districts (later Willetton) and Subiaco-Floreat. After retiring, he has filled several positions with the Western Australian Cricket Association (WACA) at various stages, including manager and coach of the state under-19 team, coach of the state second XI, state selector, state high-performance manager, and state talent manager. As state coaching manager, he was also involved in launching the Dennis Lillee Fast Bowling Academy in 2002.
