= Maitland High School =

Location
- East Maitland, New South Wales; Australia
- Coordinates: 32°44′58″S 151°35′44″E

Information
- Former name: Maitland Boys' High School
- Type: Government-funded co-educational comprehensive secondary day school
- Motto: French: En Avant (Go Forward)
- Established: 1884; 142 years ago (as Maitland Boys' High School)
- Educational authority: New South Wales Department of Education
- Principal: Paula Graham
- Teaching staff: 77.6 FTE (2023)
- Years: 7–12
- Enrolment: 936 (2023)
- Campus type: Suburban
- Houses: Scobie-Hughes; Waddy-Portus; McMullen Fraser
- Colours: Black and white
- Website: maitland-h.schools.nsw.gov.au

Maitland High School (abbreviated as MHS) is a government-funded co-educational comprehensive secondary day school, located on High Street, East Maitland, New South Wales, Australia.

Established in 1884 as the boys only single-sex Maitland Boys' High School, in 1986 the school collaborated with Maitland Girls' High School, and now both schools are co-educational, with Maitland Boys' High School renamed as Maitland High School, and Maitland Girls' High School as Maitland Grossmann High School. Maitland High School enrolled approximately 936 students in 2023, from Year 7 to Year 12, of whom 17 percent identified as Indigenous Australians and seven percent were from a language background other than English. The school is operated by the NSW Department of Education.

== Overview ==
In 2009, the efforts of the school were recognised by the Department of Education a school achievement award citing the "consistent excellence in Vocational educational program delivery and quality Higher School Certificate educational outcomes".

The school has adopted the colours of black and white, two of the northern region's three representative colours (black, white, red), and its mascot of a magpie, a popular and prolific bird of the area.

The Maitland High Old Boys and Ex-students Union regularly assists the school with donations and scholarships for students.

The school offers a number of vocational education courses in Year 10 to Year 12 relating to various industries, such as hospitality, retail and community services.

== History ==
The Public Instruction Act 1880 (New South Wales) began a period described as the "great reforms". In 1883 the first six state high schools were opened: for boys and for girls at Sydney, Bathurst and Goulburn. The following year, in 1884, Maitland Boys High and Girls High were opened. The four schools at Sydney and Maitland succeeded but the other High Schools failed to compete with established local private schools and the Superior Public Schools (which did not prepare students for matriculation); at the end of 1886, the two Goulburn schools and Bathurst Boys' High School closed. By 1885, the Minister of Public Instruction could report that Maitland Boys' High School had an average quarterly enrolment of 48 boys and in 1890, 45 (by comparison, Sydney Boys' High had 183 (1885) and 250 (1890); Maitland Girls' High had 15 (1885) and 36 (1890)). Since the High Schools were to prepare students for matriculation, "the University Manual of Public Examinations provided the basis of instruction."

The Maitland High Schools served more than just the Maitland community which, in 1888, was numbered at 9,000; boys and girls came by train from nearby Newcastle and its suburbs, which had 27,750 inhabitants in 1888. This arrangement continued until 1906 when Newcastle High School opened, the first new state high school since the 1884 opening of the Maitland High Schools. To cater for other students, Maitland Boys' High operated a boarding house; the boarding house closed in 1969 and the building was re-opened in 1978 as the R.J. Hinder Memorial Library, a collection which had been funded by the Old Boys' Association in honour of former headmaster Robert John Hinder (father of Eleanor Hinder and Marie Langley Farquharson).

The founding headmaster was the capable John Waterhouse who was recruited from Newington College to guide the Boys' High School through its early years; the sister school was not so fortunate: "the first headmistress was dismissed, the second only lasted a short time. Annie Watson, who took over in 1886, proved capable."

On 6 June 1891, the foundation stone was laid for a new building for the "High School for Boys at Maitland East". The building was completed in June 1892 and opened in July 1892.

=== Co-education and new names ===
From Term 1, 1987, the Minister for Education directed that the former Maitland Boys High and the former Maitland Girls High were to be co-educational; he announced that the schools would be renamed Maitland High School and Evatt High School in honour of the Evatt family whom he described as "the finest family that Maitland has produced, arguably that Australia has produced". The decision caused public controversy and the former Maitland Boys High School was renamed Maitland High School, and the former Maitland Girls High School was renamed Maitland Grossman High School in honour of Jeanette Grossmann who was headmistress of Maitland Girls High school from 1890 to the end of 1913.

== Co-curricular activities ==
=== Performing Arts ===
Maitland High School has a number of dance and musical groups that practise regularly and perform at the school and in the local area. The school showcases the talent of the students at the yearly "MADD" (Music Art Drama Dance) night.

Together with 2,500 other students from around the area, students from Maitland High School participate regularly in the Hunter Schools Dance Festival.

Students at the school also take part in the Star Struck event together with around 3,000 other students from around 140 schools in the Central Coast and Hunter regions. Students from Maitland High School support the event in a number of ways, including as backing vocals, band musicians and production crew members.

=== Sport ===
Maitland High School sends students to participate in a number of competitions in the area at various district and zone events. The school participates in athletics, cross country, swimming, rugby league, cricket and various other team and individual sports.

The following Maitland Boys' High School were awarded "Blues" by the New South Wales Combined High Schools Sports Association under the system which operated from 1957 to 1980:

Year	Sport	Schoolboy
1961	Athletics	J Colbourne
1961	Athletics	G Ryder
1976	Cricket	Michael Cox
1976	Cricket	R Allen

== See also ==
- List of government schools in New South Wales: G–P
- Education in Australia
