= Marie Farquharson =

Australian community worker (1883–1954)

- Born: Marie Langley Hinder; 15 February 1883; Manly, Colony of New South Wales
- Died: 29 December 1954 (aged 71); Neutral Bay, New South Wales, Australia
- Education: Maitland West Girls' High School
- Occupation: Community worker
- Spouse: John Farquharson (m. 1911)
- Children: 2
- Relatives: Eleanor Hinder (sister)

Marie Langley Farquharson (née Hinder; 15 February 1883 – 29 December 1954) was an Australian community worker. She had a long association with the National Council of Women of Australia.

== Early life ==
Farquharson was born on 15 February 1883 in Manly, New South Wales. She was the second of eight children born to Sarah Florence (née Mills) and Robert John Hinder. Her sister Eleanor Hinder was a social worker and United Nations official.

Farquharson grew up in Maitland, New South Wales, where her father was a long-serving principal of Maitland Boys' High School. She attended Maitland West Girls' High School and subsequently trained as a schoolteacher, initially as a pupil-teacher under the monitorial system at West Maitland Superior Public School. In 1905, she was awarded a full scholarship to the Hurlstone Teacher Training College in Sydney. From 1907, she taught at the Riley Street Infants' School, a kindergarten in the working-class suburb of Surry Hills.

After her marriage Farquharson moved to Lismore, where in 1914 she organised a local branch of the Australian Red Cross. She moved back to Sydney in 1923, where she was a correspondent for country newspapers.

== Public work ==
Farquharson became involved in the National Council of Women through her sister Eleanor, who introduced her to NCW officeholder Mildred Muscio. She served three terms as state secretary of the NCW in New South Wales (1926–1932, 1940–1941 and 1953–1954) and was elected as a life vice-president in 1946. At a national level she was international secretary of the National Council of Women of Australia from 1943 to 1954, responsible for dealings with the International Council of Women.

In 1930, during the Great Depression, Farquharson was appointed to the advisory committee to the Unemployment Relief Council of New South Wales. She and Ruby Board helped organise a sewing depot for unemployed women, following concerns raised by the NCW that unemployment relief was mainly targeted towards men. She also helped supervise the NCW hostel for women and babies. Farquharson was honorary secretary of the women's advisory council and executive committee for the First Fleet sesquicentenary celebrations in Sydney in 1938. During World War II she served on the executive of the Australian Comforts Fund, which worked to supply items to Australian soldiers.

== Personal life ==
In 1911, Farquharson married John Gordon Farquharson, an accountant. The couple had two daughters.

Farquharson died on 29 December 1954 at her home in Neutral Bay, New South Wales.
