= Margaret Manton Merrill =

British-born American journalist

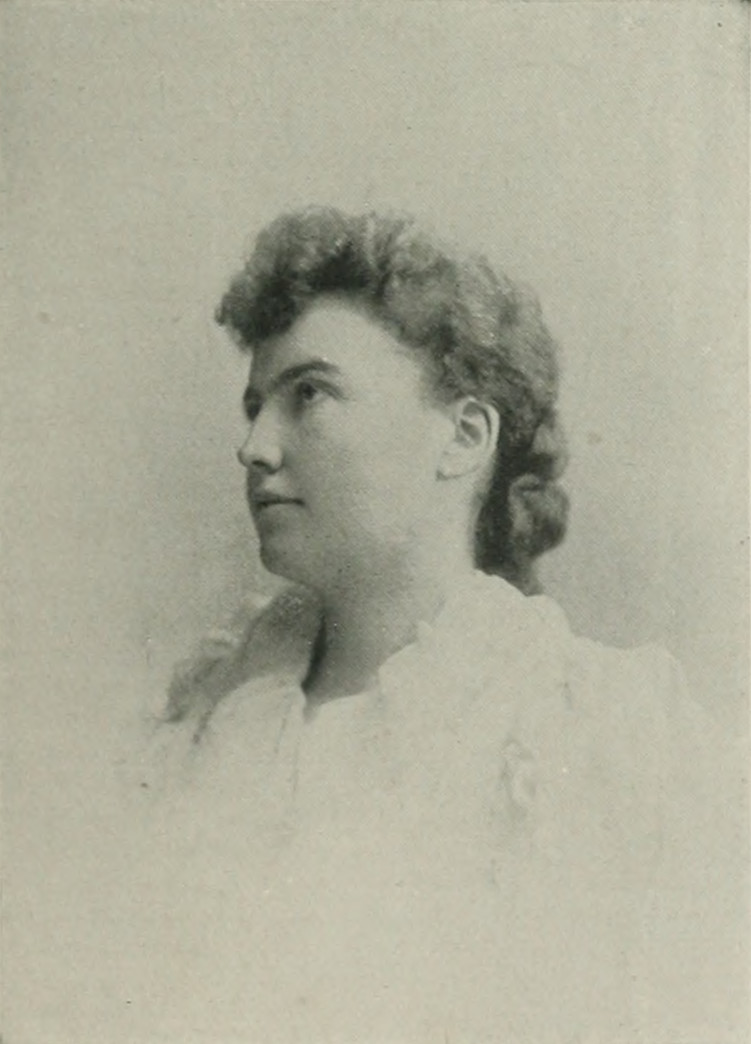
- Photo in A Woman of the Century
- Born: 1859; Minnesota
- Died: June 19/20, 1893; Manhattan, New York, U.S.
- Resting place: Woodlawn Cemetery, The Bronx, New York, U.S.
- Citizenship: American
- Occupations: Journalist, writer, translator, elocutionist
- Relatives: Arthur Wellesley, 1st Duke of Wellington
- Writing career
- Language: English
- Genre: juvenile literature

Margaret Manton Merrill (1859 – June 19/20, 1893) was a Minnesota-born American journalist, writer, translator, and elocutionist. At the age of twenty, she became the founder, owner and editor of the Colorado Temperance Gazette. She stayed in journalism for twelve years, where her noted successes were in the line of stories for children, while she likewise made translations from such diverse languages as Scandinavian and Sioux.

== Early life and education ==
Merrill was born in Wright County, Minnesota in 1857. Her brother was William Stiles, or William Chadwell of the Jesse James Gang. Her father was Elisha Stiles and her mother was Sarah E. Seely. Her mother died between 1857-1860 in Wright County, Minnesota. She was later adopted by her stepfather, Reverend Elisha Washington Merrill, who for forty years was a successful educator in the Northwest. Her mother was a grandniece of Sir Arthur Wellesley, 1st Duke of Wellington, and her grandmother on the maternal side was second-cousin to "Royal Charlie" of Scotland. In spite of her lineage, Merrill was very proud of the fact that she was an American.

Merrill enrolled in Carleton College in 1874 taking an English course. She only attended one semester, obtaining a grade of 8.25 on a 10 point scale. She later worked as a teacher in the Cannon Falls, Minnesota area. On August 10, 1875, she married Caleb Peterman. This marriage was soon annulled, and Merrill allegedly continued her studies at the University of Minnesota, from 1876 to 1877. However, the university has no records of her graduating or seeking a degree, with college records listing her age as 17 years and 3 months. Carleton College confirmed her birth date was recorded as September 14, 1857. On May 24, 1882 in Spring Valley, Minnesota, Merrill married Dr. Milton Davis and went on to attend the Women's Medical College in Chicago, Illinois.

== Career ==
In the fall of her eighteenth birthday, Merrill began her career as teacher, which vocation she continued for two years. Her taste for literary work led her to the journalistic field when she was 20 years old.

Going to Denveron in November 1879, Merrill became a partner of the Colorado Temperance Gazette, which was then the only temperance paper in the state. The venture was not successful, on account of the actions of a partner, and also because the anti-temperance spirit was too strong in Colorado for the prosperity of a paper wholly devoted to that cause. The 1880 Federal Census lists Merrill's occupation as a school teacher in Denver, Arapahoe County, Colorado. Later, during the temperance campaigns in Kansas and Iowa, she became a lecturer and organizer. She was successful in her education of children. In 1885, the Iowa State Census listed her living with Milton Davis in Tipton, Cedar Rapids County, Iowa.

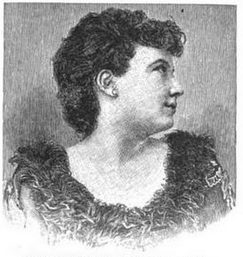
1891

In 1887, Merrill moved to New York City to do regular newspaper work. When the Woman's Press Club of New York City was organized, she was one of the charter members, and was elected the club's first secretary. She was a journalist of Sorosis, and a very active member of that organization. She then later worked for the New York Herald and was the only woman employed in that capacity by that journal. In addition, she did syndicate and miscellaneous work, being especially successful as a writer of children's stories.

During her vacations, Merrill was an extensive traveler. At the time of the famine in South Dakota, in 1889, she went through nineteen destitute counties in midwinter, visiting the homes of the people, and bringing back to her paper correct accounts of the condition of affairs there. The result was large contributions being sent from the East. During 1890, she visited Yellowstone Park and wrote accounts for papers in the West and in England, which attracted attention. While in California, she wrote a poem, entitled "The Faro Dealer's Story," which gained for her considerable local fame. Still later, she contemplated a work based on ancient Babylon.

After moving back to the United States, Merrill spent 35 years in Minnesota, Colorado, and California. She died June 19-20, 1893 in Manhattan, New York, and was buried at Woodlawn Cemetery, The Bronx, New York.
