= Hilda Muhlhauser Richards =

American government official

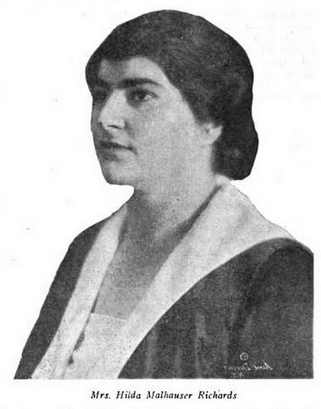
Hilda Muhlhauser Richards, from a 1918 publication

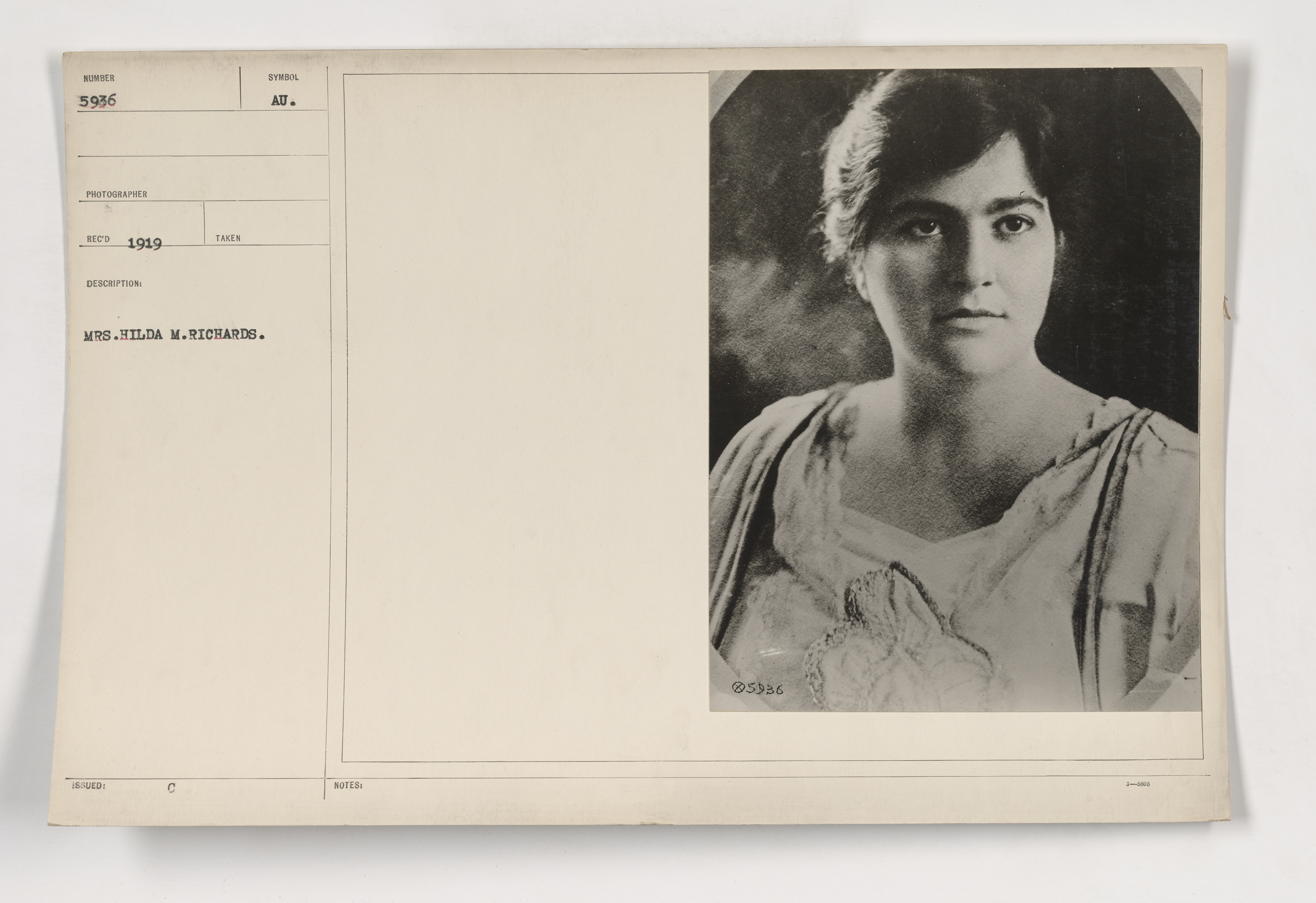
111-SC-5936 - Mrs. Hilda M. Richards - NARA - 55172782

Hilda Muhlhauser Richards (December 25, 1885 – February 26, 1924) was an American government official during World War I. She aimed to protect women's rights as chief of the Woman's Division of the Federal Employment Service in the United States Department of Labor.

== Early life ==
Richards was born in Cleveland, Ohio, the daughter of Frederick Mühlhauser and Antoinette Kahnheimer Mühlhauser. Her father, born in Switzerland, was the owner of the Northern Ohio Woolen Mills, and her mother was from Germany. As a young woman, inspired after a visit to Hull House, Hilda Muhlhauser worked in a settlement house in Cleveland.

== Career ==
In 1909, Hilda Muhlhauser spoke at a meeting of the Council of Jewish Women in Buffalo, about her work on the Council of Educational Alliance in Cleveland. She was head of the Girls' and Women's Employment Bureau in that city. She was on the board of the Consumers' League of Ohio, the Woman's Suffrage Association, and the Woman's City Club of Cleveland. Muhlhauser attended the Panama–Pacific International Exposition in 1915 as a representative on Cleveland.

In 1915, she was the only woman named to an advisory board of twelve national experts, to work on coordinating employment policy at federal, state, and municipal levels. She published a report on public employment bureaus during this time. She was vice president of the International Association of Public Employment Services from 1915 to 1917, focusing on the employment issues of women and girls.

In January 1918, Richards was appointed chief of the Woman's Division of the Federal Employment Service in the U. S. Department of Labor. Her policy positions included "equal pay for equal work" and the eight-hour work day. "We will protect the women hired to replace men from exploitation by unscrupulous employers," she explained of her division's wartime mission. She resigned her post in August 1918, after the program was reorganized. Her successor was Margaretta Neale.

In 1919, she wrote a syndicated newspaper column titled "Woman and her Job."

== Personal life ==
In 1917, Muhlhauser married professor Charles Russell Richards (1865–1936), director of Cooper Union.

She died in Sunny Bank Hospital, Cannes, France, of uremia.
