= United States Training and Dilution Service =

The United States Training and Dilution Service (USTDS) was an agency established during World War I to address racial segregation and labor shortages. It primarily focused on training and assimilating African American workers into the broader labor force while overcoming societal and racial barriers.

The term “dilution” referred to the practice of diluting skilled labor by bringing in semi-skilled or unskilled workers—especially African Americans—to fill the gaps created by the war effort. This service helped African Americans and other minority groups to receive training in various trades, thus allowing them to contribute to the workforce, especially in industries related to the war.
