= Ilya Denisov =

Russian Greek-Catholic priest

Archimandrite Ilya Denisov (22 January 1893 in Saint Petersburg, Russian Empire – 7 September 1971 in Chicago, United States) was a Russian Greek-Catholic priest.

== Biography ==
Ilya Denisov was born on 22 January 1893 in Saint Petersburg in a Cossack family of Russian Orthodox religion. He studied at the Saint Petersburg, Novocherkassk and Germany (1910 - 1912). He worked as a clerk at Large of the Ministry of Internal Affairs of Russia . After the October Revolution, emigrated to Constantinople. Then through Bulgaria, Hungary and Austria got to Paris, where he converted to Catholicism. Denisov studied at the Catholic Institute of Paris. He studied philosophy, theology and history. In 1943 he defended his doctorate in philosophy and in 1946 in theology. In 1948 Denisov moved to the United States. He taught at the University of Notre Dame and Saint Procopius College in Lisle. In 1962 he became a Melkite priest. He served some time in the Holy Land, was then rector of the Catholic Church in Chicago. Father Denisov died on September 7, 1971, in Chicago and was buried in the Benedictine monastery of Saint Procopius in Lisle, Illinois, US.

== Sources ==
L'Eglise russe vis-a-vis thomiste. - Louvain, 1936.

Maxime le Grec et l'Occident: Contribution a histoire de la pensee religieuse et philosophique de Michel Trivolis. - Louvain, 1943.

Descartes: The First Theoretician of Mathematical Physics. - Chicago, 1970.

The Catholic Encyclopedia. T. 1. - M., 2002. pp. 1594–1585.
