= Jean Stevenson =

New Zealand community worker and administrator

Jean Stevenson (1881–1948) was a New Zealand community worker and administrator. She became General Secretary of New Zealand's YWCA association and was an advocate for women. She was born in Dunedin, New Zealand in 1881.
