= Jennie Lozier =

American physician

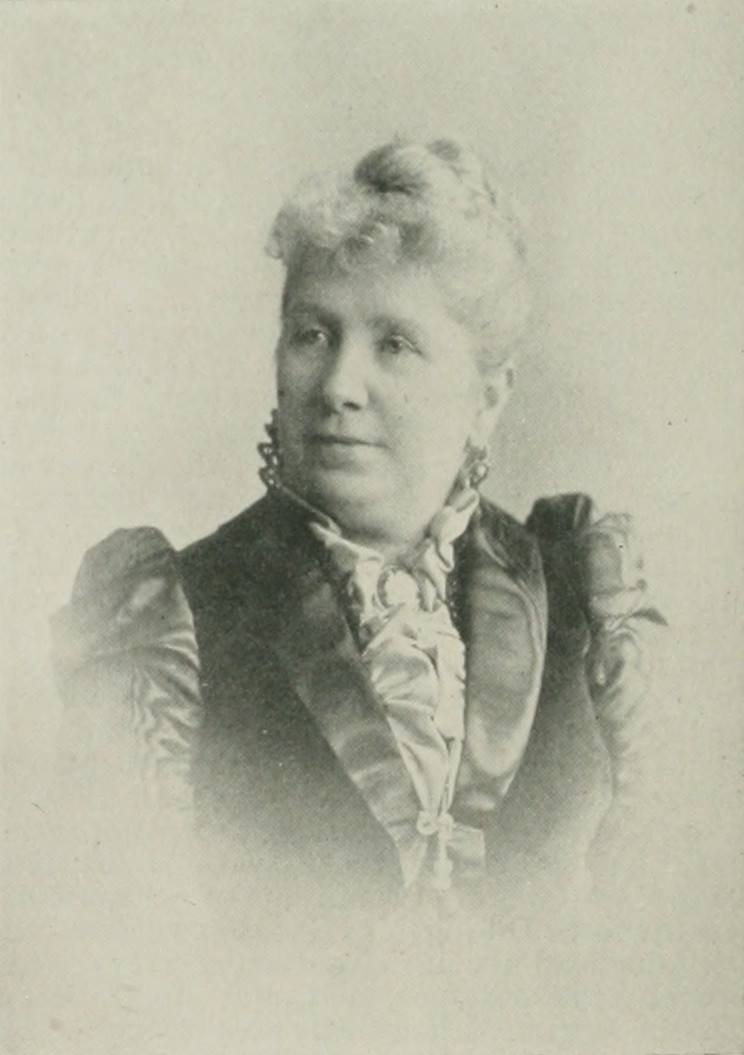
- Portrait of Jennie de la Montagnie Lozier from A Woman of the Century
- Born: Jeanne de la Montagnie Lozier c. 1841; New York, U.S.
- Died: 1915; Staten Island, New York, U.S.
- Education: Rutgers Female Institute (Doctor of Science 1891); New York Medical College (Doctor of Medicine)
- Occupations: physician, educator
- Relatives: Clemence S. Lozier (mother-in-law)

Jeanne de la Montagnie Lozier (c. 1841 – August 6, 1915) was an American physician and educator from New York City. She worked as an instructor of languages and literature in Hillsdale College from the age of nineteen, and after earning her medical degree from New York Medical College, became a professor of physiology. She was a delegate to the International Homoeopathic Congress in Paris in 1889 and was president of Sorosis Club from 1891 to 1894.

== Early life and education ==
Jeanne "Jennie" de la Montagnie was born in New York in 1841 or circa 1850 and was a lifelong resident of that city. Her father was William de la Montagnie, Jr. Her ancestors were Dutch and French Huguenots who settled there as early as 1633. Born and raised in the old seventh ward of New York, she received an extensive, liberal education, which included languages and science. In her early adulthood, she matriculated at Rutgers Female Institute (later Rutgers Female College), of which she became a trustee and at which she earned a Doctor of Science degree in 1891.

== Career ==
=== Medical career ===
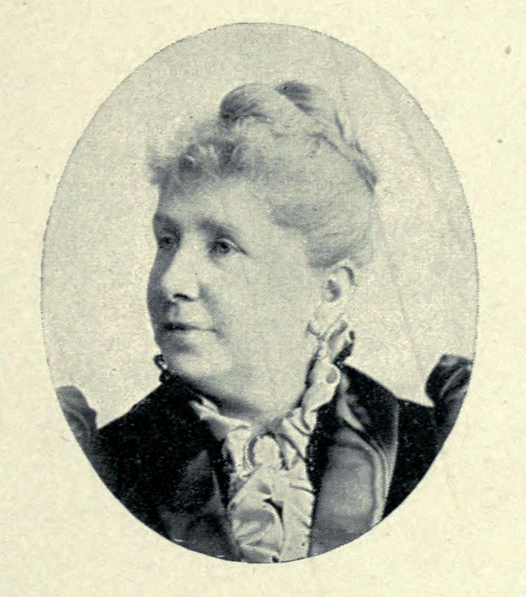
Portrait of Lozier circa 1894

After graduating from Rutgers Female Institute, Lozier traveled in the West Indies. When she was nineteen years old, she began teaching language and literature at Hillsdale College in Hillsdale, Michigan. Thereafter, she was elected vice principal of the college's women's department. Returning to New York in 1872, she married widower Abraham Witton Lozier, the father of two children and the only son of her lifelong friend Clemence S. Lozier.

Lozier became interested in medicine through her mother-in-law, Clemence S. Lozier, the founder and long-term dean of the New York Medical College and Hospital for Women. Lozier became a Doctor of Medicine shortly after giving birth to her first and only biological child. She then became a professor of physiology at her alma mater and served on the hospital’s staff. After twelve years, she retired from the profession and devoted herself to domestic, social and educational interests.

In 1889, New York Medical College sent Lozier to Paris as a delegate to the International Homeopathic Congress. She presented a paper in French on the medical education of women in the United States, which was printed in full in the subsequent congressional transactions.

=== Club memberships ===
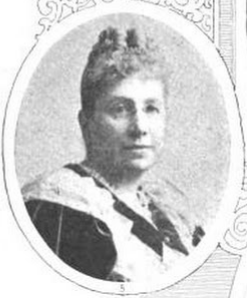
Jennie de la Montagnie Lozier, 1898

Just before her retirement, Lozier was invited by the Sorosis Club to give a lecture on "Physical Culture." Sorosis then extended her membership, and Lozier became prominent in the club's councils. In Sorosis, she served as chairman of the committee on science, chairman of the committee on philanthropy, and a corresponding secretary. She was elected the club’s president in 1891 and 1892. In May 1892, Lozier represented Sorosis as a delegate to the biennial council of the Federation of Women's Clubs in Chicago. There, she read a paper on the "Educational Influence of Women's Clubs."

Lozier was also the president of two other clubs: the Emerson, a club of men and women belonging to R. Heber Newton's church, of which she was a member, and the Avon, was a fortnightly drawing-room club. Additionally, she was a member of the science committee of the Association for the Advancement of Women and of the Patria Club. She read papers before various literary and reform associations in and near New York City.

== Private life ==
Lozier's family, consisting of her husband, two sons, and one daughter, spent their summers on Great South Bay, Long Island, in a villa named "Windhurst." Her husband, A.W. Lozier, would later give up his practice to engage in the real-estate and building business in New York. Their winter home was located on 78th Street.

She studied literature and art and advocated for more liberal education for women. As she had done, she wanted other women to be able to study art, music, chemistry, social economics, psychology, pedagogy, and physiology.

== Death ==
Jennie de la Montagnie Lozier died at her summer home in New Brighton, Staten Island, on August 6, 1915.
