= Josephine Pollard =

American poet

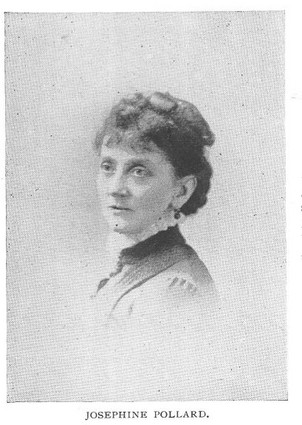
- Born: October 10, 1834; New York City, New York
- Died: August 15, 1892 (aged 57); New York City, New York
- Occupations: Writer and poet
- Known for: Christian hymns

Josephine Pollard (J. P. Pollard) (17 October 1834 – 15 August 1892) was an American hymn writer, author and poet.

Pollard published over a hundred hymns, and wrote numerous popular children's books mostly on religious and historical topics. She worked as an editor for the Sunday School Times and worked for the Methodist Book Concern, where she edited a magazine intended for African Americans. Pollard also wrote for other children's magazines such as The Little Corporal. Her poetry was published in a number of magazines including Harper's Magazine and Scribner's Magazine, as well as the New York Ledger. Some of her children's poetry was collected in the book Elfin land published in 1882.

In her children's books she neither talked over the child's head nor down to it in tones of condescension. Her works have seen a recent resurgence as early readers, spurred by the home-school movement.

Pollard was born in New York City one of seven children of architect Calvin Pollard and his wife Electra. She attended the Spingler Institute, an exclusive girls' school. Pollard was a lifelong member of the Presbyterian Church, and attended the North Presbyterian Church on Ninth Avenue. She was a founding member of the professional women's club Sorosis. She never married. Josephine Pollard died in New York City after a long illness on 15 August 1892.

== Selected works ==
=== Children's books ===
Her children's books included:

- Christopher Columbus and the Discovery of the New World in Words of One Syllable (1892)
- Bible Stories for Children (1899)
- History of The Old Testament in Words of One Syllable (1899)
- History of The New Testament in Words of One Syllable (1899)
- The Life of Christ for Young People (Young folks' life of Jesus Christ)
- The Life of Washington, A Child's History of America: Told in One-Syllable Words
- The History of the United States Told in One Syllable Words (1884)

=== Hymns ===
Among the most popular of her hymns were:

- Beyond the sunset's radiant glow, There is a brighter world, I know
- I have work enough to do, Ere the sun goes down
- I stood outside the gate
- Joybells ringing, children singing
- There are lights by the shore of that country
- 'Tis the Savior who would claim entrance to your heart also known as Let the Savoir In

=== Poetry ===
Pollard's poems include:

- The Brave Little Tailor
- The Price of a Drink
- A Vagrant
