= Association for the Advancement of Women =

Association for the Advancement of Women (A.A.W.) was an American women's organization founded in 1873.

The organization was the outcome of a call issued by Sorosis in May 1868, for a Congress of Women to be held in New York City that autumn, and the object of the Association, as adopted by the first Congress, was "to receive and present practical methods for securing to women higher intellectual, moral and physical conditions, and thereby to improve all domestic and social relations." The history of this Association, with its annual congresses for the succeeding 30 years, is the history of the realization of its lofty aim, to arouse thought along many lines, science, art, education, philosophy, ethics, political and social science, industrial training. Many eminent women were connected with it, but it is interesting to notice in the reports of the congresses the reiteration of the phrase,— "Mrs. Howe in the chair." For many years she was president.

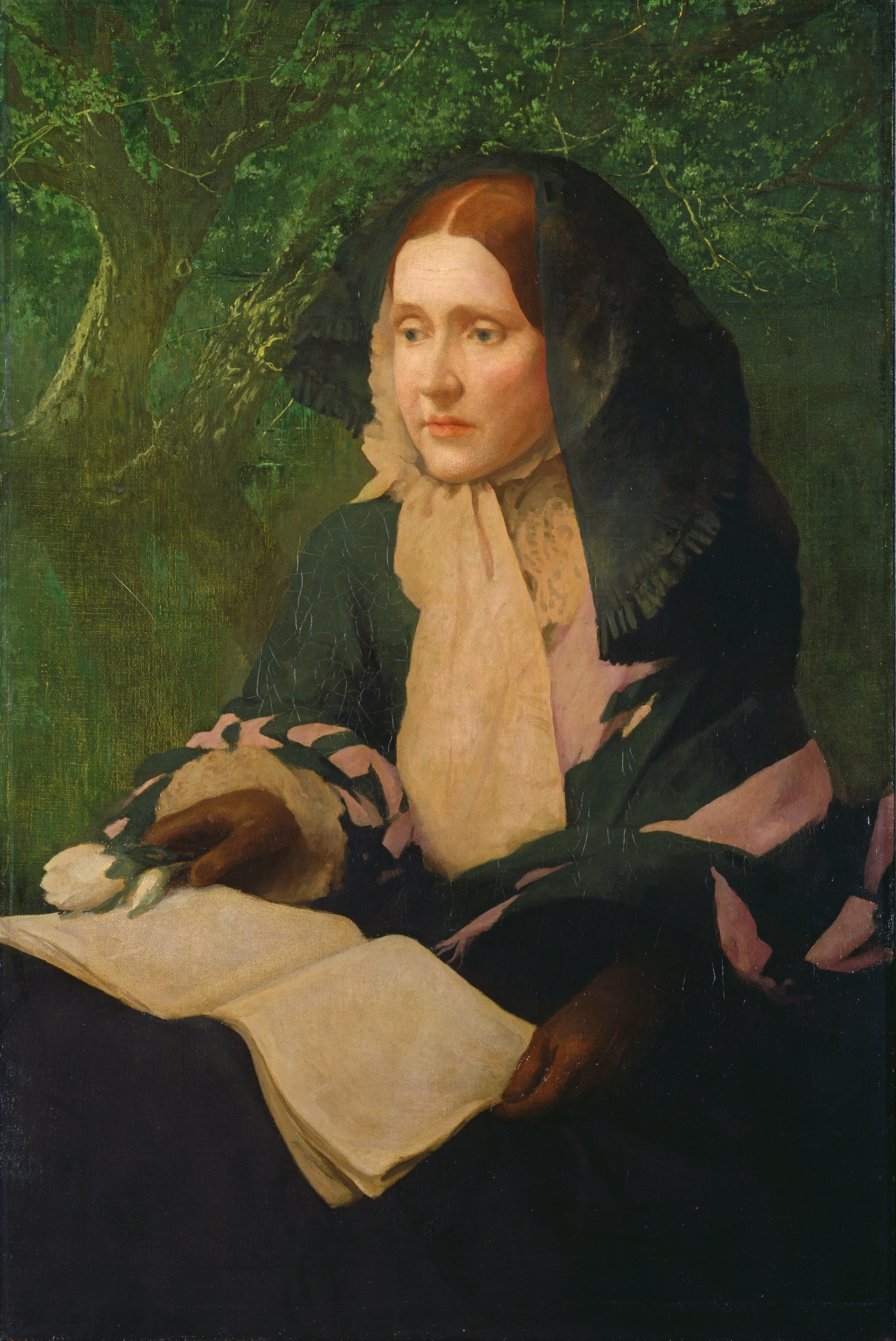
Julia Ward Howe

The Association was organized at the very beginning of the club movement, to interest the women of the country in matters of high thought and in all undertakings found to be useful to society, and to promote their efficiency in these through sympathetic acquaintance and co-operation. It had a number of distinguished presidents and held congresses in many States, which almost invariably led to the formation of local clubs for study and mutual improvement, as well as to good works in other lines. Among the cities in which a congress was held were New York, Syracuse, Buffalo, Cleveland, Detroit, Chicago, Des Moines, Denver, Madison, St. Paul, Toronto, Baltimore, Memphis, Knoxville, Louisville, Atlanta, and New Orleans. Many distinguished women were included in its membership and it had a strong influence in rendering possible the extensive formation of the women's clubs which became so important a feature in American society. Its work was partly chronicled in two large volumes which gave the papers presented and action taken at the meetings. By 1902, the many great organizations of women which had been established made further work on the part of the A.A.W. unnecessary.

== Establishment ==
Several women sought to organize broader cooperation among American women who were working independently in emerging areas of labor and reform. Their early efforts are not well documented, but later accounts indicate that Sorosis played a central role in establishing more formal coordination.

At a regular meeting of Sorosis, on April 21, 1873, it was proposed by the executive committee to hold a Woman's Congress in the following October, under the auspices of Sorosis, for the promotion of more perfect cooperation and good fellowship among women engaged in kindred objects and pursuits.

At a social meeting held June 2, Charlotte Beebe Wilbour (1833–1914), President, recommended that Sorosis address a circular letter to practical representative women interested in higher education, and all questions of like importance to women. She suggested that those best-fitted might prepare papers to be read, that resolutions on practical subjects relating to the welfare of women might be offered, discussed and acted upon, and that mutual counsel and help might be rendered.

It was voted that the Call be issued in July, for a Congress to be held in October.

On August 25, a meeting of the executive committee was convened. The Committee felt encouraged to proceed with the arrangements for the proposed Congress. Wilbour suggested that means be taken to solicit letters from all earnest women, especially from those struggling in obscurity for the right. It was voted that the Call express the desire to form an Association for the Advancement of Woman, and that numbers shall not be the object of the Congress, but the gathering of the earnest few who shall constitute a deliberative assembly, to confer concerning the best interests of their sex.

On September 1, 1873, the following Call was issued: To MEET a pressing demand for interchange of thought and harmony of action among women interested in the advancement of their own sex, we issue this call for a Congress of Women, to be held in the City of New York. At this Conference we hope to found an Association for the Advancement of Women, at the annual gatherings of which shall be presented the best ideas and the most advantageous methods of our foremost thinkers and writers. Therefore, we solicit the presence or responsive word of all accordant associations of women—of women Preachers, Teachers, Professors, Physicians, Artists, Lawyers, Trading Capitalists, Editors, Authors, and practical Philanthropists, those who by their example inspire others not only to covet earnestly the best gifts, but to labor earnestly for them. In this first gathering we are already assured of the attendance and best efforts of a goodly number of the pre-eminently talented, cultivated and beneficent women who, by means of higher education, broader fields of industry, better laws, artistic and scientific pursuits, business discipline, and an enlightened motherhood, hope to remove the sources of misery, and cure the evils that so many of our benevolent women spend their lives in ameliorating. Those whose names are appended to this Call will constitute the first membership. Application for membership may be made to any signer of this Call. A preliminary meeting of members only will be held on Tuesday, October 14. The hour and place of this meeting, and of the subsequent sessions, which will occupy the three following days, will be advertised in the daily papers.

Subjects for papers and discussion included:

- Enlightened Motherhood
- The Inviolate Homestead
- The Household
- Equitable Monetary Division between Husband and Wife
- The Relation of Woman to her Dress
- Higher Education for Woman
- Co-Education of the Sexes
- Woman In Literature: Editor, Author, Speaker
- Woman As Teacher and Professor
- Woman in Art and Science
- Woman in the Medical, Surgical and Legal Professions
- Industries and Co-operative Industries among Women
- Woman's Work in Philanthropy, Prison Reform, Temperance, Peace, Institutions of Charity, and Charitable Societies.
- Woman in the Church and Pulpit
- Law, as it affects Woman
- Woman's Place in Government

On September 26, the Committee reported a hearty response to the Call from all parts of the country far exceeding their expectations, and that the class of women who had given their names for this work, warrant the Committee in believing that the movement is destined to be a grand success; that its deliberations will be earnest and intelligent, and will be conducted in such a calm, rational, temperate and Christian spirit as to compel the respect of the world at large. It was voted that Sorosis donate US$100 toward the expenses of the Congress. Voted, also, that a subscription list be opened to assist in defraying expenses. Local Committee reported that Wilbour had written, to date, 160 letters, dictated 40, had sent 150 Messengers and 200 Calls; the Secretary had written 280 letters to women in. the United States and in Europe, had sent about 700 Messengers and Calls; Mrs. Poole had written 80 letters, making a total of 1,620 letters, Messengers and Calls sent out.

== Early history ==
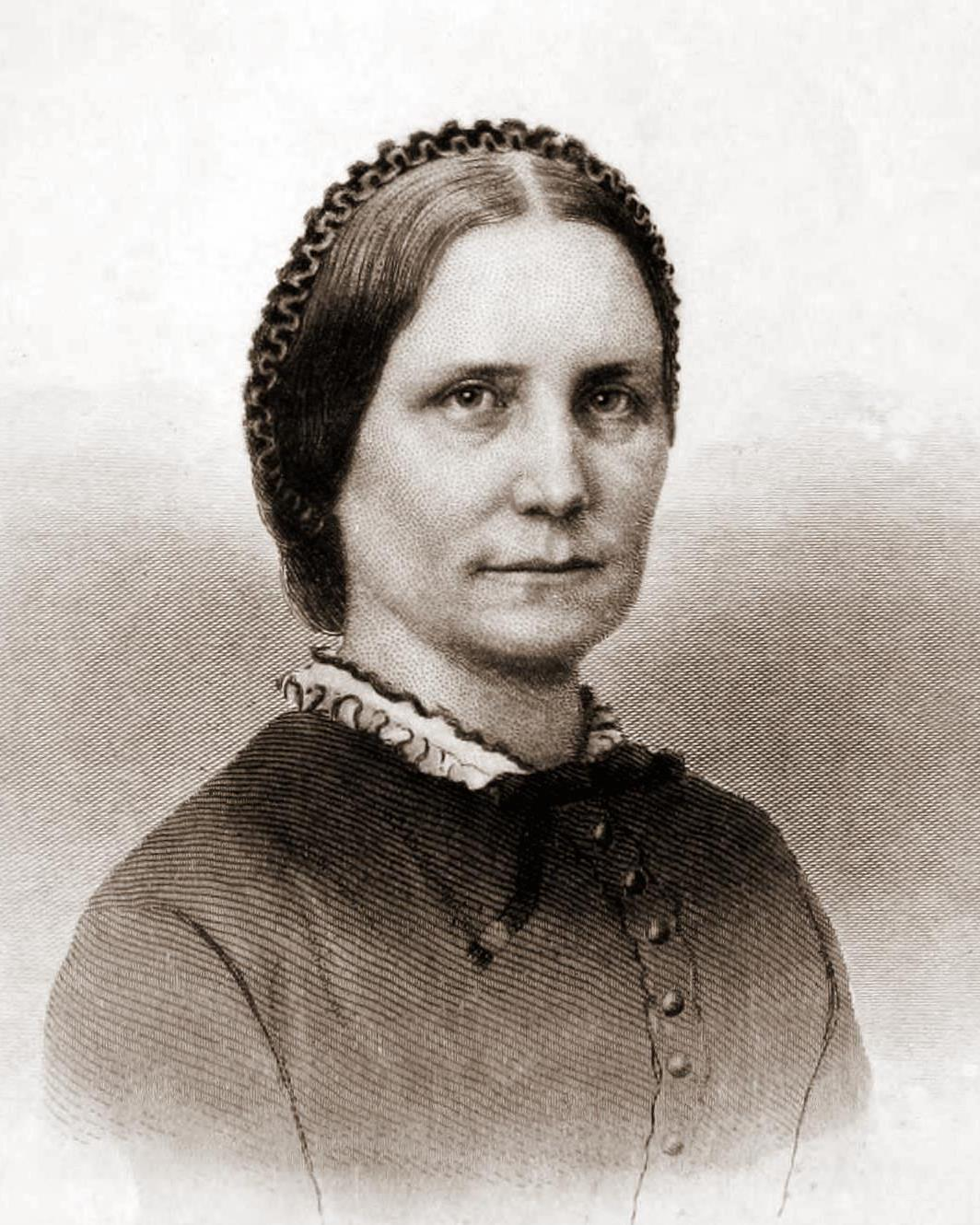
Mary Ashton Rice Livermore

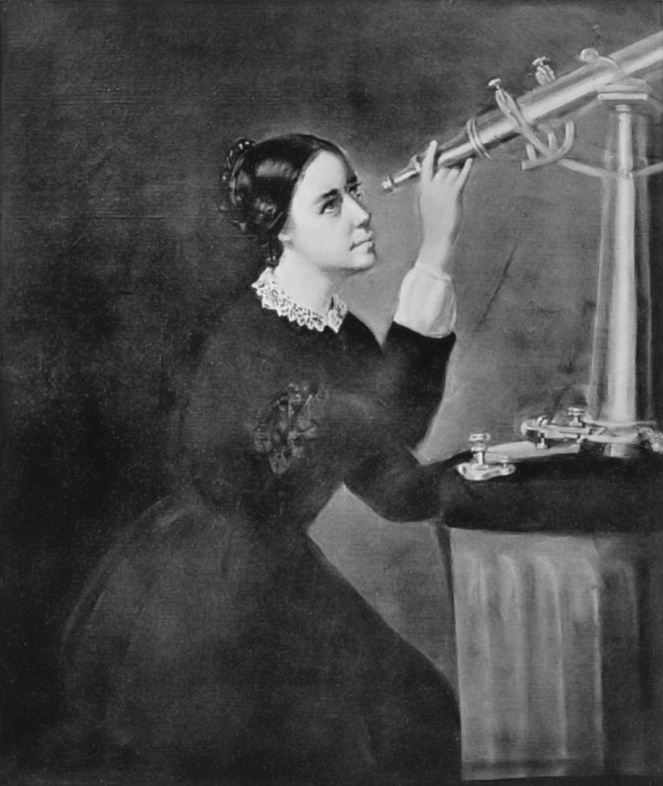
Maria Mitchell

The First Congress was held at the Union League Theatre, New York, on October 15–17, 1873. Mary A. Livermore was elected president. The Second Congress was held at Chicago, October 15–17, 1874 and Prof. Maria Mitchell, of Vassar College was elected president. The Third Congress was held at Syracuse, New York, October 13–15, 1875 and Prof. Mitchell was re-elected president. One of the first treasurers was Sophia Curtiss Hoffman.

By the 1880 Congress, the value of the Association was more and more seen to consist in the skilled, but impromptu discussion after each paper, and in the real importance of the Executive Sessions, where each State, through its representative, made known its educational and social progress during the year. Thus, there was an intercommunication of knowledge that aided in creating a national feeling of rejoicing at the welfare of other States. The Congress developed obedience to parliamentary law, patriotic sentiment, and general knowledge of American philanthropy in its many practical phases.
