= Wilbour Plaque =

Ancient Egyptian artifact

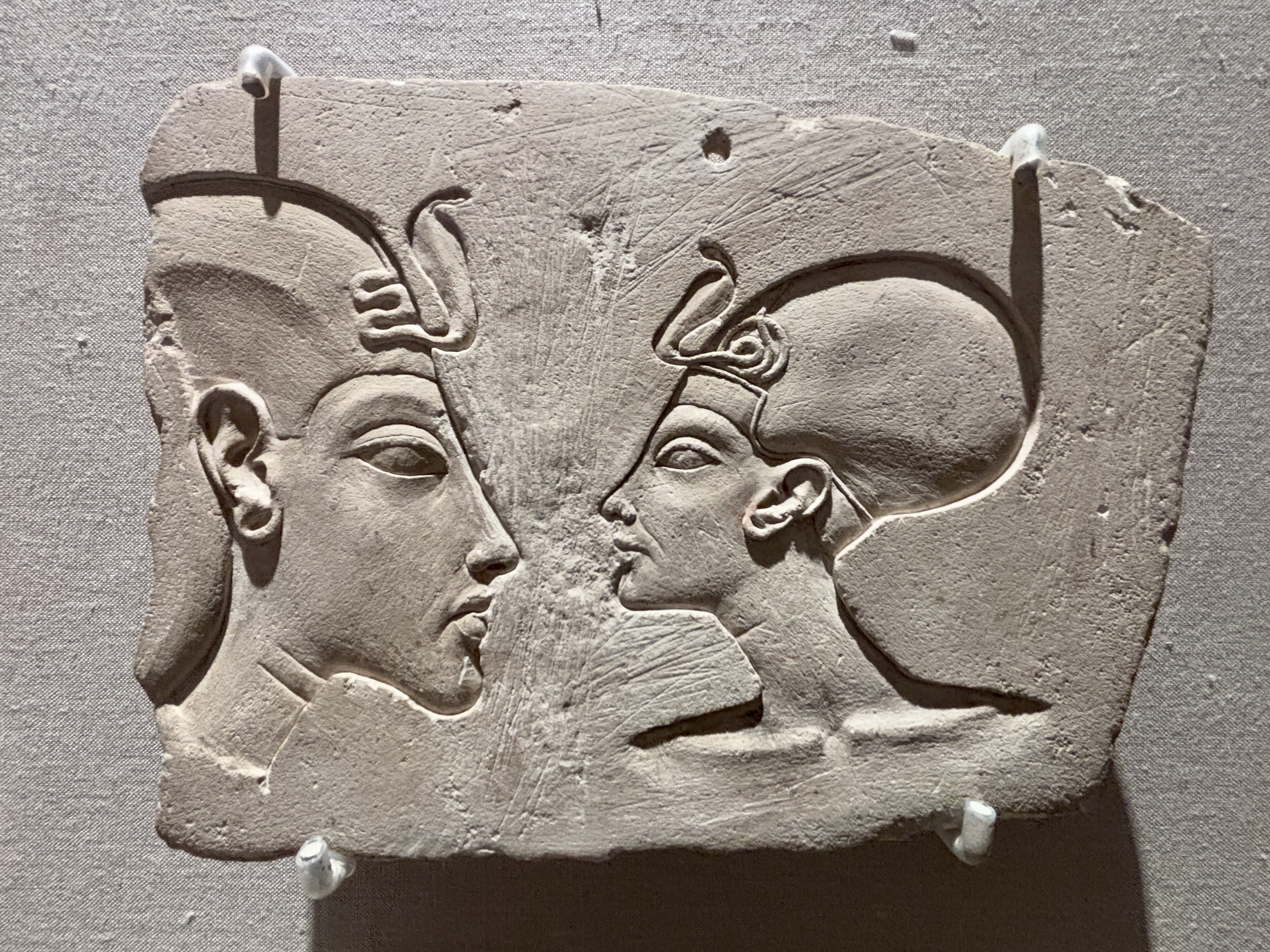
- Material: Limestone
- Length: 22.1 cm
- Height: 15.7 cm
- Created: c. 1345 BC
- Discovered: 1881; Egypt
- Discovered by: Charles Wilbour
- Present location: Brooklyn Museum, New York, United States

The Wilbour Plaque is an Ancient Egyptian artifact from the Amarna Period (c. 1352–1336 BC). Currently housed in the Brooklyn Museum, the plaque is named after Charles Wilbour, an American Egyptologist who acquired it in 1881 during his explorations in Egypt.

The plaque is carved in sunk relief and depicts Nefertiti on the right, wearing the cap crown, and most likely Amenhotep IV on the left, wearing the khat headdress. The plaque is believed to have been used as a reference for sculptors to use to depict royalty.

== See also ==
- Media related to Wilbour Plaque at Wikimedia Commons
