= R. Belle Colver =

American journalist

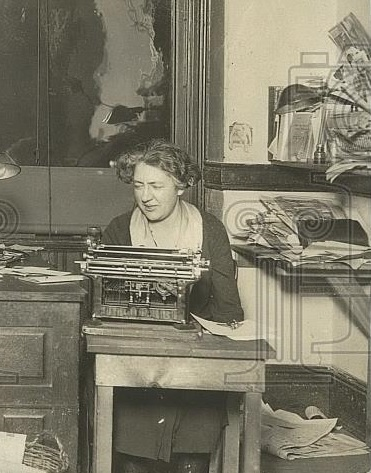
1923 Press Photo Newspaper SR Editorial Belle Colver

Rhoda Belle Colver (October 3, 1882 - January 24, 1977) was the Club Editor of The Spokesman-Review in Spokane.

== Early life ==
Rhoda Belle Colver was born in Missouri Valley, Iowa, on October 3, 1882, the daughter of James E. and Emma O. Colver.

== Career ==
R. Belle Colver was the Club Editor of The Spokesman-Review. In those days women were sent to cover only women's club activities and social events.

Colver was a delegate to the Biennial National YWCA Convention in New York during 1924.

Colver was the author of "Women of Shakespeare and the Women of the Bible", "Of such stuff are dreams, a one-act play" (1950) and "Nature's wondrous way: selections from poetic verse" (1965).

As Mowbray Arnold, Colver wrote "Waiilaptu days" (1938).

She was a member of: Spokane Sorosis, Woman's Club of Spokane, Shakespearean Study, American Association of University Women.

== Personal life ==
R. Belle Colver moved to Spokane, Washington, in 1908 and lived at 811 E. Walton Ave., Spokane, Washington.
