= Virgie McFarland =

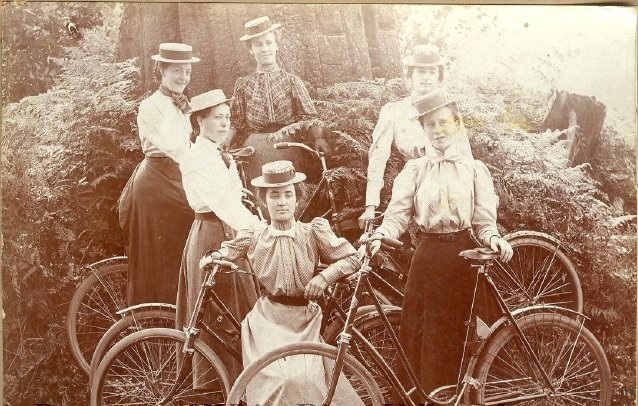
Top Row: Virgie Smith McFarland, Clara Triplet Monroe, Nell Wood Guiberson. Front row: Alice Smith Farnsworth, Carrie Short Crow, Nell Ramsay

Virgie Belle Smith McFarland (1877 – January 24, 1971) was instrumental in establishing the first Aberdeen Women's Exchange in 1918.

== Early life ==
Virgie Belle Smith McFarland was born in 1877 in Keosauqua, Iowa, the daughter of William Dixon Smith (1819-1911) and Ruth E. Maple (1839-1923).

== Career ==
She was an educator and wrote articles and stories for eastern syndicate.

She was instrumental in establishing the first Aberdeen Women's Exchange in 1918.

She was chairman of the Playfield Commission.

She was a member of the Harbor Civic Club, Sorosis Club and Writers Club.

== Personal life ==
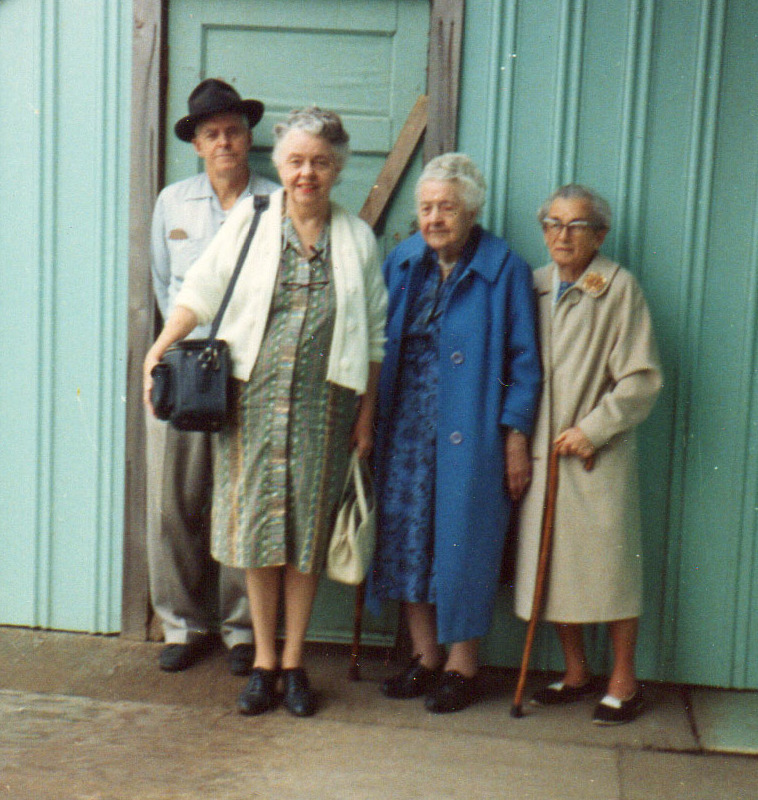
Left to Right: Virgil McFarland, Ruth McFarland Puphal, Virgie Smith McFarland and Theresa Polexine Daub Moon

Virgie McFarland moved to Washington in 1888 and lived in Aberdeen, Washington. She married George Mcfarland (1870-1943) and had four children, Ruth Puphal, Frank, Virgil George McFarland (1902-1973), Elizabeth "Betty".

She died on January 24, 1971, and is buried at Fern Hill Cemetery, also located in Aberdeen, Washington.
