= Sophia Curtiss Hoffman =

American philanthropist (1825–1905)

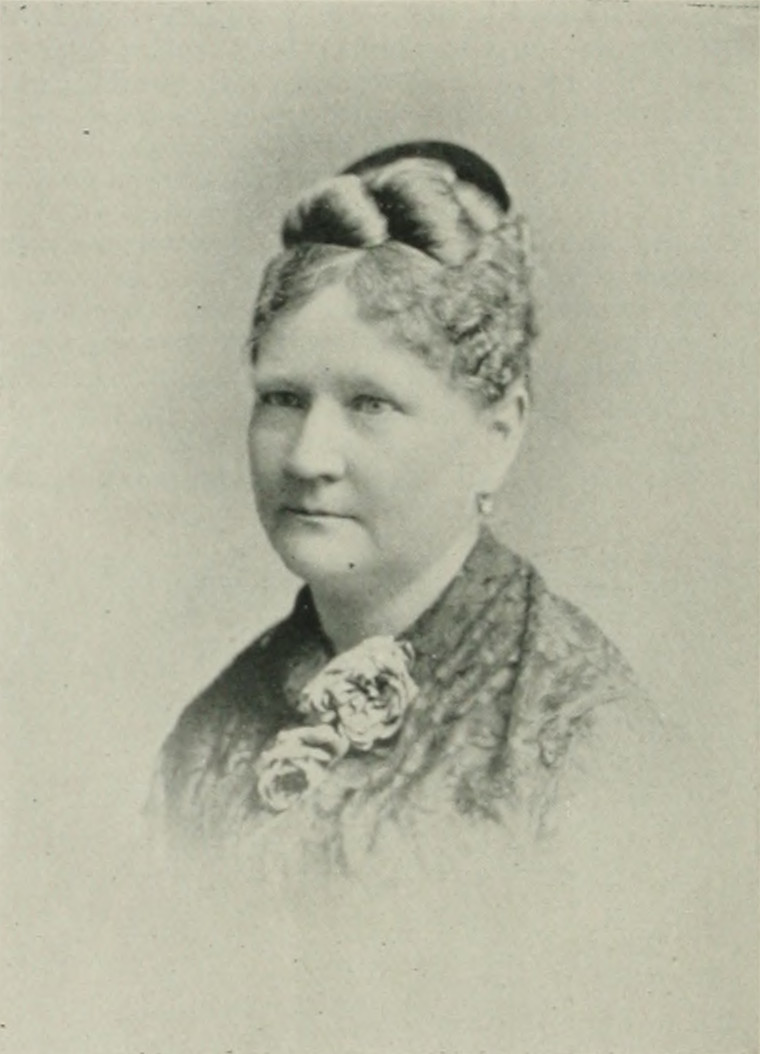
- "A Woman of the Century"
- Born: Sophia Curtiss; 1825; Sheffield, Massachusetts, USA
- Died: September 12, 1905; New Rochelle, New York, USA
- Other names: Mrs. George Hoffman
- Occupation: philanthropist
- Known for: Chapin Home for the Aged

Sophia Curtiss Hoffman (née, Curtiss; also known as, Mrs. George Hoffman; 1825 – September 12, 1905) was an American philanthropist, known as the Helen Gould of the early 1870s. She was the founder of the benevolent institution known as the Chapin Home for the Aged, in New York City. She was also numbered among the reformers, as one of the first treasurers of the Association for the Advancement of Women, and a vice-president of the Woman's Centenary Association of the Universalist Church.

== Early life and education ==
Sophia Curtiss was born in Sheffield, Massachusetts, in 1825.

She was educated in the girls' academy at Great Barrington, Massachusetts.

== Career ==
Known before widowhood as Mrs. George Hoffman, her name, thus given, appeared in the list of incorporators of the Chapin Home, a benevolent institution of that city. In fact, it is to Hoffman the inception of the home came as a sort of inspiration, and she gave at various times thousands of dollars to promote its beneficent aims. In Hoffman's early life, an invalid aunt, by her own suffering with a sense of dependence, impressed upon Hoffman's mind the importance of a home where aged women, who had been accustomed to the comforts of a competence in earlier days, could feel independent, at the same time that they were made comfortable; and she promised this relative that, if ever the means were in her possession, she would seek to establish such a retreat. The Chapin Home was the outgrowth of that experience. As the years rolled on, the dream of her childhood became a reality, and with the cooperation of her husband, Hoffman made the first contributions to the new enterprise, and then worked to obtain co-laborers, that the home might be established and occupied. It was to be wholly unsectarian, and was so incorporated, though it was to bear the name of a widely-known Universalist preacher, Edwin Hubbell Chapin, who had been for many years Hoffman's pastor. The first annual report of this charity mentions that the first meeting of friends interested in the enterprise was held on February 1, 1869, in the basement of Dr. Chapin's church, New York, but prior to that several private meetings had been held in Hoffman's parlors, and the corner-stone of the brick edifice was laid by Hoffman hersels. The Chapin Home is especially her work, as from early youth she had planned such a charity. While in Europe, she visited many such homes in Great Britain and on the continent, that she might study their methods and develop a plan for a self-sustaining and permanent institution.

Hoffman proved herself also the friend of struggling genius, for it was in her residence on Fifth Avenue that the operatic favorite, Emma Abbott, was introduced to the public of New York, and thus advanced on her career. US$500 of the money subscribed in order that Abbott might receive instruction in Europe came from Hoffman, and it was through her instrumentality that the voice of the future prima donna was secured for the choir of Dr. Chapin's church, before she entered fully upon her public career. Still preserved by some of Abbott's friends, as a memento, was a card with the words, "Charity Entertainment, in aid of the Chapin Home Fund, at the house of Mrs. George Hoffman. No. 599 Fifth Avenue. On Tuesday evening, February 21st, 1871. At eight o'clock. Tickets #5.00; Admitting Two." The check for $500.00 given to the treasurer, D. D. T. Marshall, represented the first actual cash procured as funds for the Chapin Home, and this card also represented the date when Emma Abbott was first seen and heard by a New York audience. It was the stepping-stone to her success, and the first round also of the ladder by which the Chapin Home attained its permanency and prosperity.

== Personal life ==
When she was 20 years old, she married George Hoffman, a farmer of Claverack, New York, who later was successful in the real estate business in New York City. The couple had two children, a daughter, Katherine, and a son, Curtiss.

Hoffman resided in New York City. As a member of many notable organizations, and often acting in an official capacity, she was widely known in the U.S. Wherever the Woman's Congress, the Association for the Advancement of Women, the name of its early treasurer and active member was familiar. She had been a valued member of Sorosis for nearly as long as it has existed, and was usually in office or prominent as the reader of a paper, or a speaker in the discussions which occurred on the sixial days. She was considered one of the leaders of the fashionable set.

In the panic of 1872, the husband lost most of his fortune. He died three years. When her daughter married, Hoffman went to live with her and thereafter lived in retirement.

Having been ill for more than a year, Sophia Curtiss Hoffman died at the home of her daughter in New Rochelle, New York, September 12, 1905. Once the possessor of a fortune, she died comparatively poor. Her only possession out of a once stately property in real estate was a small cottage in Manhattan.
