= Ella Dietz =

American poet (1847–1920)

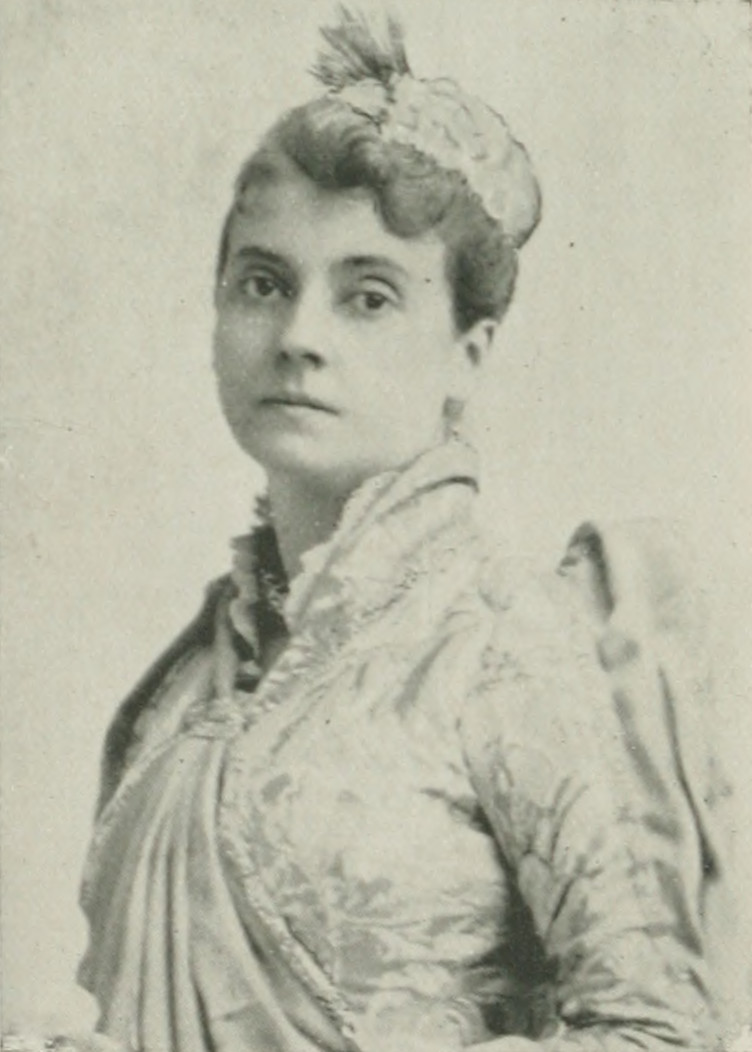
- Photo in A Woman of the Century
- Born: Ella Maria Dietz; January 27, 1847; New York City, New York, US
- Died: January 9, 1920 (aged 72); Greater London, England
- Education: Cottage Hill Seminary
- Occupations: actress; author
- Spouses: Edward M. Clymer (m. 1864); Webster Glynes (m. 1898)
- Relatives: Linda Dietz (sister), Hiester Clymer (brother-in-law)
- Writing career
- Pen name: Ella Dietz
- Genres: poetry; prose; non-fiction

Ella Dietz (née, Dietz; after first marriage, Clymer, after second marriage, Glynes; pen and stage name, Ella Dietz; January 27, 1847 – January 9, 1920) was an American actress and author. Professionally known by her maiden name, Ella Dietz, she was a writer of poems and songs, an instructor in elocution and dramatic art, a reader, and a reciter for charitable events. In the United States, she served as the fifth president of Sorosis, vice-president of the National Council of Women, and was a leading member of the Advisory Board of The Federation of Clubs. To the British public, she was well-known for her histrionic abilities, having acted leading roles in over thirty plays in London during the period of 1874 to 1881. She was also skilled as an artist with pencil and brush.

== Early life and education ==
Ella Maria Dietz was born in New York City, January 27, 1847 (or 1856). She was the daughter of William Henry and Frances Virginia (Robinson) Dietz, granddaughter of John and Sophia (Meinell) Dietz, and great-granddaughter of John Dietz. who emigrated from Strasbourg, Alsace, to New York prior to 1776. She was educated at the Cottage Hill Seminary, Poughkeepsie, New York. On the death of her father, she returned to New York City to assist her mother in her school, the first kindergarten ever established in New York. She wanted to be an actress, but as her mother opposed, she studied drawing and painting instead, along with voice.

== Career ==
=== Actress ===
On June 24, 1864, at the age of seventeen, she married Edward Myers Clymer (1822–1883), of Pennsylvania, brother of Hiester Clymer, who was a member of Congress for several years. Her early marriage changed the course of her life, and she attempted to obtain a divorce. Domestic duties, mingled with travel at home and abroad, occupied the next few years. Her winters were passed in studying with the best masters of drawing, elocution and music. After the birth of her only child, changing circumstances made her face the necessity of choosing a profession and she resolved to overcome opposition and became a dramatic artist.

Clymer made her professional debut in New York, in 1871 or 1872, as Pauline in The Lady of Lyons. In the spring of 1874, accompanied by her brother and her sister, the actress, Linda Dietz, Clymer went to France to study at the Conservatoire de Paris and to act at the Haymarket, London, and in surrounding areas. Clymer translated and adapted plays, some of which were produced by a company of her own organizing. In 1880, she helped form "The Church and Stage Guild". Her performances as an actress and dramatic reader of the principal Shakespearean parts were highly commended. It was said that her Juliet was "a revelation, poetical and imaginative in the highest degree." She appeared as Ophelia, Portia, Desdemona, and as Helena in a special revival of Midsummer Night's Dream. In 1881, she brought out a version of Faust, adapted by herself for the English stage, in which she played Margaret.

With a London company, Dietz toured in Romeo and Juliet, As you like it, Lady Clancarty, and a new version of Faust and Marguerite, which she adapted for the English stage. The Court Circular of February 12, 1881, wrote that:

A furore has just been created in the North by the production of a new English version of Goethe's 'Faust'. Miss Ella Dietz is the authoress; and with true insight into the spirit of the world-famed original, and poetic talents of a very high order, she has succeeded in accomplishing that which has hitherto seemed an impossibility—viz., a dramatic version of 'Faust' for England, one that, while keeping to the spirit of the great original, has lost nothing in its adaptation. When we say that, in addition to her literary labours, Miss Dietz has composed the music, designed the scenery, and made some new and effective alterations in the costumes, besides nightly impersonating the character of the simple Marguerite, we shall have said enough to show how versatile are her talents, and to prove how great her labours must have been in all directions.

The Northern Evening Mail went on to say:

A Marguerite more terse, girlish, and fascinating than Miss Dietz it would be impossible to obtain. The impersonation was a success throughout, in its, naturalness, emotional power, refinement, and sensitiveness. In the various scenes calling forth such an amount and diversity of effort, she acquitted herself admirably, and it is no wonder, therefore, that after each act, she was called before the curtain with such enthusiasm, and so loudly applauded.

In 1881, Dietz fatigued of stage life and abandoned the profession. She continued her public readings, however, of which Moncure D. Conway wrote:

As a dramatic reciter and interpreter of modern ballad poetry, she is unequaled. She recites Aldrich's 'Baby Bell,' Browning's 'Count Gismond' and other poetic romances with such consummate art, pathos and simplicity that her audiences are spell-bound and sometimes profoundly moved.

=== Writer ===
Her literary work began in 1873, when she contributed verses to New York periodicals, and later in London under the pen name of "Ella Dietz". She wrote frequently for the English and American press. In 1877, she published The Triumph of Love (176 pages, Emory Adams Allen, London, 1877), which was well received by the English press. Seven years later, she published The Triumph of Time (London, 1884), which was soon followed by The Triumph of Life (London, Emory Adams Allen, 1885). These were mystical poems, composed of songs, lyrics and sonnets, ranging over the whole gamut of human and divine love, and marked by the same high qualities that distinguished all her work. She wrote several pieces for the "Church and Stage Guild" including "Of Art Critics And Audiences" (to Canon Liddon), "Goethe's Faust" (Church Reformer, December 1885), "Faust's Monologue" (Church Reformer, February 1886), and "Church And Stage, A Paper read by Ella Dietz before the Church Guilds Union" (Church Reformer, March 1886).

While in London she was a member of the Church and Stage Guild, and of the religious Guild of St Matthew. She lectured before clubs and took part in other philanthropic endeavors. She was connected with Sorosis since its beginning, in 1868, and on her return to New York, in 1881, immediately joined its committees, and served for two years as its president. She was a leading factor in the Federation of Women's Clubs.

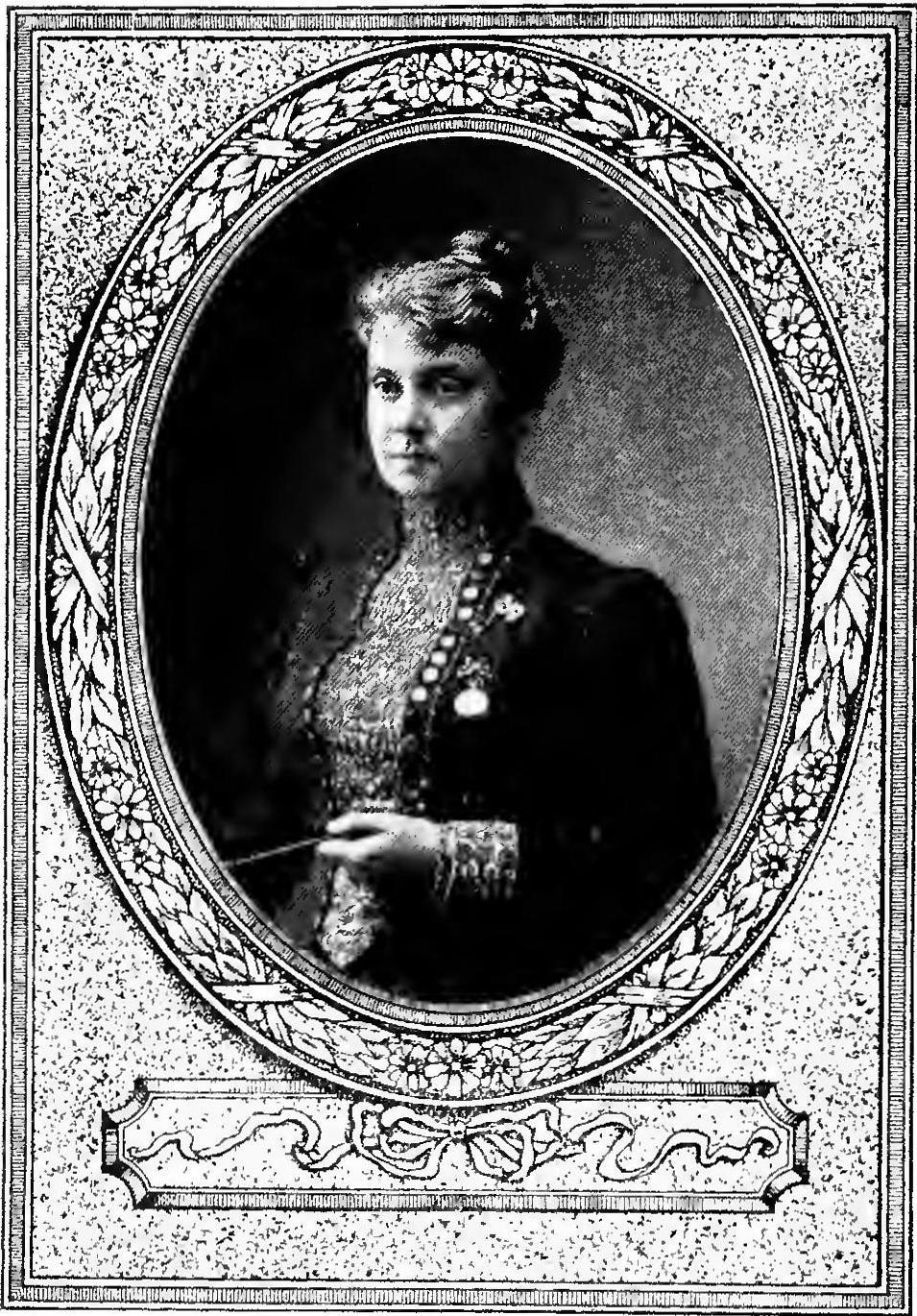
Mrs. Webster Glynes, London (Formerly Mrs. Ella Dietz Clymer of New York) from The History of the General Federation of Women's Clubs for the First Twenty-two Years of its Organization published in 1912

== Personal life ==
In 1898, she married Webster Glynes. She had one son, Edward Manuel Clymer.

Ella Dietz Clymer died in London, England, January 9, 1920.

== Critical reviews ==
The Triumph of Love, sold for Three Shillings and Sixpence. It was reviewed by The Examiner who stated—

"There is no ordinary depth and tenderness of feeling in these poems. They have a curious resemblance in sentiment to the mystical poetry of the seventeenth century." The Sunday Times reviewer noted, "Few volumes of modern poetry deserve a warmer welcome than 'The Triumph of Love', of Ella Dietz. Tender, thoughtful and womanly throughout, it rises in points into absolute inspiration, and it has every variety of charm that cultivation, fervent aspiration, and poetic perception can bestow."

The Triumph of Time sold for Four Shillings and Sixpence. It was reviewed by The Academy who stated:—

"The new poem has a pathetic and obvious human interest, quite apart from its hidden intention. We find much to commend in its sweetness and simplicity, its directness and force. There is the ease of mastery in not a few of these poems. The writer knows what she can do and does it without effort. There is a pure and tender womanliness in everything the book contains."

The Literary World commented as well:—

"A mystical poem of considerable power and beauty, composed of lyrics and sonnets on the varying phases of religious feeling and human Live. A rare grace and tender beauty breathe into these strange song;s. Some of these sonnets are of uncommon excellence."

The Triumph of Life sold for Seven Shillings and Sixpence. It was reviewed by The Graphic who stated:—

"It is possible, nay probable, that to the general reader there will appear much that is unintelligible in "The Triumph of Life; A Mystical Poem" by Ella Dietz (E. W. Allen), but to students of sacred philosophy, and to the illuminati generally the sublime thought so musically conveyed therein will endear it, as much as will its tender and graceful love songs to all who can appreciate amatory poetry of a high class, free from eroticism. On first glancing through the bock wc perceived whence was derived its special inspiration, by the appended quotations from the Talmud, from Jacob Boh men, from Mollnos, and other less celebrated writers; and Miss Dietz has nobly carried out her scheme, in verse which should not be suffered to perish. To those who seek for graceful love songs of the first order we would recommend amongst others, "My Lady's Bower", "Unexpressed", and "Love and Death" (page 317). For the poems dealing with more exalted matters, we can but refer the reader to the volume itself, — merely remarking that a public which can, or professes to, understand the inner meaning of "John Inglesant" ought to experience no difficulty in Miss Dietz's utterances."

== Selected works ==
- 1877, The triumph of love. : a mystical poem in songs, sonnets, and verse
- 1884, The triumph of time. : Mystical poem
- 1885, The triumph of life. : Mystical poem
