= Charlotte Beebe Wilbour =

American feminist, speaker and writer (1833–1914)

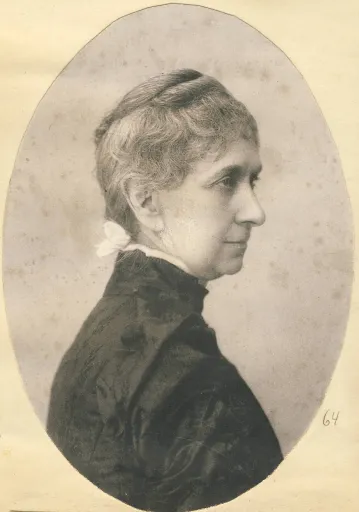
- Born: 25 December 1833; East Hartford, Connecticut
- Died: 25 December 1914 (aged 81)
- Occupations: Speaker, writer, political organizer
- Spouse: Charles Edwin Wilbour
- Children: 4, including Evangeline Wilbour Blashfield

Charlotte Beebe Wilbour (25 December 1833 – 25 December 1914) was an American feminist, speaker, and writer. She was one of the founders of Sorosis, the first professional women's club in America, as well as its president for many years, and one of the founders of the Association for the Advancement of Women. She was one of the pioneer leaders of the women's suffrage movement in America.

== Early life ==
Charlotte Beebe was born December 25, 1833, in East Hartford, Connecticut, daughter of Springfield, Massachusetts Methodist Episcopal clergyman Reverend Edmund M. Beebe and Lucinda Beebe. She was educated at Wilbraham Academy in Massachusetts, and immediately joined the ranks of feminists and reformers. She would remain an activist her entire life.

She married Charles Edwin Wilbour on 18 January 1858. They had four children: Evangeline Wilbour Blashfield, Theodora Wilbour, Victor Wilbour, and Zoe Wilbour.

== Political views and work ==
In her early twenties, Wilbour became a Progressive Friend, a movement of Quakers looking for a new spirituality, and a spiritualist. In 1857 Wilbour was secretary of the Michigan Yearly Meeting of the Friends of Human Progress, a radical Quaker offshoot. She began a long public career that combined feminism, spirituality, and politics first as a medium, and then as a popular “trance speaker,” addressing public audiences on topics of religion and politics, including abolition. The title of one of her talks captures her style and interests: “Unity and Diversity of all things in the Universe,—especially of religions, and of all movements for the amelioration of the condition of the Race.” (Trance speakers claimed the right to speak in public – denied to most women — because they wrote or delivered their lectures in a trance. Wilbour wrote her lectures in trance and delivered them in a conscious state.) Wilbour also had a permanent position as a lecturer on these topics, in Milwaukee. She later published some of these lectures in Soul to Soul: Lectures and Addresses Delivered by Charlotte Beebe Wilbour During the Years 1856-1858.

Wilbour continued her political work after her marriage. She was a colleague of Susan B. Anthony in the fight for abolition and for women's right to vote, and helped organize Anthony's fiftieth birthday party in 1870. In 1872 she addressed the Judiciary Committee of the New York State Assembly on the topic of “Why we ask the ballot.” She also continued her spiritual work, sometimes combining it with her politics. In 1874 she addressed the Assembly of Spiritualists, arguing that the public speaking platform was “the people’s arena,” a democratic alternative to the pulpit. The pulpit “may seem fit for the solitary despot whose empire it has sometimes served” but on the platform, “Virtue is the only strength—Reason the only test—and Spiritual Power the only exaltation.”

Wilbour was one of the founders of Sorosis, the first professional women's club in America, in 1868. According to one biography, she founded that because women were excluded from the New York Press Club dinner for Charles Dickens. She became president in 1870 and served until 1875, and was again president from 1903 to 1907.

In 1873 she played a key role in organizing the Association for the Advancement of Women. This was an offshoot of Sorosis, focused on issues of higher education and practical subjects relating to the welfare of women. It was an organization, its founding letter suggested, where these topics “might be offered, discussed and acted upon, and that mutual counsel and help might be rendered.”

In 1874 the Wilbours moved to France, with extensive visits to Egypt. In her 1877 "Of Egyptian women", she offered a thoughtful sociological study of contemporary Egyptian women based on her visits from a feminist and suffragist perspective.

After her husband's death in 1896, Wilbour returned to the United States. She continued her radical politics and religious work, serving once again as president of Sorosis and on the committee of The Woman's Bible in the 1890s, a project by Elizabeth Cady Stanton and a committee of twenty-six women to challenge traditional religious orthodoxy.

== Death and legacy ==
Wilbour died 25 December 1914, and was buried in the New Wilbour cemetery in Little Compton, Rhode Island. Her body was later moved to Woodlawn Cemetery in New York City. Her daughter, Theodora Wilbour, began a series of anonymous gifts of English silver to the Boston Museum of Fine Arts in honor of her mother in 1933.

== Published works ==
- Wilbour, Charlotte Beebe. 1872. Soul to soul: lectures and addresses delivered by Charlotte Beebe Wilbour during the years 1856–1858. New York: G.W. Carleton.
- Wilbour, Charlotte B. 1872. Why we ask the ballot: an address before the Judiciary Committee of the Assembly of the State of New York, April 3, 1872. New York: G.W. Carleton.
- Wilbour, Charlotte B. 1874. “An Address, delivered on the Twenty-sixth Anniversary Exercises, before the Assembly of Spiritualists, convened at Robinson Hall, New York City, March 31, 1874. – in Brittan's Quarterly Journal, p. 224.
- Wilbour, Charlotte B. 1887. Of Egyptian women. Paris: [publisher not identified; At head of title: Association for the Advancement of Women, fifteenth annual congress, New York, October 1887.

== Bibliography ==
- Braude, Ann. Radical Spirits: Spiritualism and Women's Rights in Nineteenth-Century America. Bloomington, Ind: Indiana University Press, 2013.
