= Brooklyn Medical Papyrus =

Ancient Egyptian medical papyrus

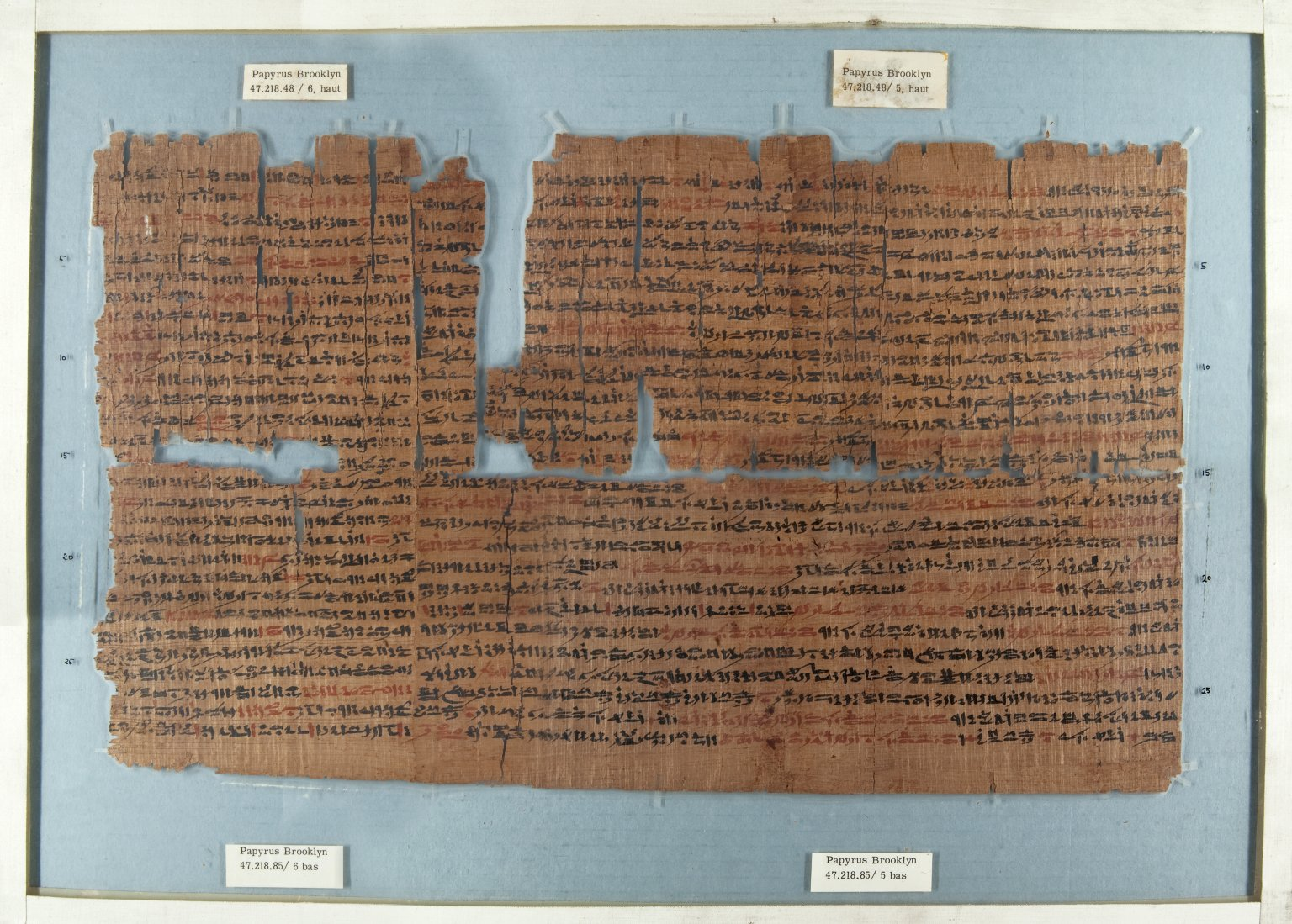
- Created: c. 450 BCE
- Present location: New York City, New York, United States

The Brooklyn Medical Papyrus (47.218.48 and 47.218.85) is a medical papyrus dating from ancient Egypt and is one of the oldest preserved writings about medicine and ophiology. The manuscript is dated to around 450 BC and is today kept at the Brooklyn Museum in New York City.

== The manuscript ==
The Brooklyn Papyrus consists of a scroll of papyrus divided into two parts with some parts missing, its total length is estimated to 175 × 27 cm. The text is on the recto side. The different numbers refer to the upper part (-48, 66,5 × 27,5 cm) and the lower part (-85, 66,5 × 27,5 cm) of the scroll.

The manuscript is a collection, the first part systematically describing a number of different snakes and the second part describing different treatments for snakebites. The manuscript also contains treatments of scorpion bites and spider bites.

The papyrus scroll is dated between 660 and 330 BC around the Thirtieth Dynasty of Egypt. The text however is written in a style common during the Middle Kingdom which could suggest its origin might be from the Thirteenth Dynasty of Egypt.

=== Contents ===
The text proceeds page by page, alternating between the two parts of the papyrus. Thus each complete page starts with 47.218.48 and finishes with 47.218.85 (the accession numbers given by the Brooklyn Museum). The title and start of the work are missing, and the extant part of the first section commences at line 15 of the lower part (designated page 1) and continues to page 2 of both upper and lower parts, terminating at line 16 of the latter. The first section comprises a systematic description of snakes and their bites. The last line states that there have been descriptions of 38 snakes and their bites, of which the first 13 are lost.

The second section starts on line 17, page 2 of the lowers part (47.218.85), and continues almost complete up to the fifth pair of pages. Only the right-hand halves of the sixth pair of pages remain. The second section commences in paragraph 39 with an important introduction:

Beginning of the collection of remedies to... drive out the poison of all...snakes, all scorpions, all tarantulas and all ::serpents, in the hand of the kherep priests of Serqet and to drive away all snakes and to seal their mouths.

The second section then continues with many remedies and a few spells for those bitten by snakes. The format for the remedies is strictly pragmatic, and most are based on the species of snake responsible for the bite, or the symptoms suffered by the victim. The remedies are in the typical format of prescriptions that appear in the Ebers Papyrus and other medical papyri which were apparently intended for lay doctors. This papyrus provides the most striking evidence for the closely parallel roles of the physician swnw and the various priests concerned with healing.

== History ==
The date of the scroll's discovery is not known. It was purchased around 1889 by Charles Edwin Wilbour and donated to the museum by his daughter Theodora Wilbour in the early 1930s. The manuscript might originate from a temple in Heliopolis.

In 1989, French Egyptologist Serge Sauneron published an extensive description of the manuscript in his book Un traité égyptien d’ophiologie - Papyrus du Brooklyn Museum nos 47.218.48 et 85

The ancient Egyptians were well aware of both snake's usefulness in controlling vermin and the dangers posed by its poison. Snake deities were worshipped in hopes of preventing potential attacks by their earthly representatives.

At present, the manuscript is not on display at the Brooklyn Museum. The archive numbers are 47.218.48 and 47.218.85.

== Snakes listed in Part One of the papyrus ==
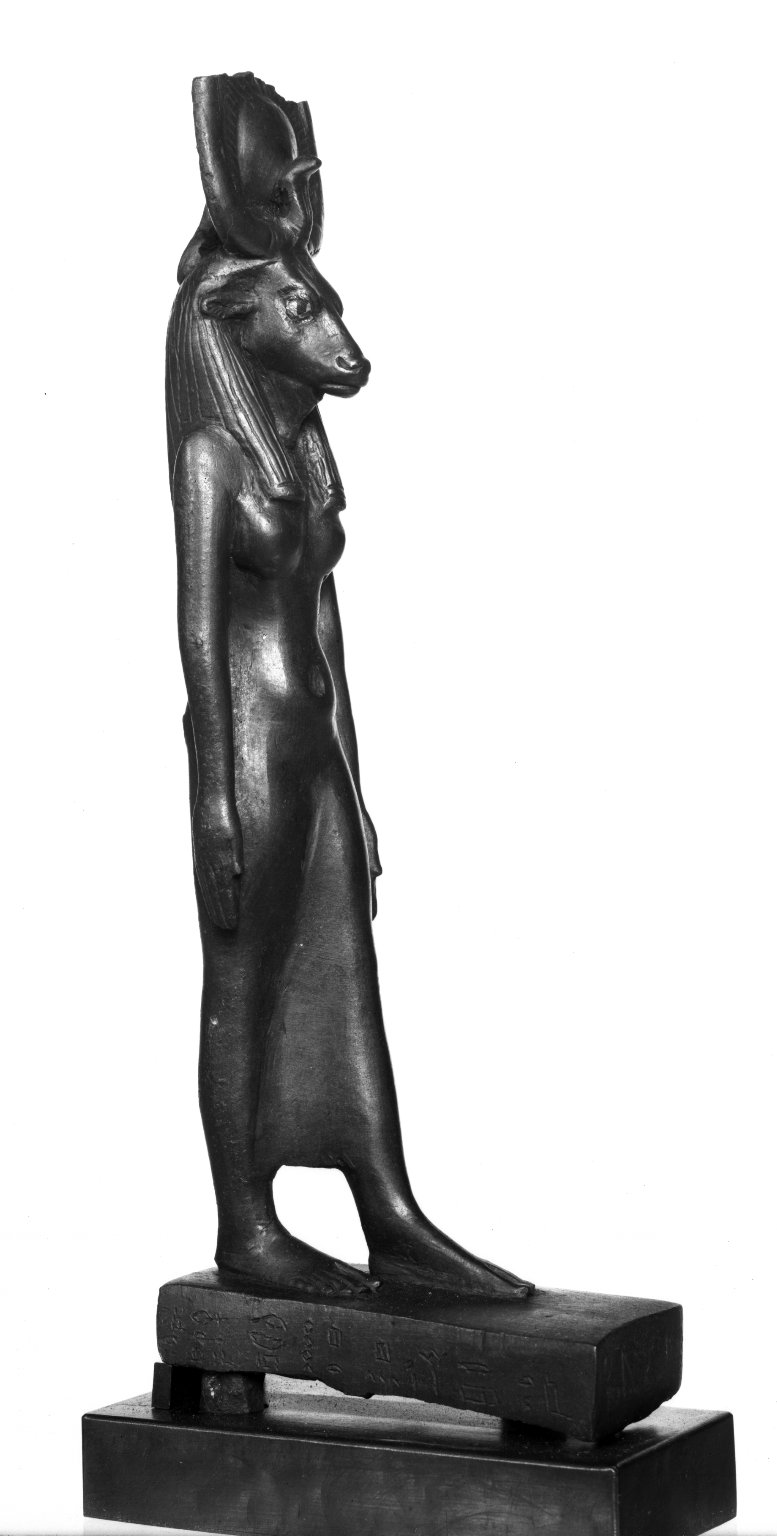
Statuette of Hathor, c. 640 BC

Paragraph	Egyptian name	Distinctive features	Severity of bite	Associated god	Specific treatment (Para.)
14	(lost)	(lost)	can be saved	none	-
15	Great serpent Aapep	entirely red, belly white, 4 teeth	dies quickly	none	-
16	gany	entirely black	dies quickly	Sobek	-
17	ikher	dark, comes to a man	dies quickly^{1}	Kherybakef	-
18	ka-en-am	quail-colored, big head, tail like mouse	can be saved	Sobek/Neith	-
19	kedjuu	small as lizard	dies quickly	none	-
20	sedbu	red, yellow eyes	can be saved	none	48,52
21	nebed^{2}	green, belly white	non-lethal	Hathor	-
22	fy tiam	color of rer snake	non-lethal	Geb	51
23	white henep^{2}	entirely white, 4 teeth	may die	Serqet	78
24	red henepu^{2}	white, red back, 4 teeth	can be saved	Seth	80
25	neki	2.4m long	non-lethal	Ra	45,47
26	fy	image of lotus on forehead	non-lethal	Horus	-
27	fy(blowing)	blue/green on neck, unique crawling motion	can be saved	Horus	73
28	fy(horned)	quail-colored	non-lethal	Horus	75
29	fy(small)	quail-colored, no horns	can be saved	Horus	-
30	fy	no description	can be saved	Horus	-
31	fy(male)	like red henepu 24 above	can be saved	Seth/Geb	-
32	hefaw arar	sand colored	non-lethal	Seth	-
33	hefaw nefet	quail colored, makes loud blowing noise	can be saved	Horus	-
34	(lost)	entirely white	can be saved	Seth	-
35	r-bedjadja	black, 3 teeth	(lost)	Khonsu	53
36	sedbu	gold belly and neck, found in fields	harmless	(lost)	52
37	(lost)	black, belly white	non-lethal	Hathor	-
38	kar	green, changes colors according to background	can be saved	Anubis	-

- ^{1} Can be saved if the snake is weak
- ^{2} Female pronoun used throughout the description
- Numbers of teeth refer to the bite wound
- The word fy may mean viper, or a snake resembling a viper

== Modern interpretation ==
Herpetologists have proposed identifications for many of the animals it describes, but some remain uncertain partly because the species no longer live in Egypt. Niche modelling has been used to predict paleodistributions of ten species and found to lie within ancient Egypt or in trading areas.

== Gallery ==
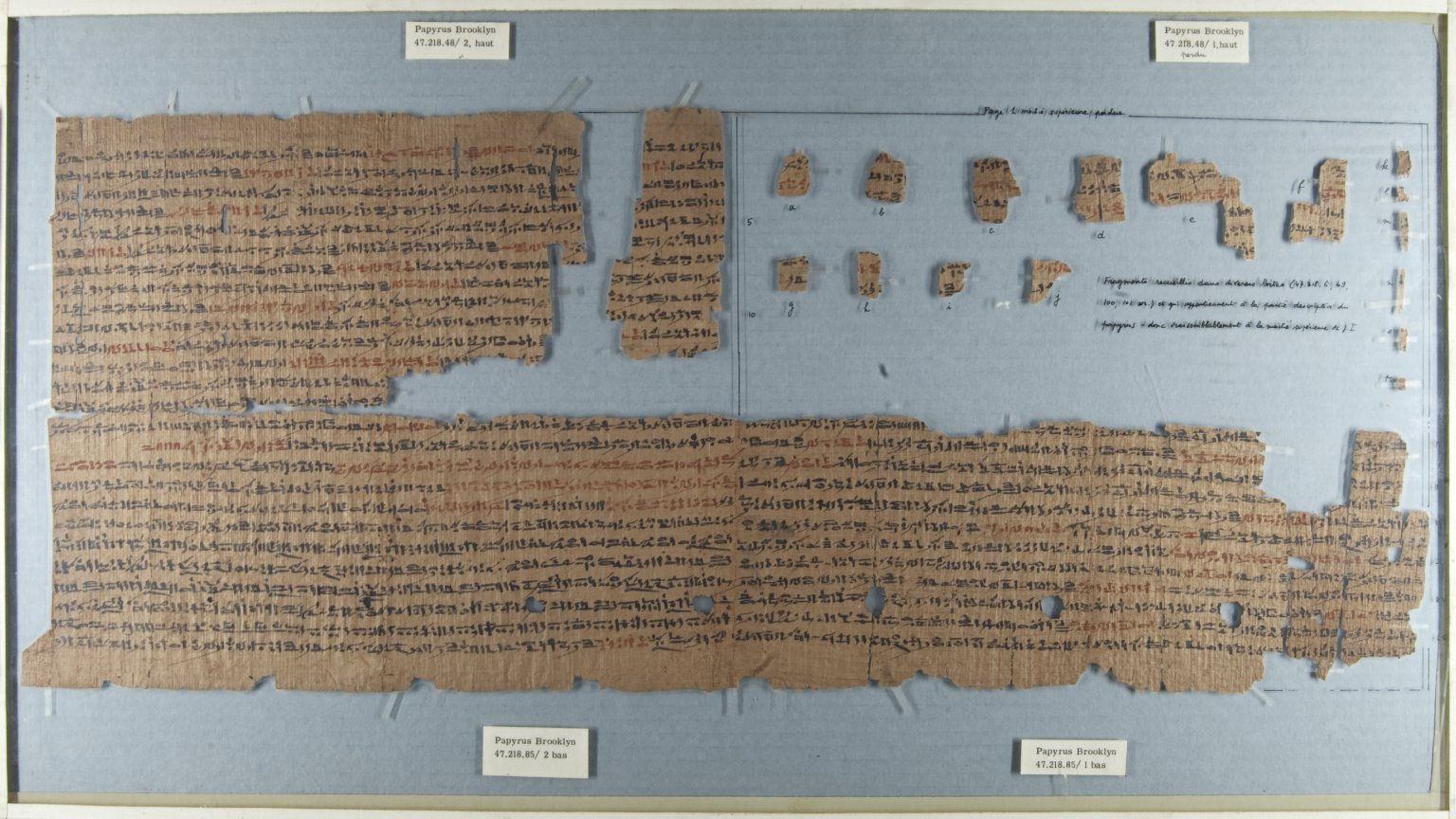
Brooklyn Papyrus

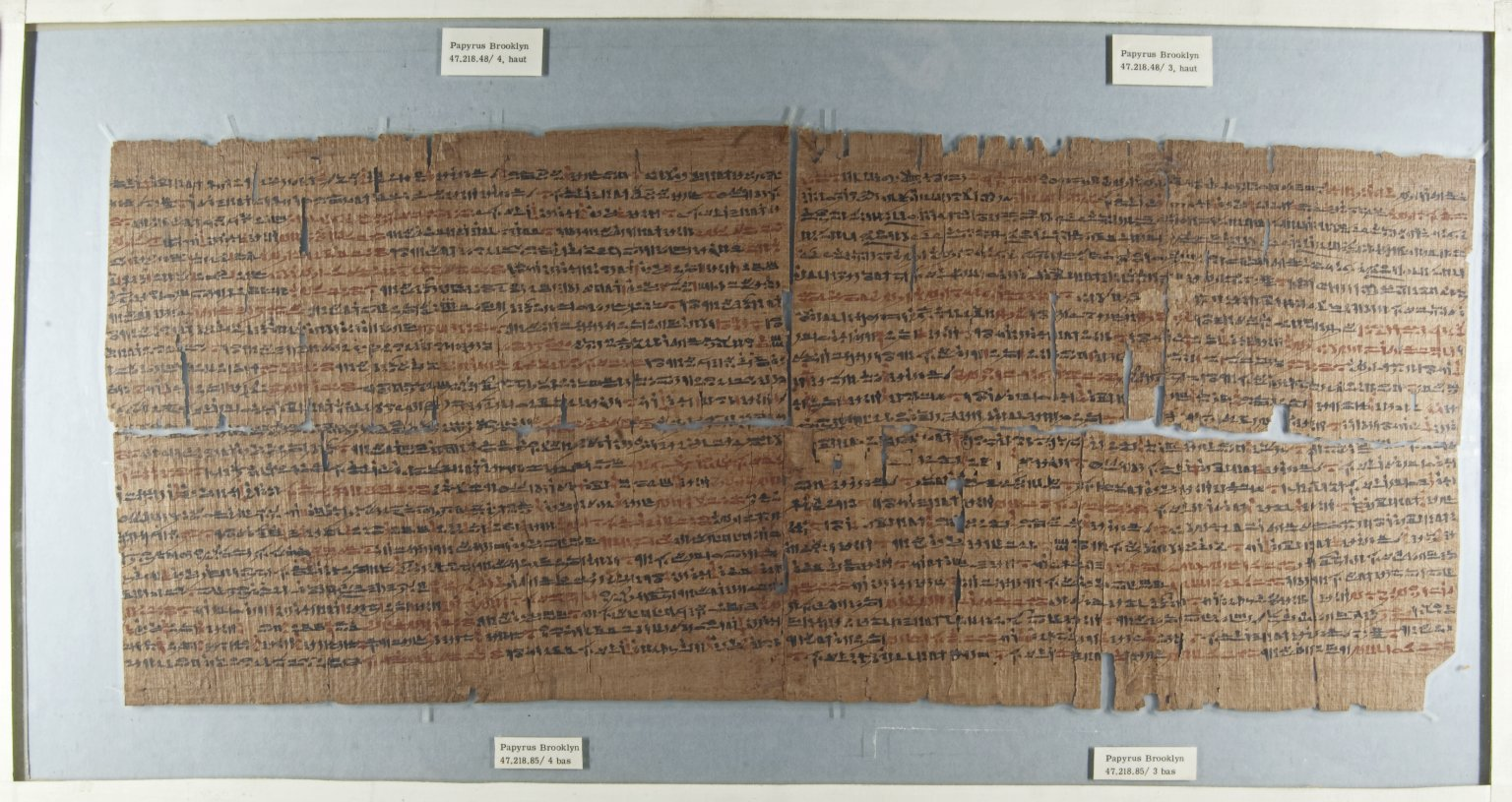
Brooklyn Papyrus

== See also ==
- List of ancient Egyptian papyri
