= Charles Edwin Wilbour =

American egyptologist and translator

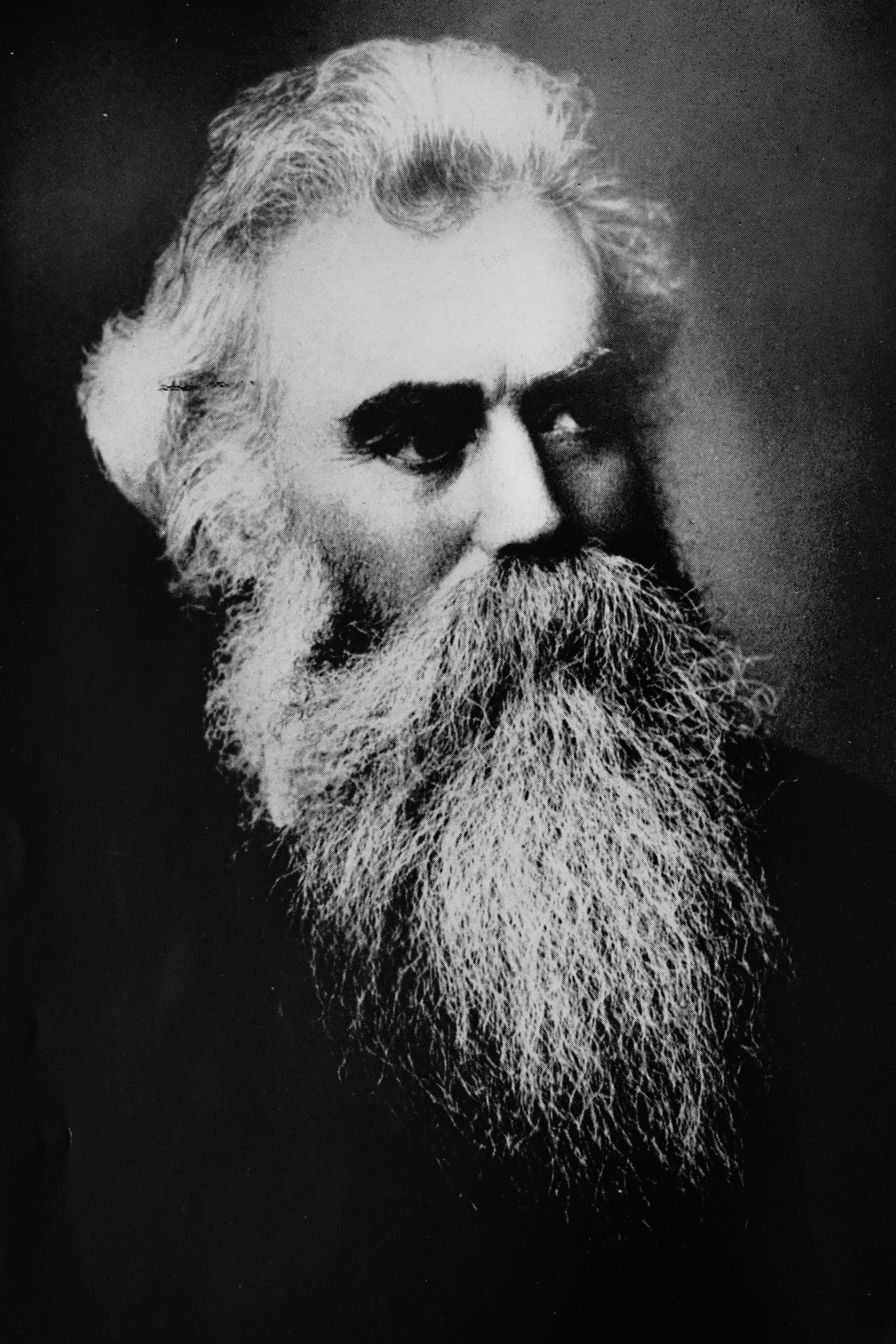
- Born: March 17, 1833; Little Compton, Rhode Island
- Died: December 17, 1896 (aged 63); Paris, France
- Resting place: Woodlawn Cemetery, New York City
- Education: Brown University
- Occupation: Egyptologist
- Spouse: Charlotte Beebe
- Children: 4, including Evangeline Wilbour Blashfield

Charles Edwin Wilbour (March 17, 1833 – December 17, 1896) was an American journalist and Egyptologist. Wilbour is noted as one of the discoverers of the Elephantine Papyri and the creator of the first English translation of Les Misérables.

== Biography ==
Charles Edwin Wilbour was born in Little Compton, Rhode Island, on March 17, 1833. He received a classical education and entered Brown University, where he took a prize for proficiency in Greek and was noted for his thorough acquaintance with the ancient and modern languages, but did not graduate due to poor health.

Having taught himself shorthand, when he had sufficiently recovered, he went to New York City in 1854 and became connected with the New York Herald Tribune as a reporter. Wilbour also studied law and was admitted to the bar in 1859. Over the following eighteen years, he devoted himself to literary and journalistic work.

In 1872, Wilbour began the study of Egyptian antiquities, visiting the principal libraries of the United States and Canada. He also owned a major paper manufacturing company, which eventually involved him in the events leading to his voluntary self-exile. He obtained many city contracts apparently dealing with Tammany Hall in the heyday of the Tweed Ring. With the fall of William M. Tweed in the early 1870s, Wilbour decided to leave the United States.

In 1874, he went abroad, consulting the archaeological collection of the British Museum and visiting prominent European libraries. He then became a co-laborer with Heinrich Karl Brugsch and Gaston Camille Charles Maspero in the field of Egyptology, accompanying the latter on five winter exploring expeditions up the Nile. Wilbour spent his winters in Egypt, working at sites throughout the country from 1880 until his death in 1896. He travelled from site to site by train, postal steamer, or hitching a lift on the steamer belonging to the Department of Antiquities. By the time of his visit in 1886, however, Wilbour decided to buy a dahabiya (houseboat), which would accommodate him, his visiting family, and his library in greater comfort.

On a visit to Aswan Wilbour purchased some papyri dug up on the island of Elephantine by local people. He did not realize the importance of his find and when he died in a hotel in Paris. His belongings, including the Brooklyn Papyrus, the Wilbour Papyrus and the Elephantine Papyri, were put in storage by the hotel and not returned to his family for nearly half a century. At the request of his widow, Wilbour's papyri were donated to the Brooklyn Museum.

Wilbour published "Rachel in the New World", from the French of Léon Beauvallet, with John W. Palmer (New York, 1856); and translated Victor Hugo's Les Misérables (1862–1863); he also published The Life of Jesus, from the French of Ernest Renan (1863).

== Legacy ==
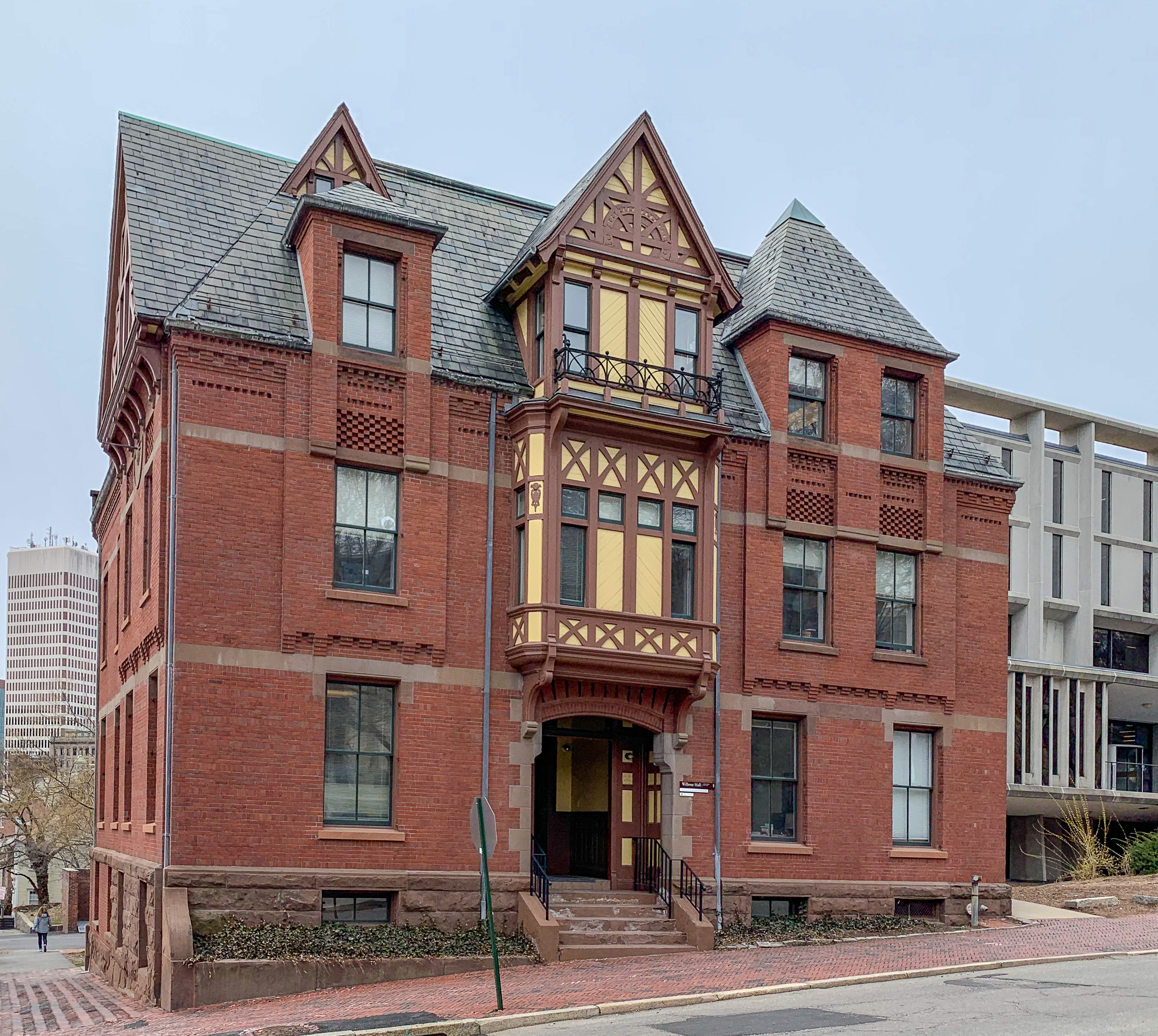
Wilbour Hall at Brown University

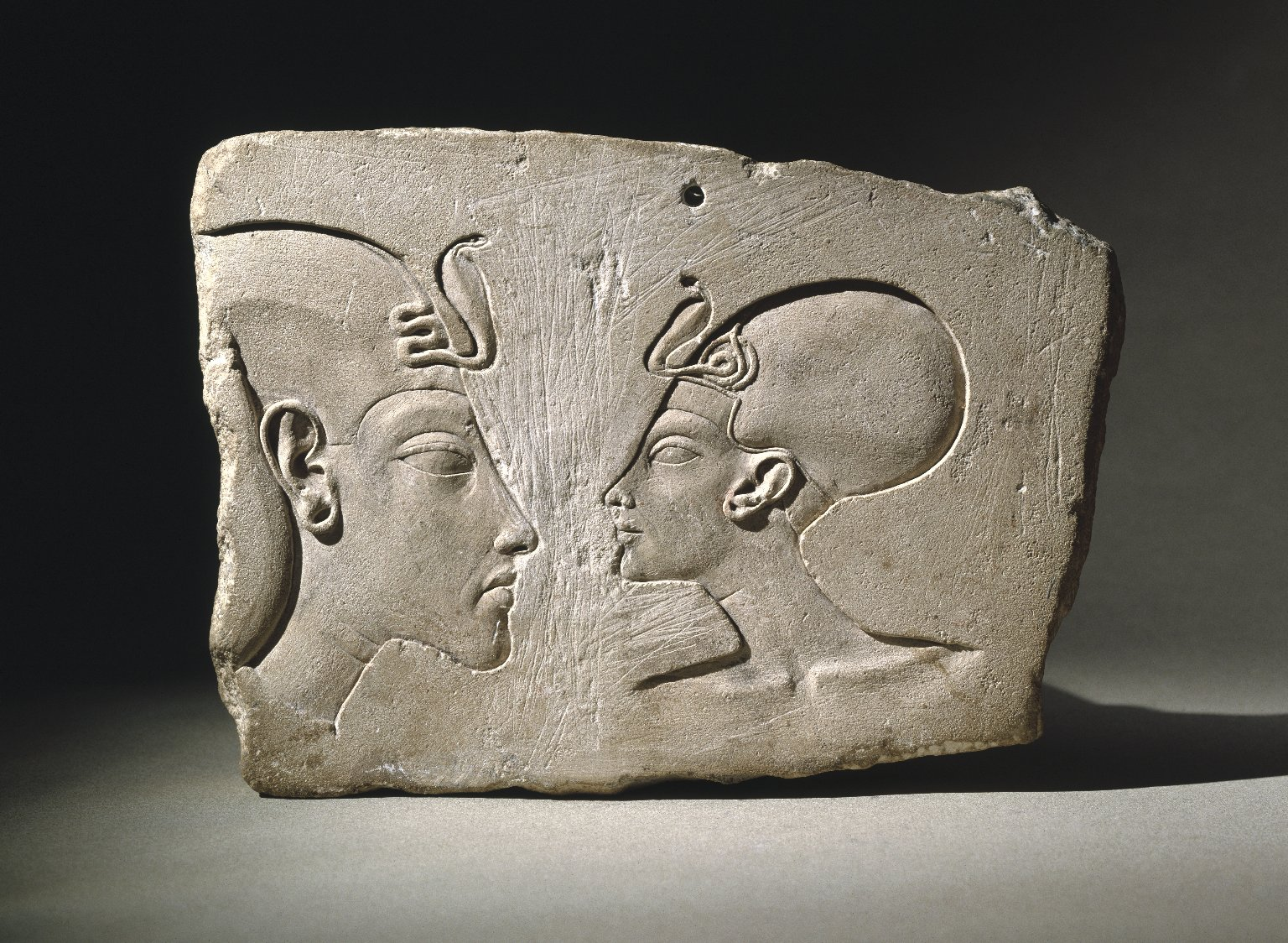
The Wilbour Plaque, ca. 1352-1336 B.C.E., named for Charles Edwin Wilbour, who acquired it in Egypt in 1881. Brooklyn Museum

The Wilbour Library of Egyptology in the Brooklyn Museum is named for him as are Wilbour Hall and the Charles Edwin Wilbour Professorship at Brown University.

In 1916, the children of Charles E. Wilbour donated Wilbour's collection of objects, his Egyptological library, and personal papers to the Brooklyn Museum. In 1932, the bequest of Victor Wilbour, the only son of Charles and Charlotte Wilbour, established the Charles Edwin Wilbour Fund. The purpose of this endowment was to financially assist in the purchasing of objects for the museum's Egyptian collection, support curatorial staff, and establish the Wilbour Library of Egyptology. As a result of the creation of this endowment, the Brooklyn Museum appointed Jean Capart (1877–1947) as Honorary Curator of Egyptology. Capart was one of the first individuals to realize the scholarly value of Wilbour's papers. In 1936, Capart published Travels in Egypt, which contains Wilbour's letters regarding his expeditions. Shortly after the publication of these letters, the Department of Egyptian, Classical, and Ancient Middle Eastern Art (ECAMEA) employed Walter Federn (1910–1967) “to classify the extensive collection of papers belonging to Charles Edwin Wilbour.”

An additional collection of Wilbour family correspondence can be found in Special Collections at Hamilton College in Clinton, New York. These include a file of letters between Charles Wilbour's wife, Charlotte, and noted Suffragists such as Susan B. Anthony, Elizabeth Cady Stanton and Isabella Beecher Hooker, among others.

== The Wilbour Archival Collection ==
The Wilbour Archival Collection documents the research and expeditions of Charles Edwin Wilbour (1833–1896), one of the first American Egyptologists. This collection includes a wide variety of materials such as articles, letters, inscriptions, notebooks, notes, publications, squeezes, bookplates, maps, and photographs.

The bulk of the collection housed at the Brooklyn Museum consists of Wilbour's letters, notebooks, and research notes. He wrote numerous detailed letters to his wife, Charlotte Beebe Wilbour, and his mother, Sarah Soule Wilbour, describing both ancient and nineteenth century Egypt. These letters also document some of the objects purchased by Wilbour that are currently found in the Brooklyn Museum. Jean Capart later published these letters in 1936 in his book Travels in Egypt. In addition, there are letters to Wilbour from renowned Egyptologists such as August Eisenlohr, Jan Herman Insigner, Gaston Maspero, Archibald Sayce, Heinrich Karl Brugsch, and W.M. Flinders Petrie regarding their research and publications.

In addition to his letters, Wilbour's research notes and notebooks offer insight into his work and provide detailed accounts of his observations and travels. Additional items of interest are inscriptions that Wilbour copied directly from sites or publications, and copies of published inscriptions with his hand-written annotations. Of particular interest are Wilbour's hand written copies from inscriptions located in the Temple of Kom Ombo, which reflect his meticulousness and attention to detail.

In addition, the sketches and photographs visually document objects and sites he visited. Of particular interest is a collection of sketches that provide impressions of inscriptions found on an unidentified sarcophagus. Not only do the photographs provide visual documentation of Wilbour's research, but they also illustrate various monuments in Aswan and other locations.

The Wilbour Library of Egyptology today is one of the world's most comprehensive research libraries for the study of ancient Egypt. The nucleus of the collection comes from the personal library of Charles Edwin Wilbour, an American Egyptologist who also assembled the museum's extensive Egyptian antiquities collection. With over 35,000 volumes, the Wilbour Library is an important resource for textual and visual information about the history of ancient Egypt. It also holds material on art and culture of the ancient Middle East.
