= Fannie Smith Goble =

Member of the Spokane Board of Education

Fannie Smith Goble (October 13, 1861 - June 17, 1940) was a member of the Spokane Board of Education and one of the owners of The Excelsior Rock Springs Coal company, Wyoming.

== Early life ==
Fannie Smith was born in Chesaning, Michigan, on October 13, 1861, the daughter of Oliver Cook Smith (1825-1904) and Jane E. "Jennie" Ross (died in 1962).

== Career ==
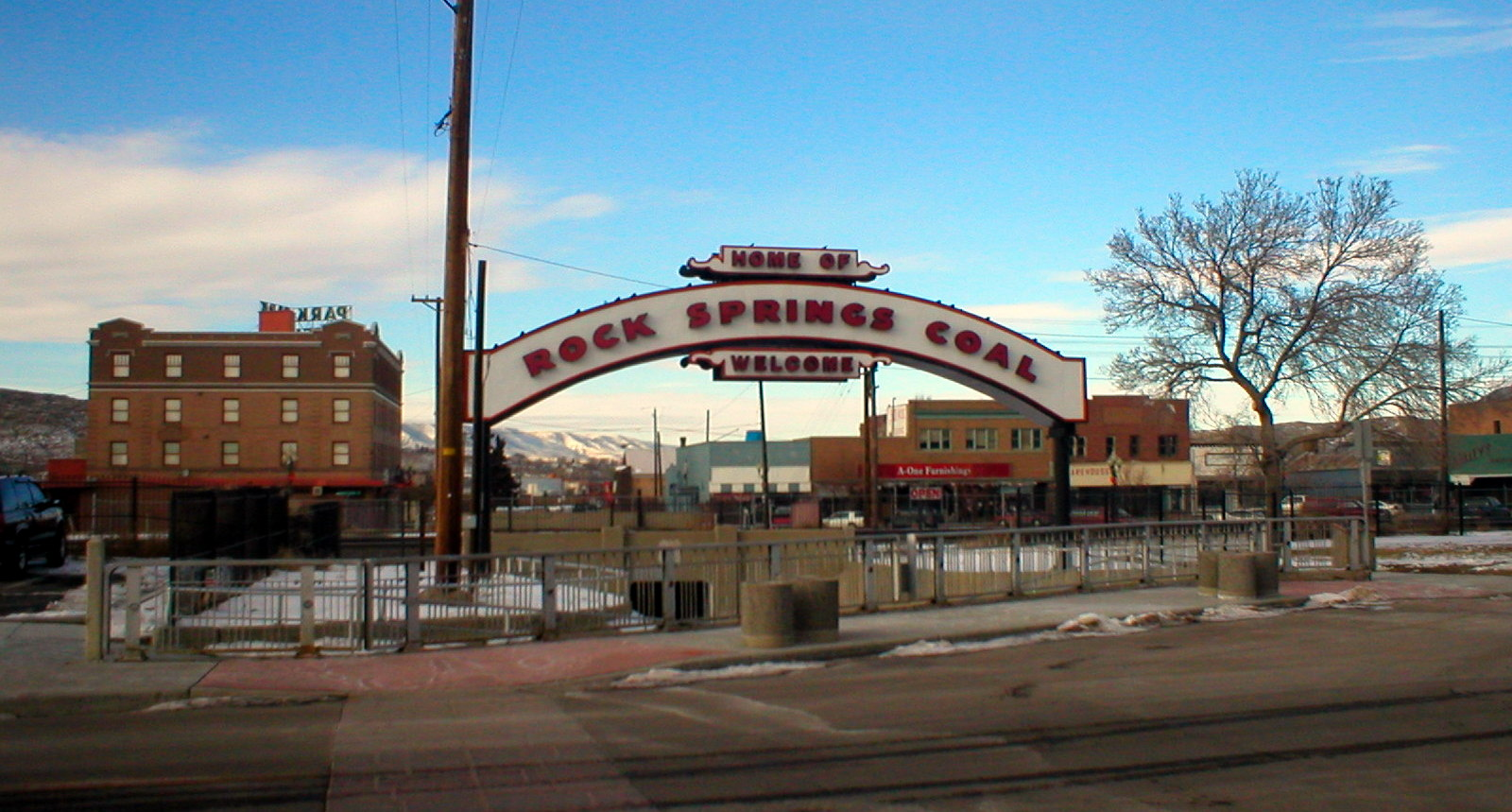
Rock Springs Coal company

Fannie Smith Goble was a member of the Spokane Board of Education.

She was an active club woman. She held several high offices in Daughters of the American Revolution organization, she was a regent for the State of Washington; she was the president and treasurer of Spokane Sorosis Club. She was a life member on the Young Women's Christian Association Board of Directors.

While living in Rock Springs at the end of the 19th century, the Gobles owned The Excelsior Rock Springs Coal company, which was incorporated in 1899 by millionaire B.R. Wells from Chicago. The other owners were John Beckwith and A.V. Quinn of Evanston, Illinois. The company owned a large tract of coal land and expected to ship coal of superior quality starting from 1900 and to manufacturer coke. The capital stock of the company was $300,000.00 ($300,000.00 in 1914 had the same buying power as $7,242,960.00 in 2017)

== Personal life ==
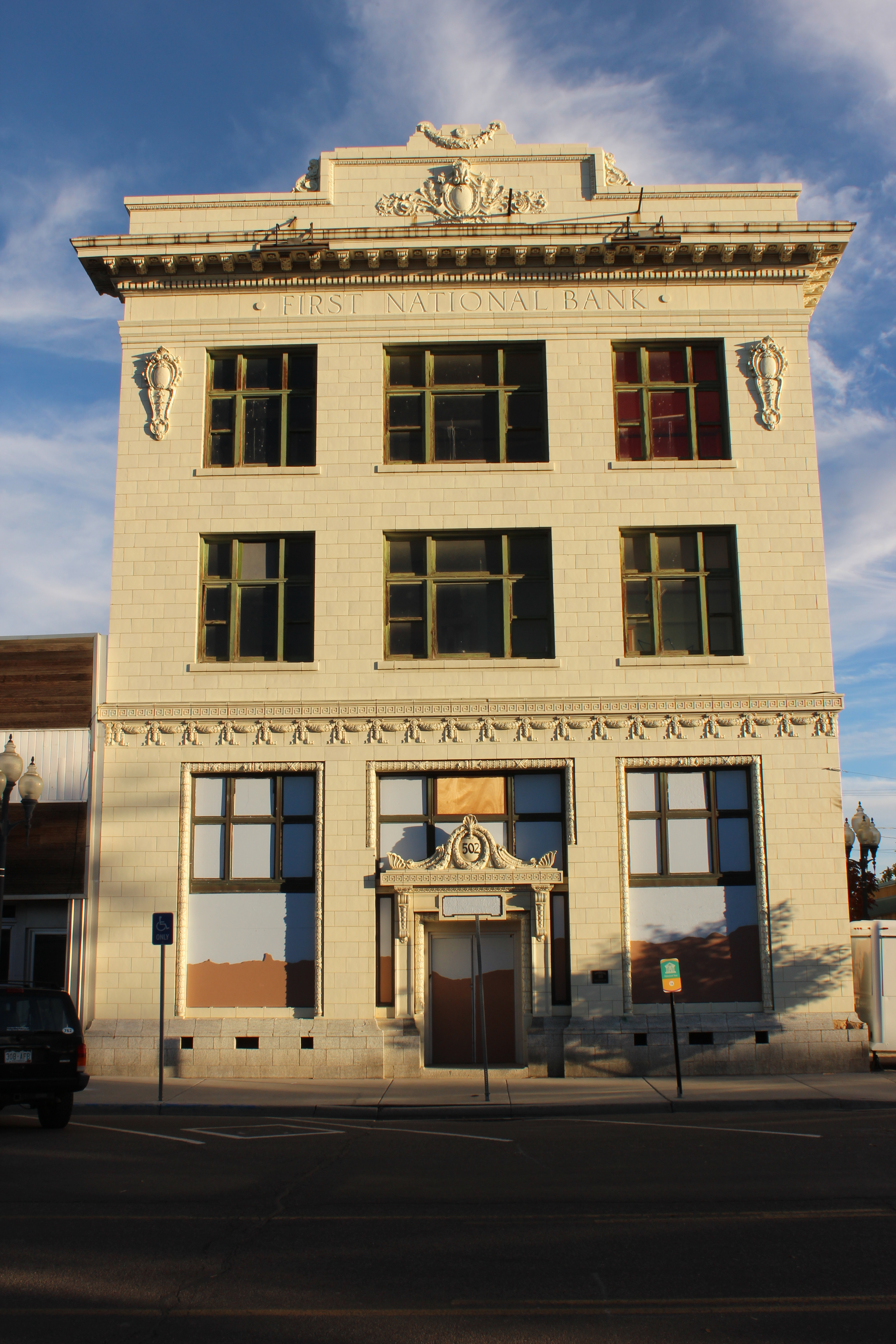
First National Bank Rock Springs

Fannie Smith married George Harvey Goble (1854-1933). They had two daughter, Katherine and Olive.

When her husband was employed by the Rock Springs National Bank they moved to Rock Springs, Wyoming. Goble Street in Rock Springs is named after them. They moved to Washington in 1907 and lived at 1019 7th Avenue, Spokane, Washington. She last moved to Akron, at 96 Overwood Road, at the house of her daughter Mrs. J.P. Maider.

She died on June 17, 1940, in Akron, Ohio, and is buried with her husband at Riverview Cemetery, Baldwinsville, New York.
