= Rutgers Female College =

Educational institution in New York City

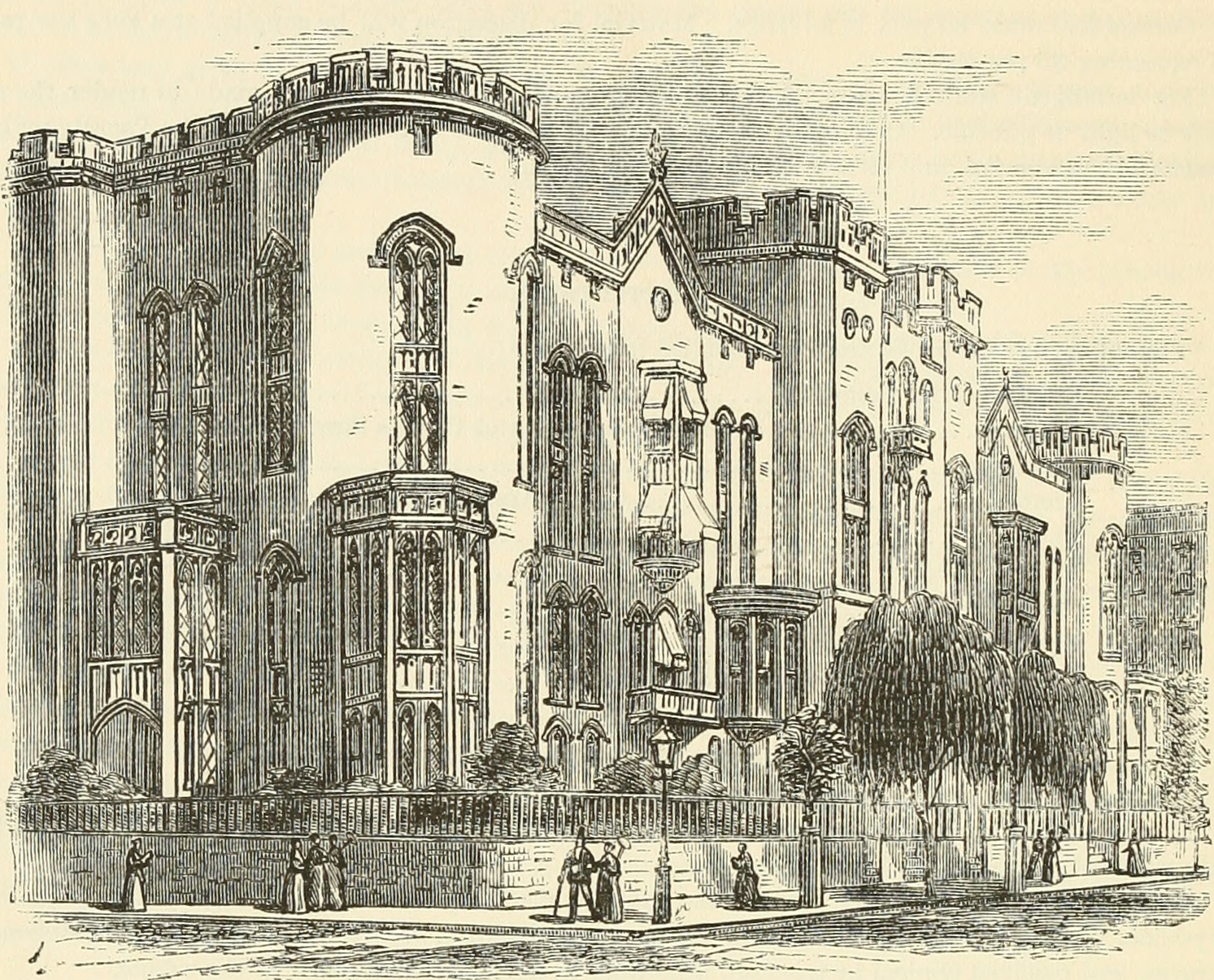
- 487–491 Fifth Avenue, New York City
- New York City, New York, U.S.

Information
- Other names: Rutgers Female Institute
- School type: Private women's seminary
- Opened: May 6, 1839
- Founders: William B. Crosby, Isaac Ferris
- Closed: 1894

Rutgers Female College was a private women's seminary, chartered in April 1838 under the name Rutgers Female Institute. It was located in New York City, and moved to a few locations within the city before closing in 1894.

== History ==
Its first home was at 262–66 Madison Street on the Lower East Side of New York City, on land lent by William B. Crosby, one of the first incorporators. Isaac Ferris was a co-founder. The cornerstone of a new building was laid August 29, 1838, and the institute was opened on May 6, 1839. It was the first seminary for the higher education of women in the City of New York.

In 1860, it moved uptown to 487–91 Fifth Avenue.An application for a full collegiate charter was made to the New York State Legislature, and granted April 11, 1867, expressly conferring on Rutgers all rights, powers, and privileges enjoyed by any college or university in the state, except the authority to grant medical or legal diplomas.

By 1870, a branch had been established in Harlem, at the corner of Second Avenue and 124th Street.

At the 1870 commencement the college conferred an honorary doctorate upon Maria Mitchell, a professor at Vassar College, and one of the first well known women astronomers.

By 1889, the college had moved to 54 and 56 West 55th Street. The college celebrated its 55th anniversary in 1894, and ceased operations that same year.

== Notable people ==
=== Alumni ===
- Caroline Hart Merriam (1827–1893), mother of Clinton Hart Merriam, biologist, and Florence Augusta Merriam Bailey, ornithologist
- Susie Barstow (1823–1936), landscape painter
- Mary Helen Peck Crane (1827–1891), activist, writer
- Margaret Winship Eytinge (1832–1916), author
- Florence Carpenter Ives (1854–1900), journalist and editor
- Calista Robinson Jones (1839-1913), National President of the Woman's Relief Corps
- Jennie de la Montagnie Lozier (1841–1915), physician
- Anna Oliver (1840–1892), preacher
- Emma Homan Thayer (1842–1908), botanical artist and author

=== Others ===
- Julia Keese Colles (1840–1913), faculty
- Oliver Crane (1822–1896), faculty
- Samuel D. Burchard (1812–1891), president

== See also ==
- List of defunct colleges and universities in New York
