= Evangeline Wilbour Blashfield =

American writer and translator (1858–1918)

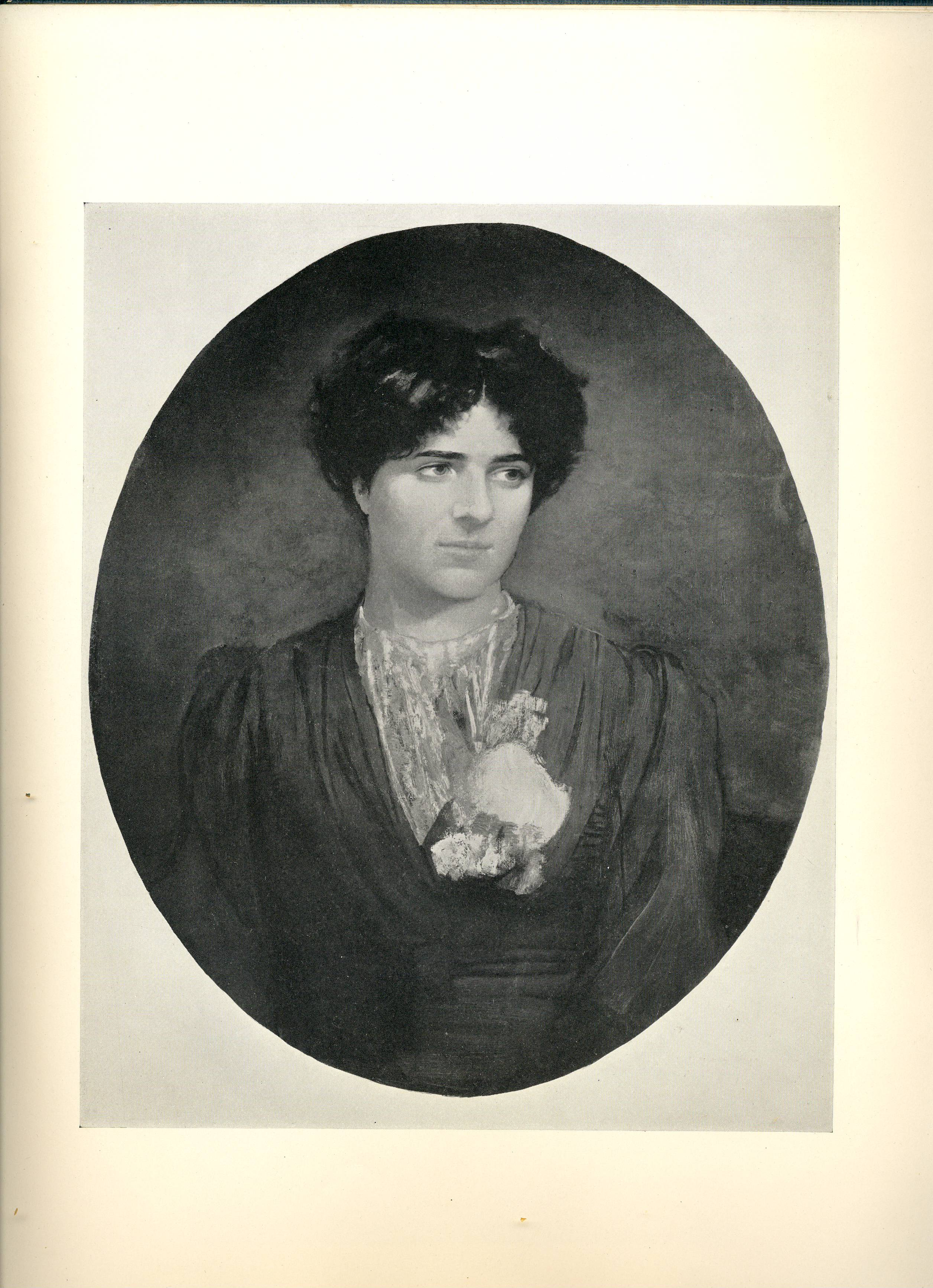
- Born: September 1, 1858; Little Compton, Rhode Island, United States
- Died: November 15, 1918 (aged 60); New York City, United States
- Burial place: Woodlawn Cemetery, New York City, United States
- Employer: Atlantic Monthly
- Organization(s): Colony Club; Municipal Art Society of New York
- Spouse: Edwin Blashfield (m. 1881)
- Parents: Charles Edwin Wilbour (father); Charlotte Beebe Wilbour (mother)

Evangeline Wilbour Blashfield (September 1, 1858 – November 15, 1918) was an American writer, historian and translator.

== Biography ==
Blashfield was born on September 1, 1858, in Little Compton, Rhode Island, United States. Her father was egyptologist and translator Charles Edwin Wilbour and her mother was feminist, suffragist and writer Charlotte Beebe Wilbour. She had three siblings: Theodora, Victor and Zoe. She was educated at the convent school of the Sisters of Saint Mary the Virgin. She then studied at finishing schools in Florence, Italy, and in Paris, France, becoming fluent in French and Italian with knowledge of German, Arabic and Latin.

Blashfield met painter Edwin Blashfield at a dance in Paris in 1876 and they married in 1881. They lived in New York City from 1882. Together they wrote Italian Cities (1900) and translated Vasari's Lives of the Painters (4 vols., 1897) from Italian. She contributed the writing and her husband contributed the illustrations.

Blashfield wrote for the Atlantic Monthly (such as short stories The Education of a Saint and The Ghoul) and a collection of biographies of women, Portraits and Backgrounds: Hrotsvitha, Aphra Behn, Aïssé, Rosalba Carriera (1917). English writer Virginia Woolf used Blashfield's work on the English playwright, poet and spy Aphra Behn as the basis of her own work on Behn.

Blashfield was a charter member of the Colony Club and a member of the Municipal Art Society of New York. She called for investment in public art and beauty.

In 1916, Blashfield and her siblings Theodora and Victor donated their father's book collection to the Brooklyn Museum.

Blashfield died of the Spanish Flu on November 15, 1918, in New York, New York, United States, aged 60. She was buried at Woodlawn Cemetery. American writer Kate Douglas Wiggin wrote in the New York Times obituary for Blashfield that "New York has lost a woman of very uncommon and very precious type."

In 1919, a granite and mosaic memorial foundation was gifted by the Municipal Art Society of New York to the city in Blashfield's memory, located at Bridgemarket beneath the Queensboro Bridge in Manhattan, New York City. In June 2003, 85 years after Blashfield's death, restoration work took place on the memorial fountain.

== Select publications ==
- Afloat on the Nile (1891)
- A Day with the Donkey Boys (1892)
- Italian Cities (1900)
- Masques of Cupid (1901)
- The Education of a Saint (1904)
- The Ghoul (1912), set in Luxor, Egypt
- Portraits and Backgrounds: Hrotsvitha, Aphra Behn, Aïssé, Rosalba Carriera (1917)
