= Rebecca A. Morse =

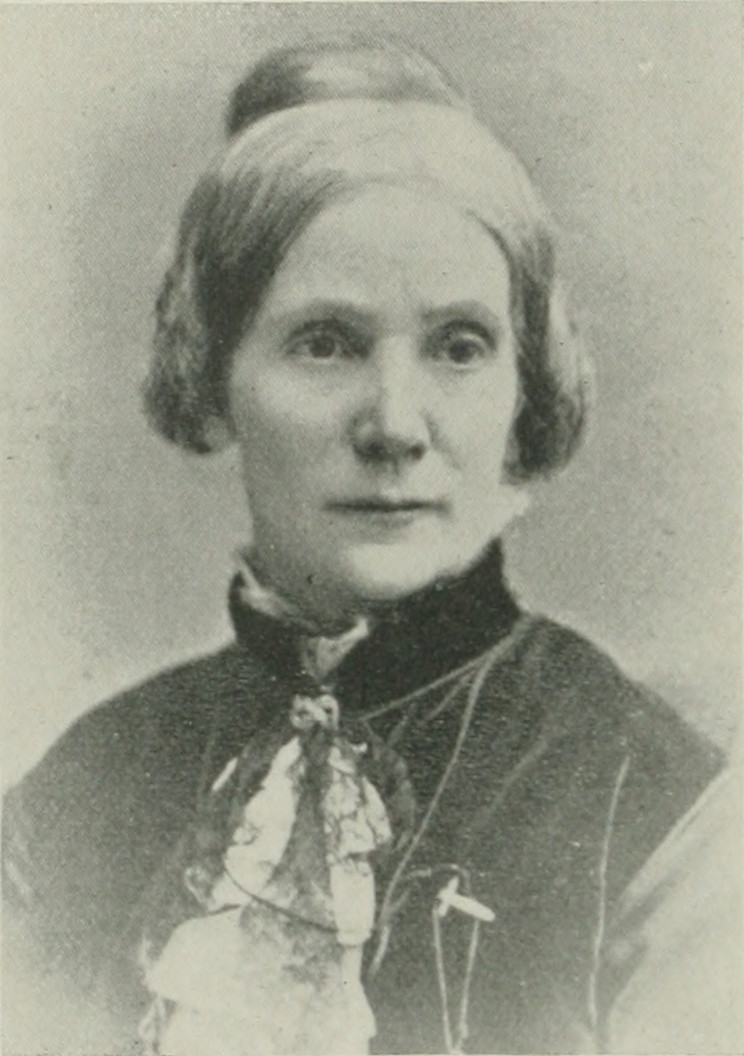
Rebecca A. Morse

Rebecca A. Morse (born 1821) was an American club leader.

== Early life ==
Rebecca A. Morse was born on Manhattan Island, New York, on the Gen. Rutgers estate, in 1821. She was a descendant of the well-known Holland-Dutch family, the Bogerts, one of the pioneer families of New York.

She received the educational training usual among the substantial families of those days.

== Career ==
Rebecca A. Morse was known as a correspondent in New York City for newspapers and magazines in 1846. Her work consisted of notes on society, descriptions of costumes, art notes, art gossip from studios, and similar features of metropolitan life. She wrote under the pen-names "Ruth Moza." "R. A. Kidder" or the initials " R. A. K."

In youth she imbibed the principles of the anti-slavery agitators, and she was always the fearless advocate of the Afro-American people. In the home of her sister, Mrs. M. E. Winchester, which was headquarters then for worn in suffragists, Morse met Elizabeth Cady Stanton, Susan B. Anthony and other leaders.

She was one of the earliest members of Sorosis, and was vice-president for several terms. She filled other offices in that society. She was one of the originators of the Woman's Congress, and was always an earnest worker for the advancement of women. She founded the Sorosis of Nantucket.

== Personal life ==
Rebecca A. Morse married Prof. M. Morse in 1853.

Her residence was in New York City. For twenty-five years she spent her summers in Nantucket, where she had a home.
