= Isabel Elizabeth Smith =

American artist

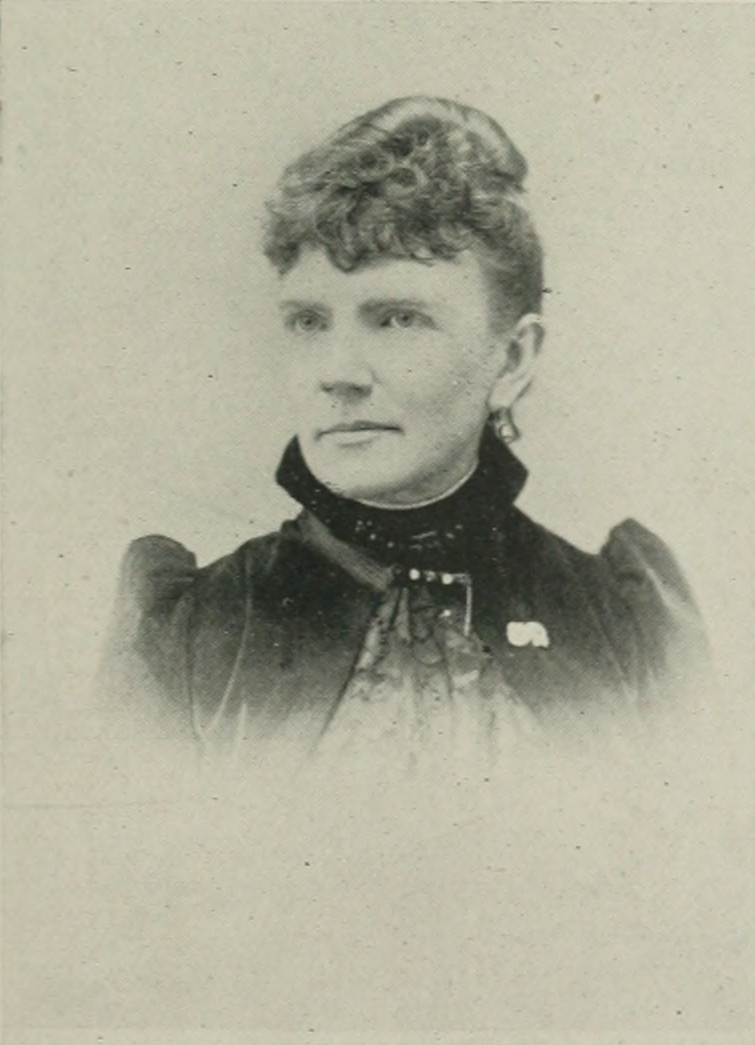
Isabel Elizabeth Smith

Isabel Elizabeth Smith (1843-1938) was an American artist, mostly known for miniature painting and teaching.

== Early life ==
Isabel Elizabeth Smith was born in Clermont County, Ohio, in 1843. She was of Scotch descent. Her father, Alexander Smith, was born in Perthshire, Scotland. He arrived in the United States in 1820 and located in Belmont County, Ohio. His wife was Rachel McClain. They had a family of three children, a son and two daughters. The father was a man of great nobility of character, a lover of art and a philanthropist. The mother was a woman of excellent mind and given to the doing of kindly deeds.

Smith early developed a taste for art. She was educated in the Western Female College, Oxford, Ohio, and studied art during vacations in Cincinnati, Ohio. After her education she went abroad and studied in Paris and Dresden. After an absence of nearly three years she returned to the United States and opened a studio in Washington, D. C., in 1871.

== Career ==
She achieved marked success in portrait painting, having many prominent persons as sitters, among them Secretary Edwin Stanton, a full-length portrait of whom was ordered from her by the representatives of the city government. She also painted the portrait of Mary Frances Grant Cramer, a sister of Gen. Ulysses S. Grant.

While in that city, she became a member of the Methodist Episcopal Church. During her years of labor in Washington her eyes failed her, but after a season of rest she again went to Paris to learn the Sèvres method of painting on porcelain. She also studied in the Dresden Gallery, receiving criticisms from the celebrated Director Julius Schnorr von Carolsfeld.

On her return she opened a studio in New York City, where she had the best possible recognition from the literary and art circles. While there she was elected a member of Sorosis, in which society she held the position of chairman of the art committee. She usually had several students, whom she taught gratuitously.

When fifteen years of age, she had a severe illness, during which she vowed to build a church for the poor in her native place, which through her aid and influence was done, and to which she gave her interest and help.

She painted in Cincinnati, and her portraits there were highly praised. She was the instructor in art in Chautauqua, New York, for four years, having her studio in the Kellogg Memorial Building. She gave up her studio in New York to devote her time and care to her invalid mother.

== Personal life ==
In 1895 she married F. Carl Smith (1867-1955), a marine and genre painter. The couple worked and studied in Paris for several years, then New York City, to finally settling in Washington, D.C., in 1902. In 1917 they moved to Pasadena, California.

Her father owned a large tract of land in Florida, near the mouth of the St. John's river, where he had an orange grove and a winter home. There she spent several winters.

She died in 1938.
