= Sorosis =

American women's club in New York

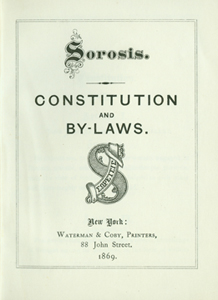
Sorosis Club rules in 1869

Sorosis was the first professional women's club in the United States. It was established in March 1868 in New York City by Jane Cunningham Croly.

== Origin of the name ==
Sorosis is a latinate word meaning 'aggregation' (from the Greek sōros, meaning ‘heap’). Its object was to further the educational and social activities of women by bringing representative women of accomplishment in art, literature, science, and kindred pursuits. The club's name, Sorosis, would be chosen by Jane Croly through searching countless of dictionaries. Croly was fond of "its full, appropriate signification, its unhackneyed character and sweet sound". Briefly, Kate Field, one of the 14 charter members, changed the club's name from Sorosis to the "Women's League", but after much consideration and a second ballot, Sorosis would be restored as the club's name. As a result, Field and others withdrew from the club. The meeting concluded with president Alice Cary giving the inaugural address. The following week, Cary would resign the presidency due to the strain the disputes caused to her health.

== History ==
In March 1868, a group of women was denied the purchase of tickets to attend the all-male New York Press Club hosted dinner for author Charles Dickens at Delmonico's. In response to being excluded by the New York Press Club, Sorosis was organized. On April 20, 1868, Sorosis hosted its first lunch meeting at the same restaurant. They invited Dickens, but he declined to attend. At the meeting, the 14 charter members of Sorosis were Alice Cary, Jane Cunningham Croly ("Jennie June"), Kate Field, Phoebe Cary, Ella Dietz Clymer, Celia M. Burleigh, Josephine Pollard, Ellen Louise Demorest, Charlotte Beebe Wilbour, Anne Botta, "Fanny Fern" Parton, Henry M. Field, Lucy Gibbons, and James T. Field. In January 1869, Sorosis would become incorporated as a legal institution. Within one year, Sorosis had 83 members. Along with Boston's New England Woman's Club (also founded in 1868), Sorosis inspired the formation of women's clubs across the country.

The Sorosis ... was organized ... to promote "mental activity and pleasant social intercourse," and in spite of a severe fire of hostile criticism and misrepresentation, it has evinced a sturdy vitality, and really demonstrated its right to exist by a large amount of beneficent work. ... These ladies pledged themselves to work for the release of women from the disabilities which debar them from a due participation in the rewards of industrial and professional labour ... I believe it has been the stepping-stone to useful public careers, and the source of inspiration to many ladies.

— Emily Faithfull, 1884

Early members of Sorosis participated in professions and political reform movements such as abolitionism, suffrage, prison reform, temperance and peace. Sorosis expanded its local chapters beyond New York City in the early twentieth century. They went on to organize war relief efforts during both World Wars. Peacetime activities included philanthropy (such as support for funding the MacDowell Colony), scholarship funds, and social reforms such as literacy training for immigrant women. In later years, Sorosis focused its activities on local projects, raising money for the aid of other women's clubs, funding scholarships for women, and aiding local rescue missions.

In 1890, Sorosis invited other women's clubs to attend a ratification convention in New York City. Sixty-three clubs were in attendance and formed the General Federation of Women's Clubs. Together, these women's clubs pushed for social and political reform on the local, state, and national level.

The University of Texas at San Antonio houses the records for the San Antonio chapter of Sorosis. The collection spans the years 1923 through 1991 and provides information about the club's members and activities primarily through minutes, photographs, scrapbooks and yearbooks.

== Club and meeting structure ==
Each month, with the exception of a summer recess, Sorosis hosted symposiums on the following topics: literature, science, philosophy, art, drama, and education. Members of Sorosis formed committees that conducted work and research on the various symposium topics. Each committee was granted one day each year to present their work. The club also hosted business meetings two weeks after each monthly symposium.

== Viewpoints ==
The viewpoints of Sorosis leaned more conservative than other women's groups of the time. Though many of its members were suffragists, the group did not actively work towards the advancement of women's suffrage. Sorosis was known to support abolition movements, temperance, women's education, dress reform, and rights for working women. In general, Sorosis accepted traditional ideas about the differences in sexes. This included the idea that men and women have naturally different temperaments, and that men are less spiritually pure than women. They also held the viewpoint that serving others was more important than acting in self-interest for women. Sorosis and other women's clubs believed that it was these inherent gender differences, such as women's naturally higher morality and nurturing tendencies, that made it so women should take active roles in reform and bettering society.

== Member achievements ==
=== Scientific achievements ===
- Jennie de la Montagnie Lozier was a physician for 12 years. In her time as a Sorosis member she was chairman of science, chairman of the committee on philosophy, and corresponding secretary. Later on, she was elected president of Sorosis. In 1889, Lozier was sent to the International Homeopathic Congress in Paris by the New York Medical College and Hospital for Women. There, she presented her paper on women's education in medicine in French. The paper was printed in the transactions of the congress in its entirety.
- Phoebe Jane Babcock Wait was a physician and the elected chair of obstetrics at the New York Medical College and Hospital for Women. In 1883 she was named chairman of the staff at that same hospital. Later on, she was elected to the office of the dean of the college by its faculty. She was a member of several societies such as Sorosis, the Society for Promoting the Welfare of the Insane where she served as secretary, and was a consulting staff for the Brooklyn Women's Homeopathic Hospital.
- Anna Manning Comfort was a doctor of medicine and a member of the first class at the New York Medical College for Women. After graduation, she became the first women to practice medicine in the state of Connecticut. Dr. Comfort wrote "Woman's Education and Woman's Health" in 1874 as a response to a paper that attacked women's higher education.

=== Literary and journalistic achievements ===
- Ella Maria Dietz Clymer was a poet with a career in theater. In 1881, she adapted a version of Faust to be performed on an English stage. In addition to adapting the stage production herself, she also played a role in it. After leaving her theater career, she published numerous poems in both English and American press including "The Triumph of Love" in 1877, "The Triumph of Time" in 1884, and "The Triumph of Life" in 1885. Within Sorosis, she served on several committees and eventually served as its president for two years.
- Eliza Putnam Heaton was a journalist and editor. She graduated top of her class from Boston University before becoming the associate editor of the Brooklyn Daily Times. She later worked for the "Times" as an editor. In 1891, she began running the first daily news column that dealt specifically with women's movements.

=== Business achievements ===
- Alice Houghton was a broker. In 1888, she established her own real estate, insurance, and investment brokerage firm called Mrs. Alice Houghton & Co. She was the lady manager and superintendent of the woman's department in her state where she prepared Columbian Exposition displays. Within Sorosis, she was president of the Spokane branch.

== Notable members ==
- Elizabeth Akers Allen, poet and journalist
- Celia M. Burleigh, activist for women's rights.
- Alice Cary, first president of Sorosis
- R. Belle Colver, Spokane
- Jane Cunningham Croly, first vice-president of Sorosis
- Emily Faithfull, honorary foreign member
- Fanny Fern, columnist
- Kate Field, first corresponding secretary of Sorosis
- Fannie Smith Goble, president and treasurer of Spokane Sorosis Club
- Phebe Ann Coffin Hanaford, minister and suffragist
- Sophia Curtiss Hoffman, philanthropist
- Anna Lukens, Physician, teacher, member of the New York County Medical Society.
- Jennie de la Montagnie Lozier, physician, president
- Virgie McFarland, member
- Rebecca A. Morse
- Jessie Fremont O'Donnell (1860–1897), writer
- E. Jean Nelson Penfield (1872-1961), co-founder, League of Women Voters; National President, Kappa Kappa Gamma
- Josephine Pollard, children's author
- Emily Warren Roebling, assistant to and wife of Washington A. Roebling, Brooklyn Bridge Chief Engineer
- Kate Funk Simpson
- Isabel Elizabeth Smith, chairman of the art committee
- May Riley Smith, poet, president of the club 1911-1915, honorary president 1919-1927
- M. Louise Thomas (1822-1907), fourth president
- Phoebe Jane Babcock Wait, physician
- Charlotte Beebe Wilbour, founding member, feminist, speaker, and writer

== See also ==
- New England Women's Club
- Pi Beta Phi, originally founded in 1867 as I. C. Sorosis, not affiliated with Sorosis.
