= Bertha Welby =

American actress (1844–1917)

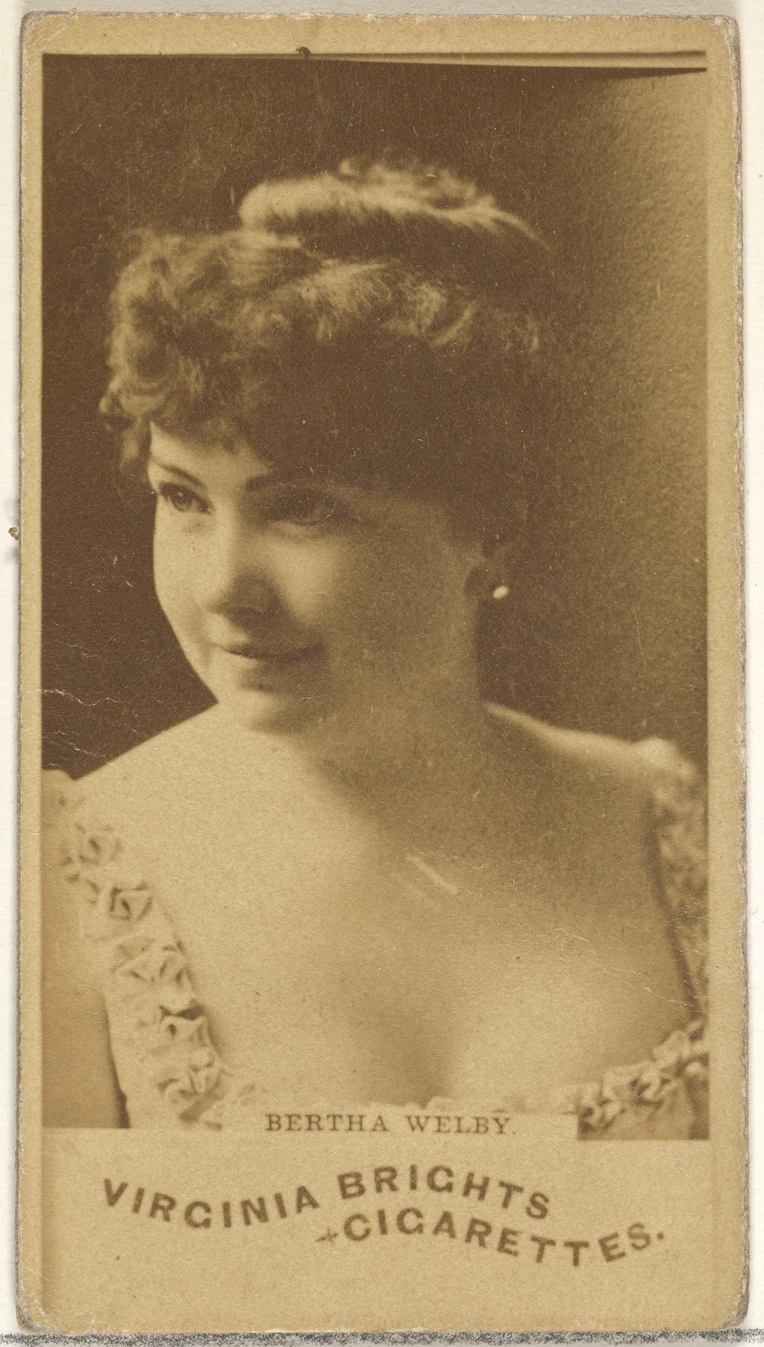
- Born: Marcia Brooks O'Rielly; 1844; Albany, New York, U.S.
- Died: February 22, 1917 (aged 72–73); New York City, New York, U.S.
- Spouse: Alexander Kelsey Cutler (m. 1867; died 1881)
- Father: Henry O'Reilly

Marcia Brooks O'Rielly (stage name, Bertha Welby; 1844 – February 22, 1917) was an American actress. She was also the founder of the Rainy Day Club in New York City, which led to shortened women's skirts, the rainy daisy, at the turn of the 20th century.

== Early life ==
Marcia Brooks O'Rielly was born in Albany, New York, 1844. She was the daughter of Henry O'Reilly, who was, at his death, the oldest living journalist in the U.S. He accumulated a large fortune, but lost it by the miscarrying of philanthropic and speculative plans. Her siblings were Mary (b. 1833), Ella (b. 1834), Emma (b. 1836), Henry (b. 1839), John (b. 1841), and Laura (b. 1846).

== Career ==
Bertha began acting from necessity and developed talents that were not imagined of in her youth. Being rendered penniless by her father's misfortunes, she took the name of "Bertha Welby", and began at the bottom of the theatrical ladder. She had no money and no influence, yet she achieved success. She was the leading member of John T. Raymond's company, and afterward filled a similar position with Laurence Barrett. For five years, she starred in legitimate drama, As You Like It, The Hunchback, Jane Shore, School for Scandal, and Camille. Her last appearance was at the Madison Square Theatre, New York, circa 1888.

Her retirement from the stage was due to a promise that she made her father on his deathbed. Afterward, she taught dramatic art. Welby also painted, having skill enough to paint three large panel pictures over a side altar in a New York City church.

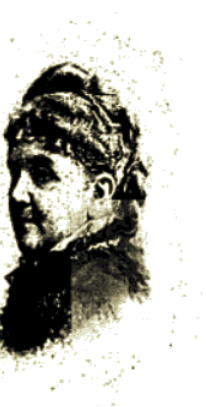
Bertha Welby (Demorests, 1896)

On November 5, 1896, in New York, she founded the Rainy Day Club. Earlier that year, she became the organization's secretary and explained the reasons for the club's existence:—

"Women in the past have been martyrs to their clothing, but I think the time is coming, and very soon, when we shall no longer be handicapped in life and rendered less happy and useful than we might be by our dress. A number of active women of New York have formed what we call the "Rainy Day Club," whose one purpose is to bring about the adoption of a convenient street-skirt for rainy days. We are not cranks. We believe very heartily in prettiness, and every one of us wants to be just as stylishly and becomingly and attractively attired as possible, but we believe in health and comfort and convenience, too. We haven't put our theory into practice yet, but intend to in the fall, when we have pledged ourselves to wear out-of-doors, and particularly on rainy days, a skirt which will be several inches shorter than the one now worn. The length will be to some extent a matter of individual taste, but personally I prefer one about five inches from the ground, with shoes whose tops are two inches higher than those usually worn. This would render leggins [sic], which I don't like, unnecessary. The costume will attract very little attention. Even now ladies are not infrequently seen wearing their short bicycle skirts when their wheels are at home. The bicycle has paved the way for the short skirt for general wear."

== Personal life ==
On April 24, 1867, in Manhattan, she married Alexander Kelsey Cutler (1839–1881).

Welby attended St. Francis Xavier's Church, New York. She died in New York City, February 22, 1917.
