= Impeachment inquiry in the United States =

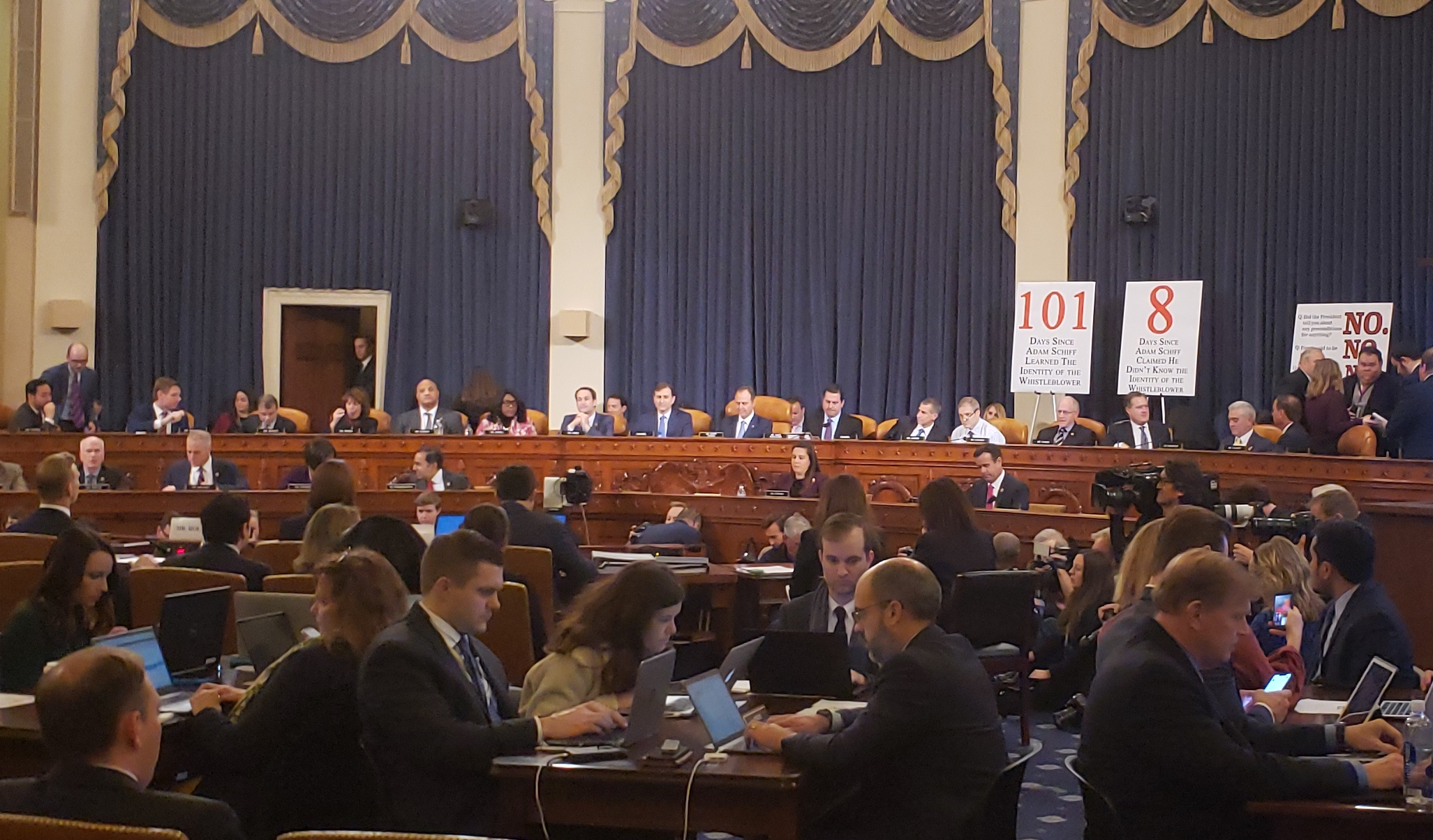
A public hearing during the 2019 impeachment inquiry into Donald Trump

In the United States, an impeachment inquiry (also known as an impeachment investigation) is an investigation or inquiry which usually occurs before a potential impeachment vote.

== Federal ==
An impeachment inquiry is not a required step in United States federal impeachment, as the Constitution of the United States does not require the United States House of Representatives (which it empowers to impeach many federal officeholders) to exercise its powers of impeachment in any specific manner. It is permissible for articles of impeachment to be adopted without any formal inquiry first occurring. Nevertheless, impeachment inquiries have been used as a step in many federal impeachment efforts, with around 90 impeachment-related inquiries having been initiated by the House of Representatives since 1789.

No individual had been impeached by the United States House of Representatives without a preceding inquiry stage until the second impeachment of President Donald Trump in 2021. However, the impeachment inquiries into President Andrew Johnson had been launched prior to the act that ultimately triggered his impeachment, and Johnson was impeached within three days without any extended investigation into that act.

=== Launching of a federal impeachment inquiry ===
Speaker of the House Nancy Pelosi announcing the launch of the impeachment inquiry into Donald Trump in September 2019

In modern practice, impeachment inquiries often are spurred by referrals by external investigative bodies, such as the Judicial Conference of the United States, an independent counsel, a grand jury or a state legislature. Since the 1980s, the Judicial Conference of the United States has referred findings to the House recommending a number of judges face impeachment, several times resulting in proceedings that led to impeachment. Though it is not always the case that impeachments are spurred by such referrals.

The United States House of Representatives has the sole authority to decide to launch impeachment proceedings (including inquiries) against impeachable federal government officials. While anyone, including any member of the United States House of Representatives may suggest the launch of an impeachment proceeding it is, in practice, the choice of the speaker of the United States House of Representatives whether to allow the House to proceed towards an inquiry into the alleged wrongdoings.

There is no House rule that specifies that a vote is required to launch an impeachment inquiry. While the speaker may allow a House vote on whether to launch such an inquiry, it is argued by many legal and political experts that it is not legally required for a vote of the House take place in order for the House to launch what can effectively be considered an impeachment inquiry. This means that a speaker may themself declare the launch of what would be considered an impeachment inquiry without any need for an authorizing vote. This became a discussion point in when the impeachment inquiry into Donald Trump was announced by Speaker Nancy Pelosi without there first having been a vote on the matter. At odds with the aforementioned consensus of experts is a January 2020 opinion issued by the Office of Legal Counsel in the Trump administration-era U.S. Department of Justice, which formally declared that it considers impeachment inquiries by the House invalid unless a formal vote had been held to authorize them. This remains an opinion to which presidential administrations and Executive Branch agencies (such as the Department of Justice, FBI, and IRS) are bound to adhere.

Existing House standing committees have subpoena and staffing authorities that may be sufficient for conducting what amounts to an impeachment inquiry, further negating the need for a House vote to hold a vote in order to launch what might functionally amount to an impeachment inquiry. This is especially true in modern times, since the investigative powers of standing committees have increased over time. However, through an authorizing resolution, it is still possible for the House to provide these committees with additional tools to aid investigations that are part impeachment inquiry, such as the power to compel responses to interrogatories. An authorizing resolution may also provide clear authorization of use of deposition and subpoena powers for the purposes of the inquiry, and may also authorize disbursement of funds and hiring of staff specific to the inquiry. An authorizing resolution passed by the House also helps make it explicit that the committee(s) investigating a potential impeachment have the imprimatur of House to be conducting an impeachment inquiry, and are indeed officially sanctioned by the members of the House to be conducting such an inquiry based upon the Constitutionally-provided investigative and impeachment powers of the House of Representatives. Authorizing resolutions also provide an opportunity for the House to formally outline the scope of an impeachment inquiry.

=== Logistics of a federal impeachment inquiry ===
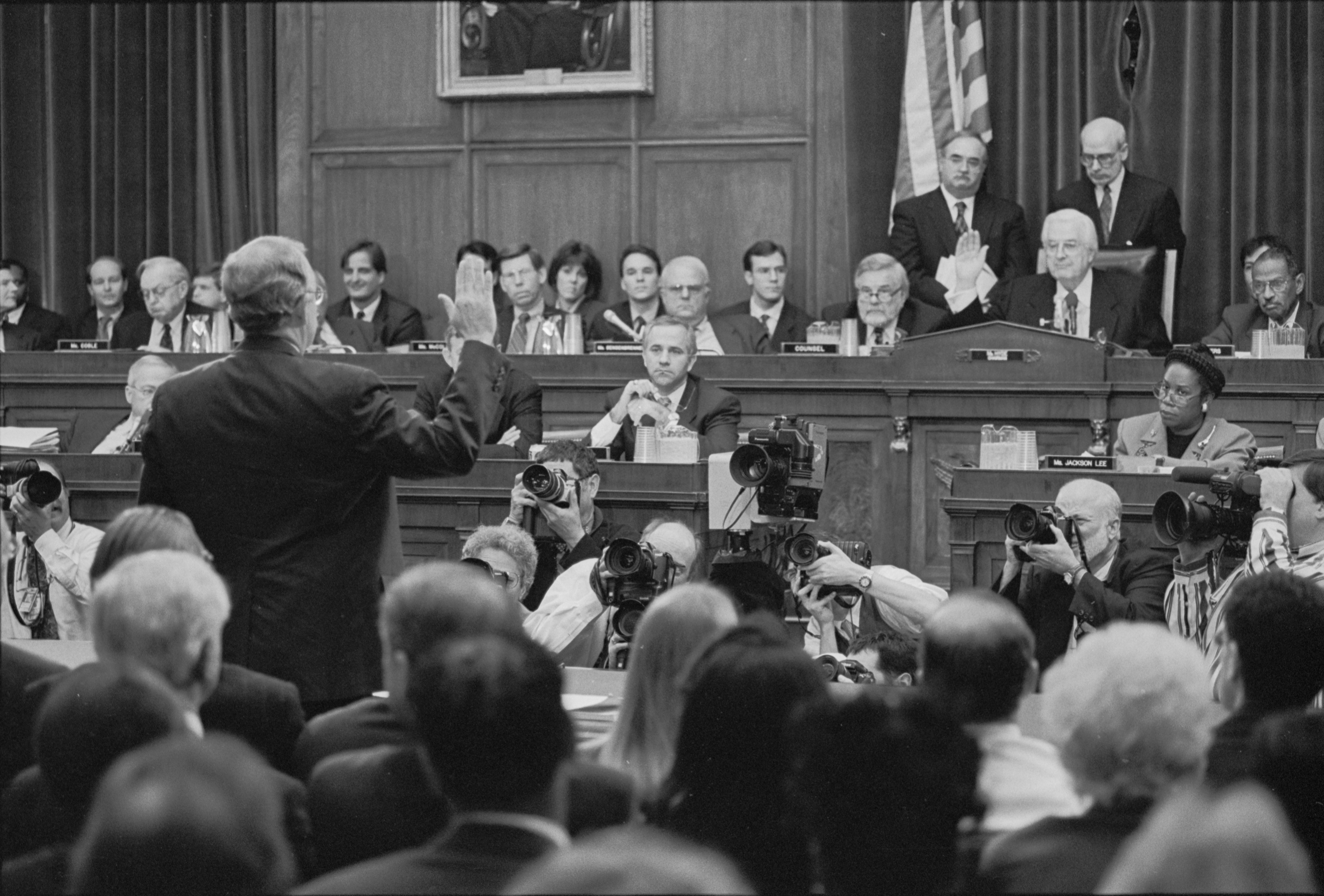
Independent Counsel Ken Starr taking an oath before testifying during hearings for the 1998 impeachment inquiry into Bill Clinton

The scope and structure of impeachment inquiries vary. Some inquiries function as completely independent investigations, while other inquiries use work from outside entities, using records provided to them by entities such as an independent counsel or the Judicial Conference of the United States. It has become regular practice in recent decades for impeachment inquiries to use information provided from separate outside investigations. Impeachment inquiries may build upon the work of earlier or ongoing investigations, conducted either by House committees or other investigators. It is possible for any House resolution expressly authorizing an impeachment inquiry to state that an inquiry is already underway, allowing for committees to continue ongoing investigations (which would be formally brought under the scope of the impeachment inquiry) and allowing for the committees to, under the auspices of the impeachment inquiry, probe new areas of investigation using their existing tools and authorities for investigation.

Since the United States Constitution does not outline details of how the impeachment process should be run in the House, procedural aspects of impeachment inquiries are subject merely to the internal rules of the House. The manner in which the House of Representatives proceeds with an impeachment inquiry is at the discretion of the House itself, both textually and per historical practice. The House has the option to have the investigation be conducted by the House Committee on the Judiciary, another standing committee, or to establish and empower a select committee (alternatively known as a "special committee") dedicated to overseeing the inquiry. Alternatively, a subcommittee, such as a subcommittee of the judiciary, can be used. Generally, an impeachment inquiry is overseen by the House Committee on the Judiciary, with the most frequent alternative being a select committee formed for the explicit purposes of conducting the inquiry. An impeachment inquiry's investigation may, alternatively, involve multiple committees instead of just one. Even then, a single committee may be tasked with making the final decision on whether to recommend formal articles of impeachment. In modern practice, this committee has tended to be the Judiciary Committee.

Impeachment inquiries are governed by the standing rules of the House (which governs all committee investigations), the terms of any authorizing resolution for the inquiry, and potentially any additional rules the committee(s) overseeing the inquiry might opt to adopt specifically for the inquiry.

There are no rules imposing any mandates on the duration in which an impeachment inquiry might be conducted, meaning that an impeachment inquiry may last as briefly or long as the House chooses to allow.

In some impeachment inquiries, legal counsel for the federal official that is the subject of the inquiry has been allowed to be involved. But there is no legal requirement that lawyers for the subject be given any accommodation for involvement, and in some instances there has been no such accommodation in impeachment inquiries.

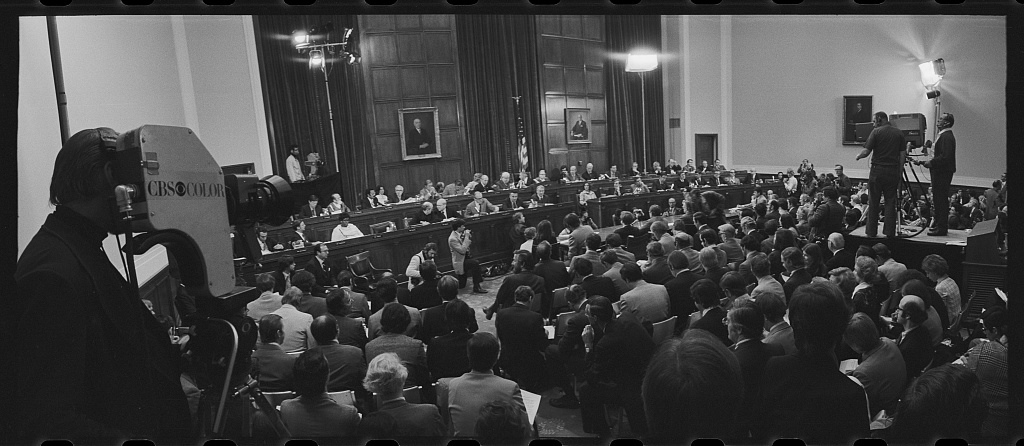
Opening day of formal impeachment hearings during the impeachment inquiry into Richard Nixon

If a committee conducting an impeachment inquiry holds hearings as part of inquiry, these would typically be governed by the House and committee rules, as well as any specific rules outlined in any authorizing resolution for the inquiry. Such hearings are generally public, but are allowed to be closed-door pursuant to regular House rules that permit closed-door hearings either due to the need to protect evidence or testimony that would imperil national security, the need to protect sensitive law enforcement information, or because a hearing might "defame, degrade, or incriminate the witness". However, authorizing resolutions for the inquiry might alter the procedures for allowing closed-door hearings. In practice, sometimes impeachment inquiries have had closed-door proceedings, and other times they have had open-door proceedings, while sometimes there has been a mix of both.

A committee tasked with running an impeachment inquiry may, after its investigation has been conducted and evidence submitted from other investigations has been reviewed, hold a meeting to consider articles of impeachment. This is referred to as a "markup". For any article of impeachment to advance from the committee to a full vote of the House, a simple majority vote of the committee is typically needed so that the committee can forward the article. The committee may forward multiple articles, with each one usually requiring a separate vote of the committee.

An impeachment inquiry, as opposed to an investigation not given that designation, may possibly be seen by courts as having a greater legally-required "legislative purpose" to access certain privileged materials. There is legal argument that impeachment inquiries may have a greater need for specific factual information than traditional congressional investigations. Furthermore, there is legal argument that the importance that impeachment plays as a constitutional role means to address misconduct of federal officials and upholding the balance of the separation of powers means that impeachment investigations need to be provided the strongest deference when balanced against confidentiality interests of the executive branch of the United States government. Federal courts, however, have ruled very little on how executive privilege relates to conventional congressional investigations or impeachment inquiries. The Supreme Court of the United States has never addressed the application of executive privilege to materials being sought for an impeachment investigation. There is some legal argument that courts have no role in adjudicating impeachment matters.

=== Notable examples ===
==== Presidential ====
Seven presidents of the United States have formally faced impeachment inquiries: John Tyler, James Buchanan, Andrew Johnson, Richard Nixon, Bill Clinton, Donald Trump, prior to his first impeachment (his second, which followed the January 6, 2021, Capitol riot, was not preceded by an inquiry)., and Joe Biden.

Unsuccessful House votes was also held against launching impeachment inquiry into one president, Thomas Jefferson.

===== Failed effort to launch an inquiry into Thomas Jefferson =====
On January 25, 1809, Representative Josiah Quincy III (a member of the Federalist Party) introduced resolutions which would launch an impeachment inquiry into lame duck President Thomas Jefferson, alleged that his keeping of Benjamin Lincoln in the federal office of the Port of Boston's customs collector despite Lincoln's own protests that he was too old and too weak to continue with his job had been a "high misdemeanor" on Jefferson's part. The resolution received immediate bipartisan resistance, and was rejected by a vote of 117–1.

===== John Tyler =====
In June 1842, the House voted 100–80 to accept the report of a committee headed by former president John Quincy Adams, which implied that President John Tyler should be impeached due to his use of his veto. On July 10, 1842, Representative John Botts, who opposed Tyler despite also being a member the same party Tyler had up until recently been a member of (the Whig Party), introduced the first resolution that levied a number of charges regarding Tyler's use of his veto power, and would create a nine-member committee to run an impeachment inquiry. The resolution, however, was defeated in a 127–83 vote on January 10, 1843.

===== James Buchanan =====
In 1860, the House created the United States House Select Committee to Investigate Alleged Corruptions in Government (also known as the "Covode Committee" after its chairman, Representative John Covode), to run an impeachment inquiry investigating President James Buchanan on suspicion of bribery and other allegations. After about a year of hearings, the committee concluded that Buchanan's actions did not merit impeachment.

===== Andrew Johnson =====
On January 7, 1867, the House voted to approve a resolution by James Mitchell Ashley which launched the first impeachment inquiry into Andrew Johnson. This inquiry was run by the House Committee on the Judiciary. The inquiry initially ended in a June 3, 1867, vote by the committee to recommend against forwarding articles of impeachment to the full House. however, on November 25, 1867, the House Committee on the Judiciary, which had not previously forwarded the result of its inquiry to the full House, reversed their previous decision, and voted 5–4 to recommend impeachment proceedings. In a December 7, 1867, vote, the full House rejected this report's recommendation by a 108–57 vote.

On January 27, 1868, the House approved, in a 99–31 vote, a resolution by Rufus P. Spalding which ordered,

That the Committee on Reconstruction be authorized to inquire what combinations have been made or attempted to be made to obstruct the due execution of the laws, and to that end the committee have power to send for persons and papers and to examine witnesses on oath, and report to this House what action, if any, they may deem necessary, and that said committee have leave to report at any time.

This vote launched the second impeachment inquiry into Andrew Johnson, run through the United States House Select Committee on Reconstruction. During this inquiry, on February 21, 1868, Johnson attempted to replace Edward M. Stanton with Lorenzo Thomas. That same day, Thaddeus Stevens submitted a resolution resolving that the evidence taken on impeachment by the previous impeachment inquiry run by the Committee on the Judiciary be referred to the Committee on Reconstruction, and that the committee "have leave to report at any time", which was approved by the House. On February 22, 1868, Stevens presented from the Committee on Reconstruction a report opining that Johnson should be impeached for high crimes and misdemeanors and an amended impeachment resolution. On February 24, 1868, the House voted to impeach Johnson. This was the first time that a president of the United States had been impeached.

In a rare United States instance of an impeachment-related investigation being launched after an impeachment vote has already occurred, in the waning days of the impeachment trial of Andrew Johnson, the House launched an investigation by the prosecutors of Johnson's trial into potential corruption related to the trial vote.

===== Richard Nixon =====
The next president to face a formal impeachment inquiry was Richard Nixon, more than nine decades after Johnson. Before the formal impeachment inquiry, Nixon faced related investigation into Watergate scandal and other actions in both houses of the United States Congress. The United States Senate had voted 77–0 on February 7, 1973, to form a select committee to investigate the Watergate scandal, and the resulting hearings were broadcast on television, running from May 17 through August 7, 1973. On October 3, 1973, the House Committee on the Judiciary held a committee vote in which they voted in a 20–17 party-line vote (with all Democrats voting yes and all Republicans voting no) to begin consideration of the possible impeachment of Nixon (a Republican), thus informally starting the impeachment process against Richard Nixon. They began the investigation in earnest in December 1973, after the House completed the confirmation hearings on Gerald Ford's nomination to become vice president.

On February 6, 1974, the House voted 410–4 to authorize the House Judiciary Committee to run a formal impeachment inquiry into Nixon. The committee sent three articles of impeachment against the president to the House in late July 1974. President Nixon resigned from office on August 9, 1974, before the House could vote on the articles of impeachment.

===== Bill Clinton =====
In 1997, the United States of House of Representatives authorized the impeachment inquiry into Bill Clinton. The Clinton inquiry followed an investigation by an independent counsel. Run the by the House Committee on the Judiciary, the inquiry led to the impeachment of Bill Clinton.

===== Donald Trump =====
On the evening of September 24, 2019, House Speaker Nancy Pelosi announced that six committees of the House of Representatives would begin a formal impeachment inquiry into President Trump. Pelosi accused Trump of betraying his oath of office, U.S. national security, and the integrity of the country's elections. The six committees were Financial Services, the Judiciary, Intelligence, Foreign Affairs, Oversight and Reform, and Ways and Means.

On December 5, Speaker Pelosi authorized the Judiciary Committee to begin drafting articles of impeachment. On December 10, 2019, Democrats on the House Judiciary Committee announced they would levy two articles of impeachment, designated H. Res. 755: (1) abuse of power, and (2) obstruction of Congress, On February 5, 2020, the Senate acquitted Trump on both counts. The votes were 48–52 to convict on the first count and 47–53 to convict on the second count, both short of the two-thirds majority needed to convict, therefore resulting in acquittal. The votes were sharply divided along party lines.

===== Joe Biden =====
On September 12, 2023, facing pressure from right-wing Republican members of Congress, House Speaker Kevin McCarthy announced the launch of an impeachment inquiry into Joe Biden over allegations relating to his son Hunter Biden's foreign business deals. On December 13, 2023, the House held vote to formalize the impeachment inquiry.

==== Vice presidential ====
One vice president has faced an impeachment inquiry by personal request. Another had a personal request for one denied, and another had a vote to hold a formal impeachment inquiry be narrowly defeated.

In 1826, Vice President John C. Calhoun himself requested a House impeachment inquiry be launched into him regarding allegations that he had profited from a contract during his tenure as United States secretary of war. His request was granted, and a House select committee conducted an impeachment inquiry which, in only a matter of weeks, found Calhoun innocent of wrongdoing.

In 1873, Vice President Schuyler Colfax's name surfaced during witness testimony in a House investigation of the Crédit Mobilier of America scandal. Under this cloud of suspicion, on February 20, 1873 (less than a month before Colfax's term expired), Representative Fernando Wood introduced a resolution to investigate the vice president's conduct. The House voted 105 to 109 not to consider it. James Noble Tyner, then, presented a second resolution which would refer the testimony to the House Committee on the Judiciary "with instructions to inquire whether anything in such testimony warrants articles of impeachment of any officer of the United States not a Member of this House, or makes it proper that further investigation should be ordered in this case." This second resolution was agreed to without debate or division. On February 24, Benjamin Butler submitted the committee's report. Debate was held briefly on February 24, before being postponed to February 26. It does not appear that debate was ever taken up again. The main reasons why both either official impeachment inquiry or impeachment failed to arise in this instance believed to be that the controversy in question took place during Colfax's tenure as a representative (not as vice president), and because when the actions became known only a few weeks remained before Colfax's term expired.

On September 26, 1973, a request by Vice President Spiro Agnew that an impeachment inquiry into him be launched was denied by Speaker of the House Carl Albert. Agnew had requested such an inquiry to investigate charges that he had received bribes from construction companies during his tenure as the governor of Maryland. Angew cited the precedent in which Calhoun had requested and been granted an impeachment inquiry into himself in 1826. Agnew had hoped that a House investigation could serve as an alternate to a grand jury investigation and court litigation. Speaker Albert discussed Agnew's requested inquiry with House Democratic leaders and House Parliamentarian Lewis Deschler, before deciding against granting one to Angew. Weeks later, on October 10, 1973, as part of a plea bargain relating to a charge of tax evasion, Vice President Agnew resigned.

In June 2023, representative Andy Ogles filed articles of impeachment for Kamala Harris.

==== Other notable examples ====
Other notable examples include the impeachment inquiry into Supreme Court Justice Samuel Chase, which led to up to his impeachment.

== State ==
=== Notable examples ===
In Oklahoma's early state history, impeachment inquiries against governors of Oklahoma by the Oklahoma House of Representatives were commonplace.

On December 16, 2008, the Illinois House of Representatives launched an unprecedented impeachment inquiry into Illinois Governor Rod Blagojevich. The inquiry was run by a bipartisan committee which the Illinois House of Representatives voted 113–0 to create and task with recommending whether Blagojevich should be impeached due to corruption charges. On January 8, 2009, the committee recommended impeachment. The following day, the Illinois House of Representatives voted 114–1 to impeach Blagojevich. Afterwards, and the Illinois Senate voted 59–0 to remove Blagojevich from office on January 29, 2009.

In July 2016, the Alabama House of Representatives Judiciary Committee named a special counsel to lead an impeachment inquiry into Alabama Governor Robert J. Bentley related to allegations that Bentley was involved in an extramarital affair with a female political adviser. In April 2017, Bentley resigned from office.

In 2021, an impeachment inquiry was run by the New York State Assembly's Judiciary Committee against New York Governor Andrew Cuomo regarding alleged sexual misconduct. By early August 2021, it was indicated that articles of impeachment were soon considered by the committee. On August 10, 2021, Cuomo announced his intent to resign from office effective two weeks subsequent.

In 2022, an impeachment inquiry was held by the South Dakota House Select Committee on Investigation as to whether South Dakota Attorney General Jason Ravnsborg should be impeached over his involvement in a fatal 2020 car crash. On March 28, 2022, the House Select Committee on Investigation concluded the inquiry after several months with a recommendation against impeaching Ravnsborg. Nevertheless, a special legislative session was held for the full South Dakota House to determine whether to impeach Ravnsborg. On April 12, 2022, Ravnsborg was impeached by the South Dakota House. On June 21, 2022, the South Dakota Senate voted to convict Ravnsborg on two impeachment charges, removing him from office.

== See also ==
- United States House Judiciary Task Force on Judicial Impeachment
