= 1868 impeachment managers investigation =

Andrew Johnson prosecution report

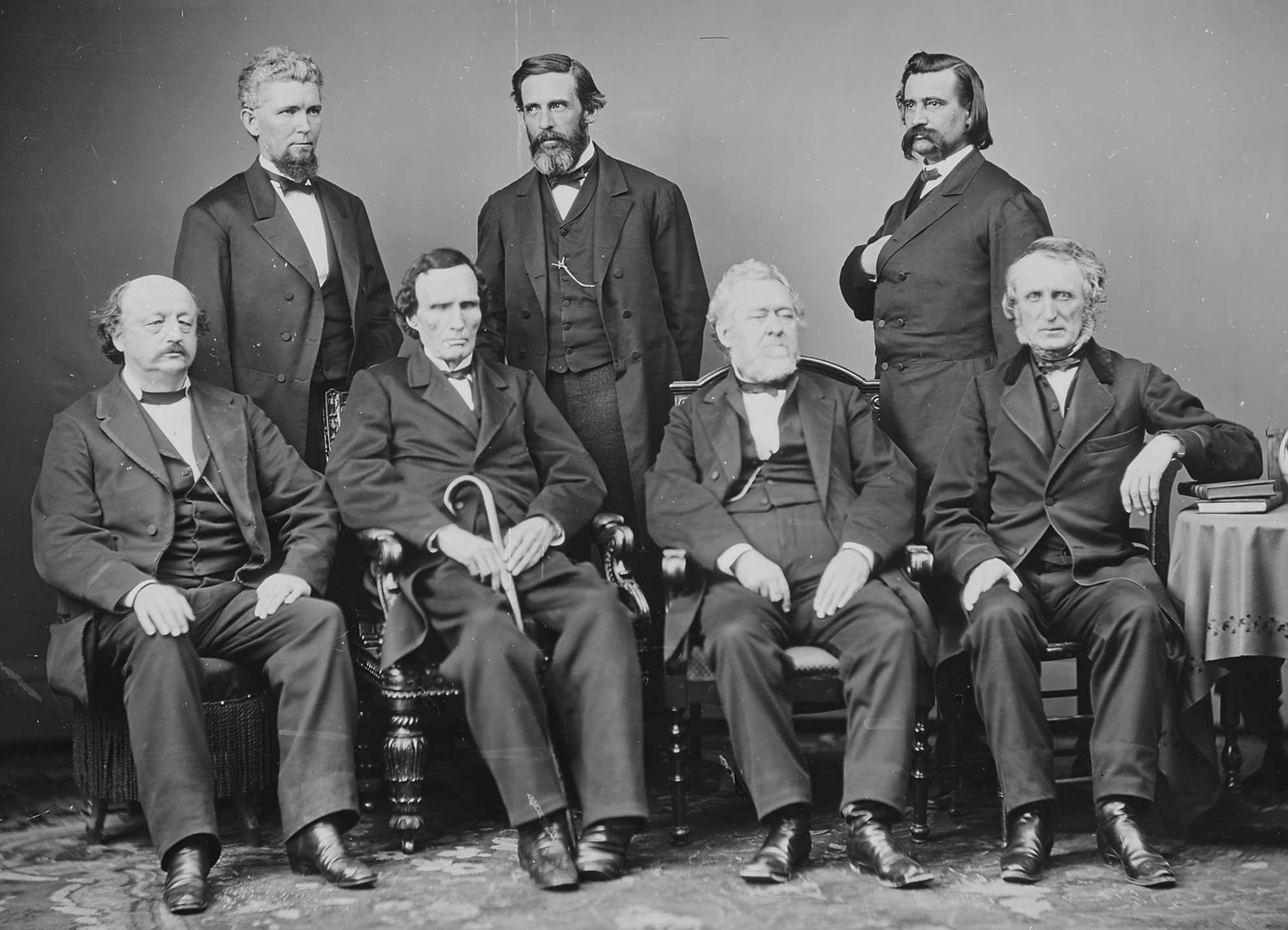
- The impeachment managers for the impeachment trial of Andrew Johnson (the group which ran the investigation)
- Formation: May 16, 1868 (investigation authorized)
- Dissolved: July 3, 1868 (final report published)
- Type: United States House of Representatives-authorized investigation
- Purpose: To investigate possible "improper or corrupt means" to influence the vote of U.S. senators in the impeachment trial of Andrew Johnson
- Members: The impeachment managers for the impeachment trial of Andrew Johnson: John Bingham; George S. Boutwell; Benjamin Butler; John A. Logan; Thaddeus Stevens; Thomas Williams; James F. Wilson

On May 16, 1868, the United States House of Representatives authorized the impeachment managers (prosecutors) of the impeachment trial of Andrew Johnson to conduct an investigation into possible "improper or corrupt means" to influence the vote of members of the United States Senate in the impeachment trial. The investigation was launched before the adjournment of the trial and continued after the trial adjourned on May 26, 1868. The leading figure of the investigation was Benjamin Butler. The final report of the investigation was published on July 3, 1868.

== Background ==
On February 21, 1868, in disregard for the Tenure of Office Act, Andrew Johnson (the president of the United States) attempted to replace Edwin Stanton (the United States secretary of war) with Lorenzo Thomas. This led the United States House of Representatives, on February 24, to impeach Johnson. After the impeachment, an impeachment trial began in the United States Senate where the Senate would judge whether to convict Johnson, thereby removing him from office.

While the investigation never proved bribery, there is evidence of efforts by both those supporting the prosecution and the defense having made offers to senators to persuade their votes. This includes evidence of promises of patronage jobs, cash bribes, and political dealmaking being made to solicit votes for acquittal. There is evidence that the prosecution may have attempted to bribe the senators voting for acquittal to switch their votes to conviction. For instance, Maine Senator Fessenden was offered the ministership to Great Britain, and it was found that impeachment manager Butler said, "Tell [Kansas Senator Ross] that if he wants money there is a bushel of it here to be had."

There is historical evidence suggesting the existence a bribery scheme to secure Johnson's acquittal that involved (among others):

- General Alonzo W. Adams
- Alexander Randall (Wisconsin politician) (postmaster general of the United States and former governor of Wisconsin)
- Sheridan Shook (chief revenue collector of New York, member of the New York Board of Supervisors, and associate of Thurlow Weed)
- Henry A. Smythe, (collector of the Port of New York)
- Thurlow Weed (a New York state assemblyman and powerful political boss and newspaper publisher)
- Samuel Ward (a lobbyist)
- Erastus Webster (a revenue official in New York and former personal secretary to the United States secretary of state, William H. Seward)
- Charles Woolley (a lawyer that was a Johnson ally)

Aspects of this possible scheme were partially uncovered by the investigation, but it was never proven by the investigation. All of the individuals, except for Wooley, had ties to United States Secretary of State William H. Seward, who also appears implicated in this scheme. Evidence also suggests that Alexander Randall and Edmund Cooper (a leader at the United States Department of the Treasury) were possibly in charge of managing an "acquittal fund" for Johnson.

== Authorization of investigation ==
On May 16, 1868, the Senate voted against convicting Johnson on the eleventh article of impeachment, which had been considered the article with the strongest chance of securing a conviction. It fell one vote shy of the two-thirds needed for impeachment, with the vote to convict being 32–21. After this, the Senate voted to adjourn the trial and reconvene to resume voting on the remaining ten articles of impeachment on March 26, 1868.

Also on May 16, 1868, the House voted 88–14 to approve a resolution introduced by impeachment manager John Bingham (R– OH) that enabled the impeachment managers to investigate alleged "improper or corrupt means used to influence the determination of the Senate" and to appoint sub-committees to take testimony, with the stipulation that expenses of the investigation would be paid for from the contingent fund of the House. This resolution had been justified by the impeachment managers with the claim that information had been provided to them that provided them with probable cause to suspect improper or corrupt means had influenced the Senate vote. After the resolution passed, a subcommittee was created and began hearing testimony during the hiatus. The investigation that subsequently unfolded proved relatively extreme and unconstrained.

== Before the adjournment of the impeachment trial ==
The leading force of the investigation was Benjamin Butler (R– MA). The impeachment managers, during the hiatus between votes, began searching for possible corrupt means that may have persuaded senators to acquit. The investigation took a heavy-handed prosecutorial approach, subpoenaing telegrams, and looking into the bank accounts of private citizens that just-so happened to have withdrawn large amounts. Butler was confident that votes had been bought by Johnson allies, and wanted to prove it.

The effort was disparaged as a "smelling committee" by Democrats and some of the press. Many Republicans were also dubious towards the investigation. While there is substantial evidence to suggest that there were several senators that voted to convict who Johnson could likely have counted on to vote for an acquittal had their votes been needed, only those who actually voted to convict were the focus of the impeachment managers' investigation.

Among the telegrams found were a number that seemed incriminating. Hours before the vote on May 16 to acquit, Charles Woolley sent Congressman George H. Pendleton (D– OH) a telegram reading, "Andy all right." Many witnesses testified that they had heard talk of vote-purchasing, but many of these witnesses were also unable to recall who they heard it from or greater details about what they had heard. Within hours of the authorization of the investigation, the impeachment managers had subpoenaed eight witnesses, including Senator Edmund G. Ross (who had voted to acquit), Perry Fuller (an Indian trader and a political fixer), and several individuals from Missouri that had tried unsuccessfully to convince John B. Henderson to vote for a conviction. That evening, the committee began hearing testimony, with their first witness being Senator Ross' brother William, who expressed disappointment in his brother's vote but denied any knowledge of corruption in the Senate vote.

The impeachment managers received a large number of tips from people around the country of leads they should pursue. However, the individual who had Butler's ear the most with his advice on this was National Police Gazette-publisher George Wilkes. Wilkes' newspaper was known to scandalmonger. Wilkes had a secret informant that was close to Samuel Ward (a notable lobbyist). This source reported that Ward had paid Senator Edmund G. Ross for his vote to acquit with $12,000 from Democratic congressman John Morrissey. Wilkes speculated that the transfer of money was handled by "Charley Morgan", who was a cross-dresser who was allegedly involved in separate extramarital affairs with both Morrissey's wife and Samuel Ward. During the middle of the investigation, a young woman going by the name "Charley Morgan" was arrested in New York, pleading guilty to a misdemeanor charge of "indecency" for crossdressing. She told the court that she had gone four years without wearing women's clothing. Butler, however, gave assurances to Ward that this was not his doing, pointing to the fact that he had gone against pressure to embarrass Ward by calling her as a witness in the investigation. Butler would never find proof that Ward had bribed Ross.

The investigation included a focus on a number of Johnson-allied figures, including Thurlow Weed and Charles Woolley.

Thurlow Weed told the committee that there had been a group that was determined to secure Johnson's acquittal. He said that Henry A. Smyhe, was a member of this group. Smythe was an individual that had been accused of corruption in the past, and had previously nearly been ejected from office as a result. Weed also said that it included Sheridan Shook, former congressman Samuel S. Cox, and Samuel Ward.

During the investigation, there was evidence found that United States Secretary of State William Seward and Postmaster General Alexander Randall had been in contact with Cornelius Wendell (a Washington printer) for the purposes of organizing bribes. Wendell. Wendell told the committee that he had been uninterested in being part of this plan, and pointed blame on Seward's aide Erastus Webster, who it appeared had collected a fund of $165,000 for the purposes of buying acquittal votes. This money was said to have primarily been raised by Randall, Hugh McCulloch (United States secretary of the treasury) and Henry A. Smythe through middlemen such as Perry Fuller and James Legate (a special agent of the Kansas Post Office Department), though Fuller and Legate were said to have pocketed most of the money raised for themselves. Wendell also testified about Charles Woolley's alleged involvement.

James Legate testified that Perry Fuller had told him that, if impeachment failed, Salmon Chase (the chief Justice of the United States, who acted as the trial's presiding officer) would run a third-party campaign for the presidency. He also said that the raising of money for a potential Chase presidential bid was being used as a front for establishing a fund to support the acquittal of Johnson.

Among the other individuals interviewed was Thomas Ewing Jr.

Much evidence implicated Senator Samuel C. Pomeroy, who had voted to convict, in possible corruption. Butler attempted to ignore this evidence, however. The investigation uncovered evidence that there had been discussions of bribes for votes to convict. It was discovered during the investigation that Kansas Senator Pomeroy, who voted for conviction, had written a letter to Johnson's postmaster general seeking a $40,000 bribe for Pomeroy's acquittal vote along with three or four others in his caucus.

Woolley became a central focus of Butler's from the first day of the trial. The impeachment managers sought to hear from Woolley, who kept giving changing excuses for inability to come before them. Among the matters they had questions for Woolley about was $10,000 that he had received from Sheridan Shook, a deputy collector of internal revenue in New York. Woolley had withdrawn the money in $1,000 bills, which drew suspicion. When he appeared himself, Shook answered very few questions in his testimony before the committee, and many of his answers were seen as nonsensical. Other witnesses on this matter had feigned ignorance or had been otherwise evasive in their answers to questions. On the evening of March 25, Nehemiah G. Ordway (the sergeant at arms of the House) took custody of Woolley and brought him before the House on March 26. However, Woolley's appearance was interrupted that day by a recess so that congressmen could attend the Senate impeachment trial vote that day.

The committee submitted a report on their preliminary findings on May 26, hours before the Senate met again to vote on articles of impeachment. While some senators attempted to get the trial to adjourn until the end of June to allow the impeachment managers more time to investigate before the vote. This was rejected because few others believed that the allegations could be proven. The Senate voted identically on the second and third articles of impeachment, again by 32–21 votes before voting to adjourn sine die.

== After the adjournment of the impeachment trial ==
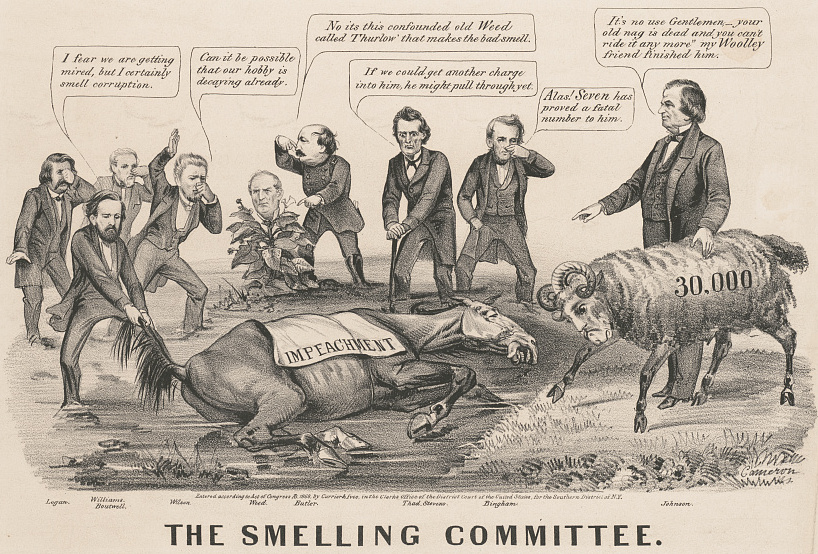
Political cartoon by John Cameron depicting the "smelling committee". Description: Individuals depicted in the illustration (left to right) are: John A. Logan, George S. Boutwell, Thomas Williams, James F. Wilson, Thurlow Weed, Benjamin F. Butler, Thaddeus Stevens, John A. Bingham, and Andrew Johnson. •Impeachment itself is illustrated as an idiomatic "dead horse" •Boutwell pulls the tail of the horse, saying, "I fear we are getting mired, but I certainly smell corruption." •Wilson wonders, "Can it be possible that our hobby is decaying already." •Butler replies, pointing to Thurlow Weed (depicted as a head growing out of a plant in a double-entendre of his last name and the word "weed"), "No its this confounded old Weed called Thurlow that makes the bad smell." •Stevens remarks, "If we could get another charge into him, he might pull through yet." •Bingham remarks, "Alas! Seven had proved a fatal number to him." (referring to the seven Republican senators that received the most blame for voting to acquit). •Johnson, accompanied by an anthropomorphic-looking ram (a reference to Charles Woolley due to the similarity of his surname and the word "wool") remarks, "It's no use Gentlemen, your old nag is dead and you can't ride it any more' my Woolley friend finished him."

On March 26, 1868, after the trial adjourned, the House voted 91–30 to approve a resolution presented by Benjamin Butler authorizing the House impeachment managers to continue this investigation. Butler led the continuation of the investigation and conducted hearings and inquiry into widespread reports that Republican senators had been bribed to vote for Johnson's acquittal.

On March 26, shortly after the Senate trial adjourned, the impeachment managers returned to question Charles Woolley. He failed to cooperate with their questioning, refusing to answer questions that he asserted were unrelated to the trial. This included questions about what he had done with $10,000 that he had received from a deputy collector of internal revenue in New York named Sheridan Shook. After this, House voted 60–51 that day to hold him in contempt of Congress and had him held in custody by the sergeant at arms of the House. He was first kept in the House Committee on Foreign Affairs' hearing room, but, as his arrest grew in length, he was later moved to the basement room that Vinnie Ream had been utilizing as a sculpture studio, forcing the artist to move her work into the hallway. Conservatives charged that Benjamin Butler was intentionally targeting Ream in his successful resolution to turn her studio into a Capitol Police guardroom. Woolley's arrest attracted great media attention.

When Woolley was questioned on May 27, he was denied a request for a lawyer. Butler found him still inadequately responsive to questions, and sent him back to his holding cell. An alibi witness of Woolley's, Ransom Van Valkenberg, told the committee that he and Woolley had made a $10,000 bet on the upcoming 1868 United States presidential election, and that the bettors asked Sheridan Shook to hold the stakes, that Shook and Woolley had been immensely drunk, so Van Valkenberg had taken Woolley's money at put it in a safe at the Metropolitan Hotel. The final report Butler wrote doubted this, calling it a, "stupid fabrication". Eleven days later, Woolley told that house he would answer Butler's questions, and Butler questioned him again. Van Valkenberg came before the committee again, with $17,000 of cash and accompanied by a hotel manager who told the impeachment managers that this money had indeed been in a hotel safe. It was impossible to prove whether this was Woolley's money or not. After he appeared before the investigative committee and answered their questions to an extent that they found satisfactory, the House voted to discharge Woolley from their custody on June 11, 1868.

The impeachment managers took testimony for a total of six weeks the May 16 authorization of their investigation. In some instances, Butler individually interrogated witnesses. During these six weeks, Butler had detectives search for proof of bribery. There was some speculation that Butler was motivated by a desire to not be blamed himself for the failure to secure a conviction. It was rumored, however, that Butler hidden thirty-six volumes of incriminating telegrams in hopes he could later use them to blackmail congressional colleagues in the future. It was also rumored that Butler had offered $100,000 to Cornelius Wendell in exchange for information, but had suppressed evidence of this offer. Butler dismissed all of this.

In the post-trial hearings and investigations there was growing evidence that some acquittal votes were acquired by promises of patronage jobs and cash bribes. Political deals were struck as well. James W. Grimes received assurances that acquittal would not be followed by presidential reprisals; Johnson agreed to enforce the Reconstruction Acts, and to appoint General John Schofield to succeed Stanton. Nonetheless, the investigations never resulted in charges, much less convictions, against anyone. The investigation also boomeranged by uncovering evidence that there had been discussions of bribes for vote to covict. It was discovered during the investigation that Kansas Senator Pomeroy, who voted for conviction, had written a letter to Johnson's postmaster general seeking a $40,000 bribe for Pomeroy's acquittal vote along with three or four others in his caucus.

Democrats were not worried by the investigation, and came to see it as amusing due to Butler's failure to find hard evidence of bribery. It was reported that the impeachment managers had testimony showing implications of bribery, but did not provide solid evidence of bribery.

In contrast the strictness that Woolley had faced, the impeachment managers were more lax when it came to the testimony of some witnesses. A number of witnesses were allowed to decline to answer questions, be evasive, or contradict evidence without consequence. Some witnesses faced informal questioning that was not under oath. Samuel Ward smoked cigars with Butler after he testified before the committee for two hours. After General Alonzo W. Adams, being questioned for allegedly originating a bribery scheme, gave what the impeachment managers found to be an "utterly false and untruthful" claim by declaring he could not recall at what time he had become a general, Butler did not pursue any action against him. Butler, perhaps, was selective with what truths he sought to uncover in the investigation, hoping only to find those that would harm the president and the Democratic Party and help the Republicans. Even when it came to matters he wanted to uncover, Butler appears to have been selective in which leads he chose to follow, disregarding some leads more that were potentially promising than the ones he chose to follow.

Butler suspected that Senator Joseph S. Fowler as having been bribed for his vote against impeachment. Seven congressmen gave a statement that, in January 1868, Fowler had demanded the impeachment of Johnson. He also suspected John B. Henderson, who had promised to vote to convict on the eleventh article four days before he voted to acquit on it. He also suspected Enmund Ross.

There is historical evidence that Perry Fuller had bribed Senator Ross. However, Butler never managed to prove this act of bribery. Fuller admitted that, at the authority of Edmund Cooper, he had offered $40,000 to Senator Samuel C. Pomeroy's brother-in-law Willis Gaylord. In late-May 1868, amid the investigation, he acknowledged having paid for the outstanding expense of the home mortgage of James Legate. It appears that Legate had also given Fuller his records of the bribery scheme, and that Fuller had burned them. Historical evidence shows that Fuller had admitted to doing so in hopes of, "drying up the investigation".

== Publication of final report ==
Being unable to definitively prove that bribery took place, Butler wrote a final report on the evidence found and testimony taken by the impeachment managers in their investigation. Butler rushedly published the final report of the investigation on July 3, 1868. He hoped that this would hurt Johnson's prospects at the Democratic Party's presidential nomination at the 1868 Democratic National Convention held in New York City the following week. Senators suspected of selling their acquittal votes attacked the report on the Senate floor. Ross attacked what he called Butler's, "well-known groveling instincts and proness to slime and uncleanness".

== Aftermath ==
Eighteen months after the end of the trial, journalist Henry V. Boynton published an investigative news report that sought to tie up loose ends in Butler's investigation. He identified three different alleged bribery schemes. Boynton was unhappy with Butler's handling of the impeachment managers' investigation, believing his pursuit of Woolley had been to the detriment of pursuing other guilty parties. He was also angered by Butler's failure to publish important testimony from the investigation. Cornelius Wendell gave a news interview that confirmed aspects of Boynton's reporting, and which accused Perry Fuller of offering Senator Ross several thousand dollars to influence his vote. Fuller denied this.

Few transcripts of testimony from the investigation survive.

== See also ==
- Impeachment inquiry in the United States
- Impeachment investigation
