= Louis Aldrich =

American actor

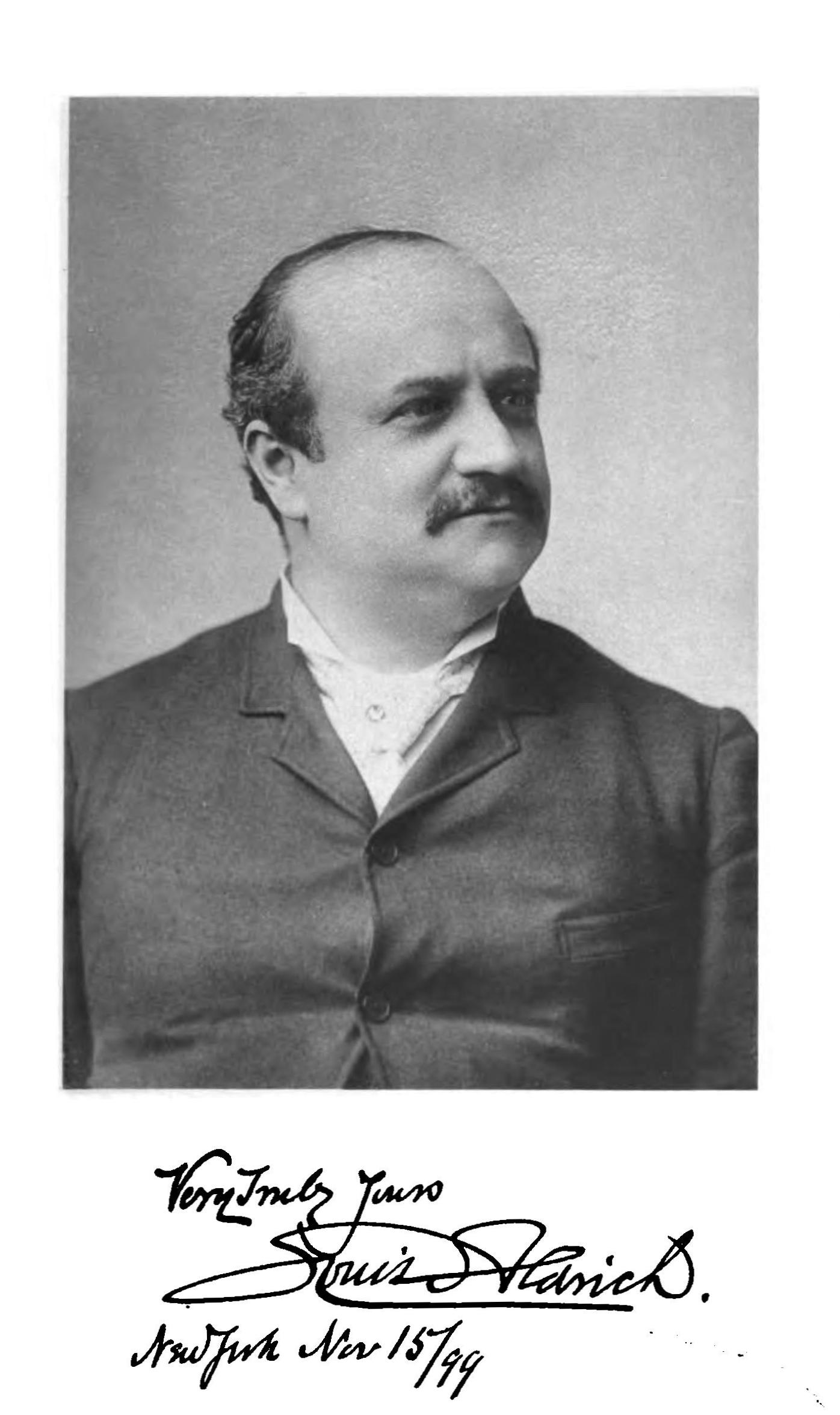
- Louis Aldrich 1899
- Born: October 1, 1843
- Died: June 17, 1901 (aged 57); Kennebunkport, Maine, U.S.
- Other names: Salma Lyon
- Occupation: Stage actor

Louis Aldrich, né Salma Lyon, (October 1, 1843 – June 17, 1901) was a stage actor who later became president of the Actors' Fund of America.

== Biography ==
Aldrich was born on 1 October 1843. According to a 1913 profile in The New York Clipper, he was born "on the state line" of Ohio. However, George Earlie Shankle records in his 1955 book on American nicknames that Aldrich was born at sea while his mother was sailing from Germany to the United States. Shankle also writes that Aldrich was later adopted by a family living in Cincinnati, Ohio. He attended Whitewater College in Wayne County, Indiana, through 1857.

=== Career as child actor ===
He went on tour as a child actor playing Richard III, Macbeth, and Shylock, Claude Melnotte, Young Norval and other heroes of the classic drama before 1857, being billed under various titles, such as "The Ohio Roscius" and "The Boy Prodigy." His name was Salma Lyon, but he finally took Louis Aldrich as his legal and professional designation.

He joined the juvenile March Players of St. Louis, Missouri, from 1858 through 1863, being billed as "Master Louis"; went with them in 1860 to California; and thence to Australia and New Zealand, where they remained two years and a half. In 1863 the troupe returned to California and disbanded after playing in San Francisco for four weeks.

He then joined Maguire's Opera House Company in San Francisco, California. He remained there from 1863 through 1866.

=== Boston Theatre ===
He became a member of the stock company at the Boston Theatre in March 1866, opening as Nathan to the Leah of Ellen Bateman. Frank Mayo had been cast for the part, and his name appeared on the posters, but at the last moment, Aldrich took his place. He remained at the Boston Theatre for eight seasons, playing in the many old plays revived at that house, and supporting Forrest, Booth, Cushman, and others in leading roles. In 1870 he appeared in Armadale. He then played in Leah the Forsaken.

=== At home and on tour ===
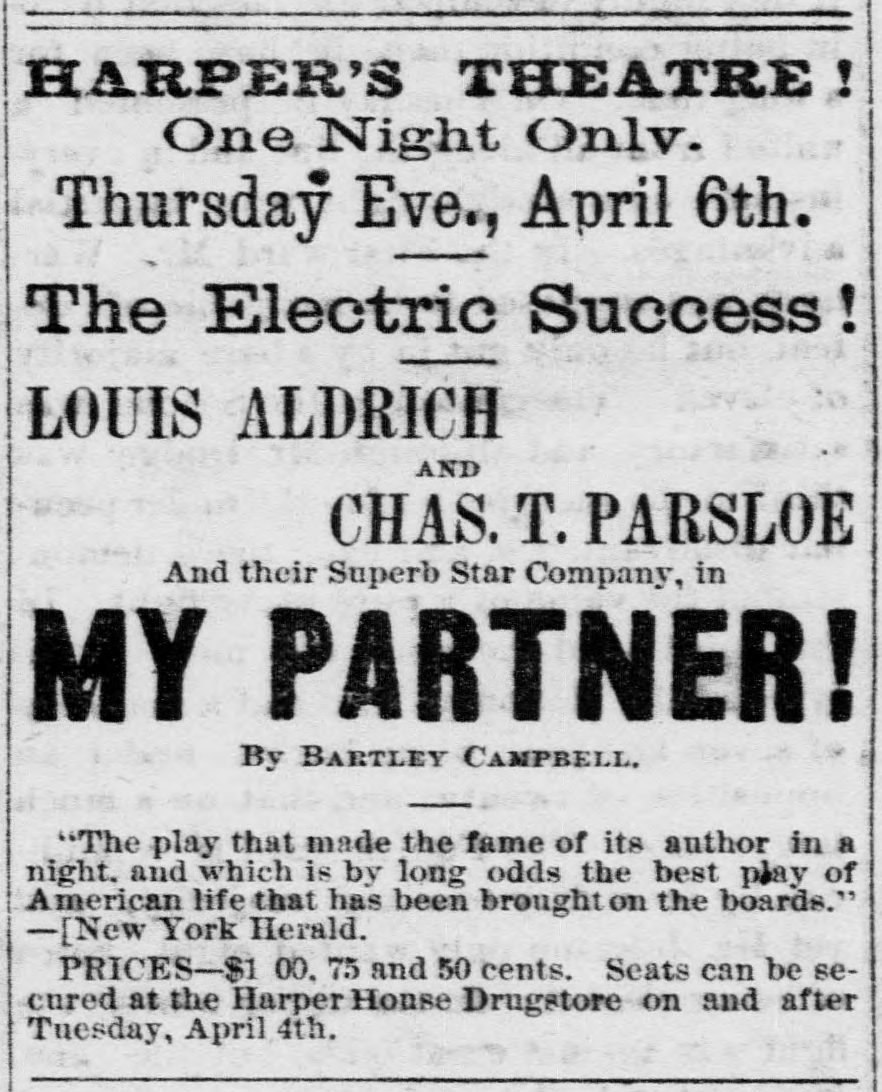
Louis Aldrich and Chas. T. Parsloe at the Harper′s Theatre, April 6th 1882

From 1873, He played successively in several companies; he became the leading man of Mrs. John Drew's company, the Arch Street Players, in Philadelphia, Pennsylvania, where he stayed through the following year; as a stock star at Wood's Museum in New York; with John T. Ford's company in Baltimore; at Booth's Theatre in New York, and for the seasons of 1877–78 and 1878–79 with McKee Rankin as Parson in The Danites. On August 22, 1879, he brought out Bartley Campbell's My Partner at the Union Square Theatre in New York, playing Joe Saunders; and, in connection with Charles T. Parsloe, continued to present that melodrama for the season after season in almost every city and town in the United States through 1885. On September 11, 1888, he produced The Kaffir Diamond at the new Broadway Theatre in New York, and two years later starred in The Editor.

=== With Rose Eytinge ===
In the season of 1892–93, he played General Colgate in Augustus Thomas's war drama Surrender, under the management of Charles Frohman, the cast including Rose Eytinge, Maude Banks, W. H. Crompton, Burr Mcintosh, and Harry Woodruff. (Note: Eytinge tells an amusing tale about Aldrich, Though Louis Aldrich was in the fullest and freest sense of the term a legitimate actor, there is no denying that he was also an inveterate "guyer," and he could "guy" so artistically, with so serious a face and so dignified a port, with so much poise and self-possession, that while those in the scene with him would be convulsed with laughter, and would have much ado to hold themselves together, the audience would never for a moment suspect him. An example of this occurs to me. I was in the cast with him in a war-piece written by Augustus Thomas, called "Surrender." In this piece there was a court-martial, at which Mr. Aldrich enacted the part of the judge-advocate. There was an amusing interchange between the president of the court and the comedian. Now this comedian was a bit of a "guyer" himself, so they had several tilts. On this particular night, when the comedy man came up for examination, Mr. Aldrich straightened himself up, looked at the witness with severe, judicial dignity, and in a deep, portentous voice went on to say: "I know what you are about to tell me, sir. You would tell me," — and then proceeded to give the unfortunate wight's entire scene, gags and all. That comedian's face was a study." (Rose Eytinge (1905) The Memories of Rose Eytinge)) He subsequently appeared in Her Atonement and other plays, with occasional returns to his popular success My Partner.

In 1893 he appeared in "The Senator" at the Grand Opera House in New Bedford, Massachusetts.

=== Actors' Fund of America ===
In 1897, he became the president of the Actors' Fund of America, a position he remained in until the year of his death, 1901, in Kennebunkport, Maine.

== Bibliography ==
- Who's Who in America, Historical Voluma, 1607–1896. Chicago: Marquis Who's Who, 1967.
