= The Kaffir Diamond =

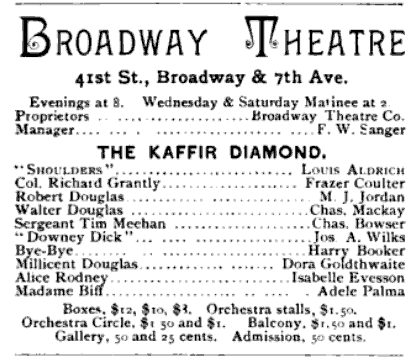
Opening night cast

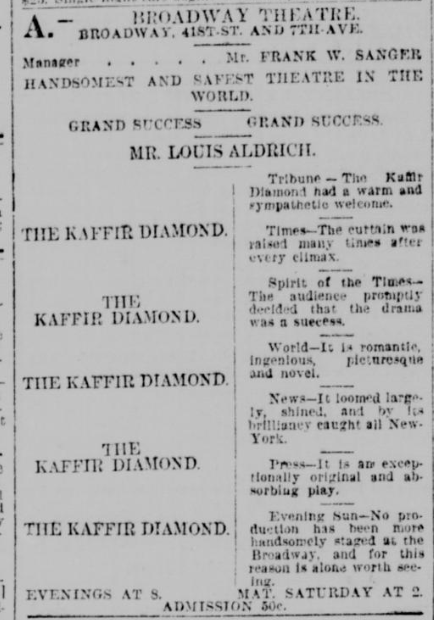
Advertisement for play in New York Tribune

The Kaffir Diamond is an 1888 play. It had its New York City debut at the former Broadway Theatre on September 11, 1888. Though the audience provided "unbounded applause" on opening night, reviews of the play were negative, and it played unsuccessfully for only five weeks, concluding on October 13, 1888.

The play was intended as a starring vehicle for Louis Aldrich. Edward J. Swartz, a Philadelphia newspaperman with the Philadelphia Evening Telegraph wrote the play, and David Belasco worked on revising it and assisted in getting the play staged.

== Original Broadway cast ==
- "Shoulders" by Louis Aldrich
- Col. Richard Grantly by Frazer Coulter
- Robert Douglas by M.J. Jordan
- Walter Douglas by Charles Mackay
- Sergeant Tim Meehan by Charles Bowser
- "Downey Dick" by Joseph A. Wilks
- Bye-Bye by Harry Booker
- Millicent Douglas by Dora Goldthwaite
- Alice Rodney by Isabelle Evesson
- Madame Biff by Adele Palma
