= Sheridan Shook =

American businessman and tax collector (d. 1899)

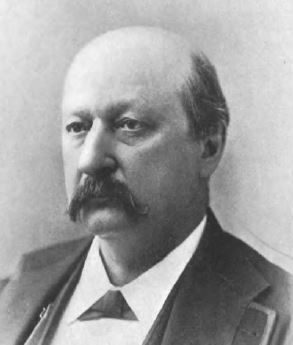

Sheridan Shook (d. 1899) was a businessman and tax collector who was prominent in New York City in the latter half of the 19th century.

== Early life ==
Shook was born in either Red Hook, New York or Red Bank, New Jersey. He grew up in Red Bank.

== Career ==
=== Business ===
Shook became a very wealthy man through business.

At the age of fourteen, Shook moved to New York City and began working for a butter and cheese merchant. Ten years later, when the merchant stepped down from his position as proprietor of the business, Shook took his place in operating the store.

In 1871, Shook constructed the Union Square Theater. He would be involved with the theater for the next ten years. He partnered with A.M. Palmer in its management, establishing the Shook & Palmer firm. Palmer had before this been Shook's clerk when Shook was a district collector of internal revenue. Palmer oversaw the artistic aspects of its operation. In 1875, the firm leased the Brooklyn Theatre, which they managed until it was lost in a very deadly fire the following year. After Shook's ex-wife became romantically involved with and married Palmer and divorced him to marry Palmer, Shook replaced Palmer as manager with James Collier. Collier had less success managing the theater. Shook retired from the theater business sometime thereafter.

Shook was also involved in the brewing industry with firm Shook & Everard, which was founded in 1876. In addition to having a brewing operation, Shook was also a wholesale liquor dealer. Shook partnered with John R. Nugent to own the Morton House hotel, which was housed in the same structure as the Union Square Theatre. Nugent and Shook worked as business associates for a long time.

=== Politics and government ===
Shook heavily involved himself in politics.

Shook first became involved in politics in New York City's Third Ward, where he was involved in the local Whig politics.

Shook became a dedicated member of the Republican Party from its inception. He was a delegate to the 1856 Republican National Convention. Shook would be an attendee of every Republican presidential convention until 1884, when illness prevented his attendance.

In 1859 he became the president of the New York Republican County Committee. He was an early supporter of Abraham Lincoln's successful 1860 presidential campaign.

During the tenure of Robert T. Haws and New York City comptroller, Shook was appointed the treasurer of New York City's relief fund. In 1861, Shook served as a New York City Supervisor.

In 1861, at the start of his presidency, President Lincoln appointed Shook to the important position of collector of internal revenue for the 22nd District, a district which included the lower section of New York City. The role's importance in large part came from the fact that the district covered Wall Street and the New York Stock Exchange, and as a result dealt with heavy amounts revenue under a federal revenue tax on broker sales. In 1869, President Ulysses S. Grant removed Shook from this position.

Shook was a close political associate of Thurlow Weed, Chester A. Arthur (U.S. president, 1881–1885), Thomas Murphy, Clarence W. Meade (police magistrate), John R. Nugent, and Jacob Hess (New York City police commissioner).

In 1868, the managers in the impeachment trial of President Andrew Johnson investigated a matter involving Shook, suspecting a bribery scheme to influence United States senators in the impeachment trial. Thurlow Weed testified that Shook had been part of a group that was determined to prevent a guilty vote against Johnson. The managers looked into $10,000 that Shook had given to attorney Charles Woolley, an ally of the president. Shook was questioned by the managers, but gave very few responses to their questions. Many of the answers he did give made little sense. The impeachment managers ultimately failed to prove a bribery scheme.

In 1884, Shook supported the presidential campaign of James G. Blaine, but was unable to attend the nominating convention due to illness. While Blaine was successful in securing the Republican nomination, he lost the general election.

In his later years, he served a long tenure as the representative to the state Republican Party's executive committee for the fifteenth assembly district. He was well-trusted source of advice by those working for the party.

== Personal life ==
In approximately 1866, Shook married Laura Adelize Mowbray, who he had met while she was working as the superintendent of the St. Nicholas Hotel. They had two children together. Around 1879, they began experiencing trouble in their marriage and ultimately divorced. After Shook and his wife divorced, she remarried to Shook's business partner A. M. Palmer.

Shook maintained a part-time residence at the Morton House hotel which he was the co-proprietor of. He frequently socialized in the hotel's bar. He also was a part-time resident of a farm he owned near Kinderhook, New York.

Around 1887, Shook married his second wife.

After his death, the Philadelphia Times recounted that he had been a heavy drinker of alcoholic drinks (preferring gin) and also a frequent gambler.

Shook died at a personal residence of his in Red Hook, New York on April 27, 1899 at approximately 77 years of age. He had been suffering serious illness for the two months preceding his death, and his death had been expected as a result.
