= Rainy Day Club =

American women's organization

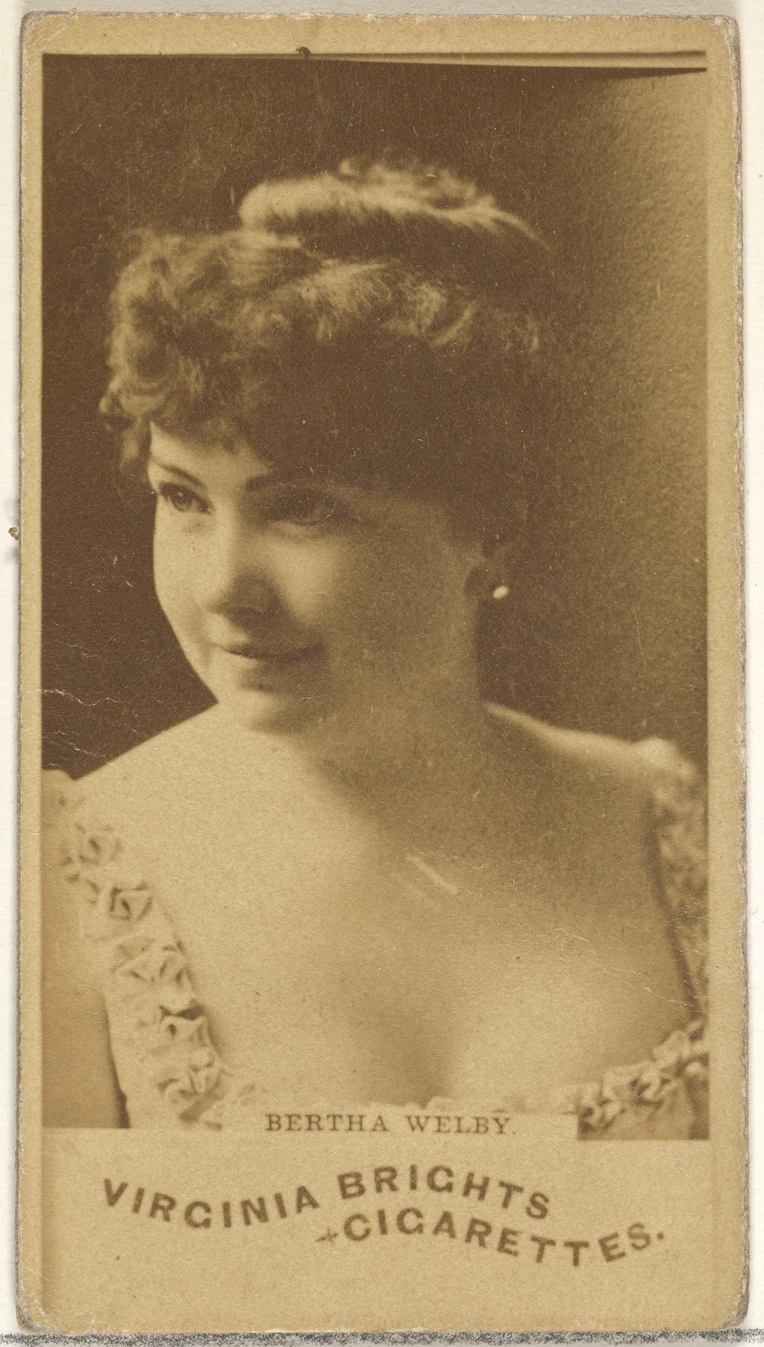
Bertha Welby

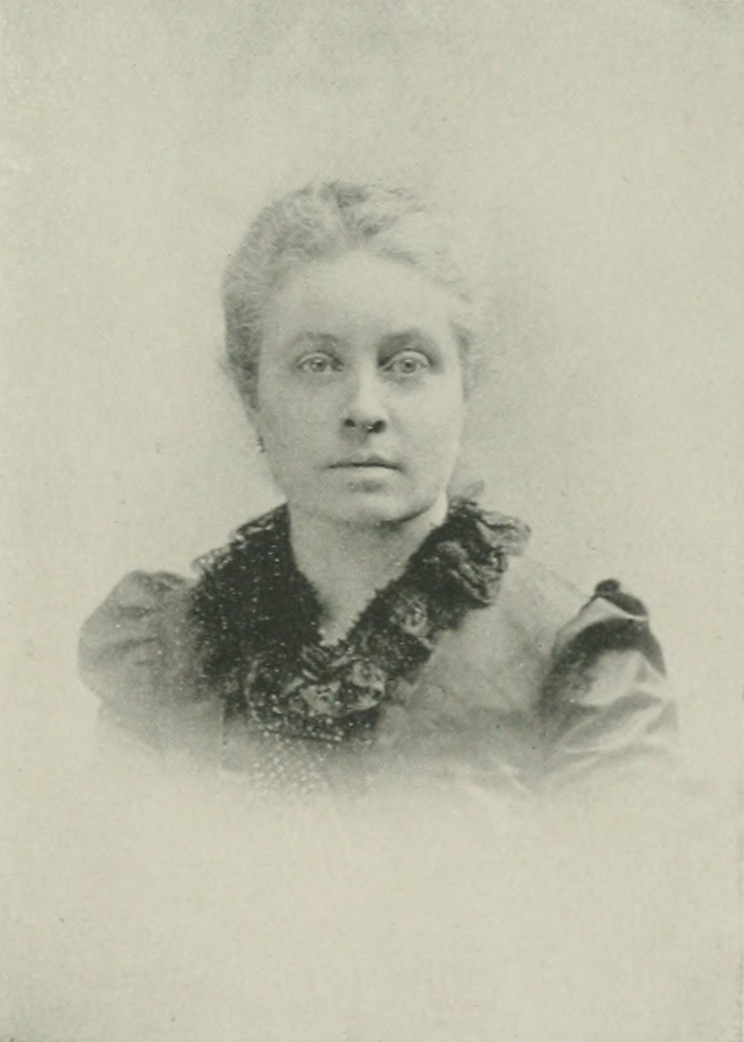
Emma Beckwith

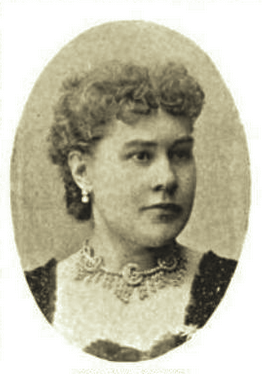
Mrs. A. M. Palmer

Rainy Day Club was an American woman's organization founded by Bertha Welby in New York City, on November 5, 1896. The club's first president was Emma Beckwith. Subsequently, for 25 years, Mrs. A. M. Palmer served in that role.

All members of the Rainy Day Club had to pledge themselves to wear rainy-day dress in inclement weather, the object of the organization being to introduce sanitary methods in dress, as well as to promote sanitary reforms in homes. It was the revolutionary effect of the bicycle that made this fashion movement possible. Club members denied that there would be a sacrifice of "prettiness" in the new costume. Some women seemed to think that the advantages in convenience and comfort of the costumes the club was favoring would be counterbalanced by the loss in attractiveness. However, the new dress would not be ugly. It would be a dainty, light-weight skirt reaching to the shoe-tops, perfectly fitting boots with tops two inches higher than usual. Each woman could decide for herself as to the waist, and could make her costume as attractive as any she wears.

== History ==
The Rainy Day Club was founded in 1896 by the actress, Bertha Welby.

It was composed largely of intelligent and well-known women who were not strong-minded, but who had at heart the best interests of women. It was at the time when women were becoming more and more involved in the business world. Before this, when comparatively few women had to venture out regardless of the weather, the prevalent styles didn't make much difference to women.

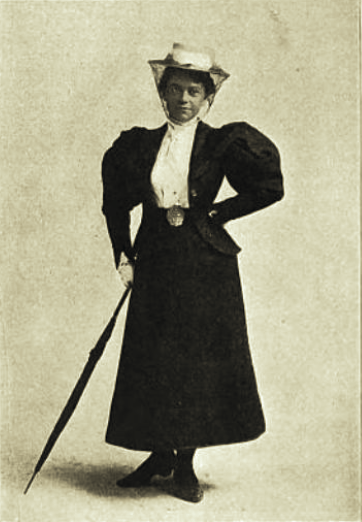
A rainy-day costume (The Illustrated American, 1897)

The object was to make fashionable, if possible, a sensible short-skirted costume for inclement weather. The members were impelled to this effort by the knowledge that the prevailing long trailing dresses carried into homes bacteria from dirty sidewalks. This was particularly true of the homes of poorer women, where often to dry their skirts, the wearers hung them up in the bedrooms. Experience taught them that the long skirt in rainy weather was a menace to health and that the dampness oftentimes became the generator of colds and, in many cases, of more serious complications. It was their aim to establish the rainy-day dress among women of all classes.

The movement was not a fad. It was not the club's intention to encourage women to dress inappropriately when outside. In fact, no unnecessarily conspicuous costume would be endorsed by the club. The members of the Rainy Day Club tried to make their stormy-day dresses as practical and at the same time as graceful as possible, but pledged themselves always to wear skirts that would not be more than 8 inches (200 mm) or less than 4 inches (100 mm) from the ground, and that their feet and ankles would be adequately protected against the damp and wet.

Besides the Committee on Hygiene, there were also committees on literature, music, and art. The annual meeting for the election of officers took place on the third Wednesday in December, while other business meetings of the club were held on the third Wednesday of all but the summer months. The social meetings occurred on the first Wednesdays, excepting also June, July, August, and September.

Newspapermen found the club women a laughable subject of the newspaper wit in vogue at the time. They dubbed them the Rainy Daisies, and the topical songsters of the stage made fun of them under that title. At times, they were ridiculed by other women. In the end, other women simply declined to back them up by following their excellent example. As a result, the Rainy Day Club quickly faded away and women went on dragging their skirts in the dirt and wet.

Twenty years later, the rainy daisy skirt came into fashion at the behest of the Parisian and U.S. fashion Markets.
