= Daisy Miller =

1878 novella by Henry James

- First authorised American edition
- Author: Henry James
- Language: English
- Genre: Novella
- Publisher: Harper & Brothers
- Publication date: 1879 (Note: Daisy Miller was pirated by two American magazines, Littell's Living Age and Home Journal, in July–August 1878.)
- Publication place: United Kingdom
- Media type: Print
- Pages: 43
- Dewey Decimal: 813.4
- LC Class: PS2116 .D3

Daisy Miller, A Study is a novella by Henry James that first appeared in The Cornhill Magazine in June–July 1878, and in book form the following year. It portrays the courtship of the beautiful American girl Daisy Miller by Winterbourne, a sophisticated compatriot of hers. His pursuit of her is hampered by her own flirtatiousness, which is frowned upon by the other expatriates when they meet in Switzerland and Italy.

== Plot summary ==
Annie "Daisy" Miller and Frederick Winterbourne first meet in Vevey, Switzerland, in a garden of the grand hotel, where Winterbourne is allegedly vacationing from his studies (an attachment to an older lady is rumoured). They are introduced by Randolph Miller, Daisy's nine-year-old brother. Randolph considers their hometown of Schenectady, New York, to be absolutely superior to all of Europe. However, Daisy is absolutely delighted with the continent, especially the high society she wishes to enter.

Winterbourne is at first confused by her attitude, and though greatly impressed by her beauty, he soon determines that she is nothing more than a young flirt. He continues his pursuit of Daisy in spite of the disapproval of his aunt, Mrs. Costello, who spurns any family with so close a relationship to their courier as the Millers have with their Eugenio. She also thinks Daisy is a shameless girl for agreeing to visit the Château de Chillon with Winterbourne after they have known each other for only half an hour. Two days later, the two travel to Château de Chillon, and although Winterbourne had paid the janitor for privacy, Daisy is not quite impressed. Winterbourne then informs Daisy that he must go to Geneva the next day. Daisy feels disappointment and chaffs him, eventually asking him to visit her in Rome later that year.

In Rome, Winterbourne and Daisy meet unexpectedly in the parlor of Mrs. Walker, an American expatriate, whose moral values have adapted to those of Italian society. Rumors about Daisy meeting with young Italian gentlemen make her socially exceptionable under these criteria. Winterbourne learns of Daisy's increasing intimacy with a young Italian of questionable society, Giovanelli, as well as the growing scandal caused by the pair's behaviour. Daisy is undeterred by the open disapproval of the other Americans in Rome, and her mother seems quite unaware of the underlying tensions. Winterbourne and Mrs. Walker attempt to persuade Daisy to separate from Giovanelli, but she refuses.

One night, Winterbourne takes a walk through the Colosseum and sees a young couple sitting at its centre. He realises that they are Giovanelli and Daisy. Infuriated with Giovanelli, Winterbourne asks him how he could dare to take Daisy to a place where she runs the risk of catching "Roman fever" (malaria). Daisy says she does not care and Winterbourne leaves them. Daisy falls ill and dies a few days later.

== List of characters ==
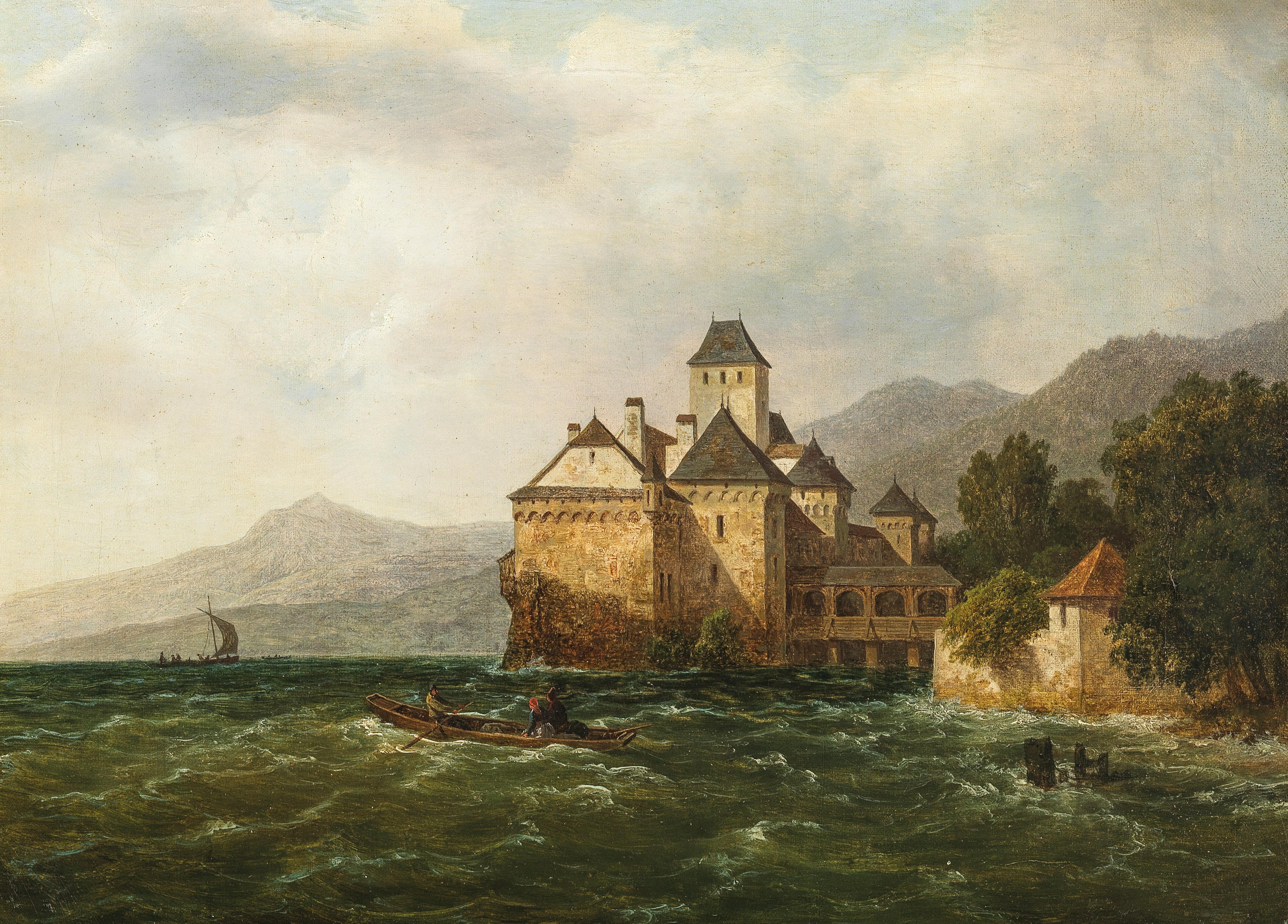
Frederick and Daisy visit the Château de Chillon (painted by August Piepenhagen)

- Annie P. Miller (Daisy) - A beautiful young American girl. Her age is not given, but she appears to be in her late teens.
- Frederick Winterbourne - 27-year-old American expatriate and gentleman raised in Europe. Lives in Geneva.
- Mrs Costello - Frederick's aunt, a reserved "widow with a fortune".
- Randolph C. Miller - Daisy's 9-year-old brother, responsible for introducing her to Frederick.
- Mrs Miller - Daisy and Randolph's mother.
- Eugenio - Miller's courier.
- Mrs Walker - An American lady living in Rome since long. Friend of Daisy and Frederick.
- Giovanelli - Daisy's intimate friend in Rome.
- Ezra B. Miller - The rich husband of Mrs Miller, father of Daisy and Randolph. Mentioned by the latter in the first chapter, he does not appear in the story.
- The 3 sons of Mrs Costello - In chapter 2, the omniscient narrator lets us know that Mrs Costello has 3 sons, two living in America, one in Germany. None of them appears in the story and remain unnamed.
- A friend in the street - In chapter 4, Frederick meets a friend at Via del Corso. This unnamed friend tells him that he had just seen Miss Daisy Miller with a companion at the Palazzo Doria, a famous museum nearby. In hearing this, Frederick heads immediately to see Mrs Miller, who apologies for receiving him in Daisy's absence.
- Dr Davis - Mrs Miller's physician in America (only mentioned).
- Mrs Sanders and Mrs Featherstone - Teachers, considered to support Randolph during the Millers' long term travel through Europe (only mentioned).

== Key themes ==
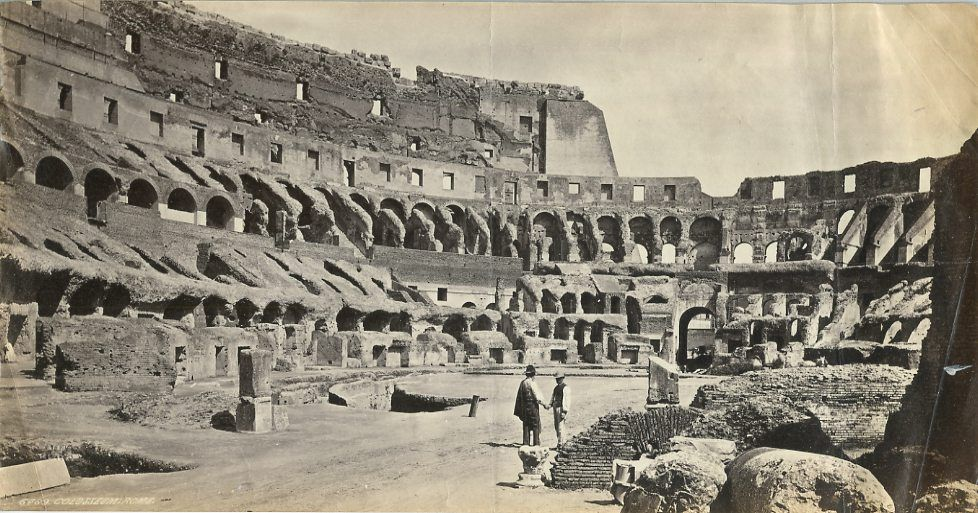
Interior of the Colosseum at the time Daisy Miller is set.

This novella serves as both a psychological description of the mind of a young woman and as an analysis of the traditional views of a society where she is a clear outsider. Henry James uses Daisy's story to discuss what he thinks Europeans and Americans believe about each other and more generally the prejudices common in any culture. In a letter, James said that Daisy is the victim of a "social rumpus" that goes on either over her head or beneath her notice.

The names of the characters are also symbolic. Daisy is a flower in full bloom, without inhibitions and in the springtime of her life. Daisy contrasts sharply with Winterbourne. Flowers die in winter and this is precisely what happens to Daisy after catching "Roman fever". As an objective analogue to this psychological reality, Daisy catches the very real Roman fever, the malaria that was endemic to many Roman neighbourhoods in the 19th century.

The issue on which the novella turns is the "innocence" of Daisy, despite her seemingly scandalous behavior.

John Burnside, writing for The Independent, said,

Daisy Miller arrives in Frederick Winterbourne's staid world the way that an angel arrives at an Annunciation, as both promise and challenge. From their first meeting at Vevey, to the story's dramatic conclusion in Rome, Winterbourne's interest in Daisy is subject to constant censure from his carefully "exclusive" aunt, Mrs Costello, and her forensically respectable social circle: the girl is "not nice", they say; she is overly familiar with her family's courier, she has been observed in inappropriate situations with dubious young "gentlemen" and Winterbourne would clearly do well to distance himself, before the inevitable scandal unfolds. At first sight, it seems that Winterbourne is genuinely torn between romantic attachment and his suffocating social milieu – and that might have made for an engaging, but not uncommon study of love versus convention; however, James' keen observation reveals something deeper than that, for even as he protests his aunt's attacks on Daisy's character (yes, she is uncultivated, he admits, but she is not the reprobate for which the entire world has decided to mistake her), he is less disappointed than relieved when a nocturnal encounter with the girl and her suitor, Giovanelli, appears to prove Mrs Costello right: "Winterbourne stopped, with a sort of horror; and, it must be added, with a sort of relief. It was as if a sudden illumination had been flashed upon the ambiguity of Daisy's behaviour and the riddle had become easy to read. She was a young lady whom a gentleman need no longer be at pains to respect." Though the novella's final act has yet to unfold, we cannot help but conclude that the real tragedy lies here, in Winterbourne's relief.

== Critical evaluation ==
Daisy Miller was an immediate and widespread popular success for James, despite some criticism that the story was "an outrage on American girlhood". The story continues to be one of James' most popular works, along with The Turn of the Screw and The Portrait of a Lady. Critics have generally praised the freshness and vigor of the storytelling.

In 1909, James revised Daisy Miller extensively for the New York Edition. He altered the tone of the story, and many modern editions (Penguin; Broadview) prefer to print the original edition, their editors believing that the later edition is a diminution of the original, rather than an improvement.

== Derivative works ==
James converted his story into a play that failed to be produced. He published the play in The Atlantic Monthly in 1883, and it showed many changes from the original story. In particular, a happy ending was inserted to please what James believed to be the preferences of theatre-goers.

In the 1890s, a short walking-skirt called the rainy daisy, supposedly named for Daisy Miller, was introduced.

A 1974 film adaptation was directed by Peter Bogdanovich, with Cybill Shepherd as Daisy, Barry Brown as Frederick Winterbourne, Cloris Leachman as Mrs. Ezra Miller, Duilio Del Prete as Mr. Giovanelli, and Eileen Brennan as Mrs. Walker. Frederic Raphael wrote the script; the film follows the structure of the original story without significant changes, and even uses portions of James' dialogue from the novella.

The novella was adapted in 2017 as a five-part radio drama on BBC Radio 4 for its 15 Minute Drama's "Love Henry James" series.

== See also ==
- Roman Fever by Edith Wharton
