= Maude Banks =

American stage actress (1857–1927)

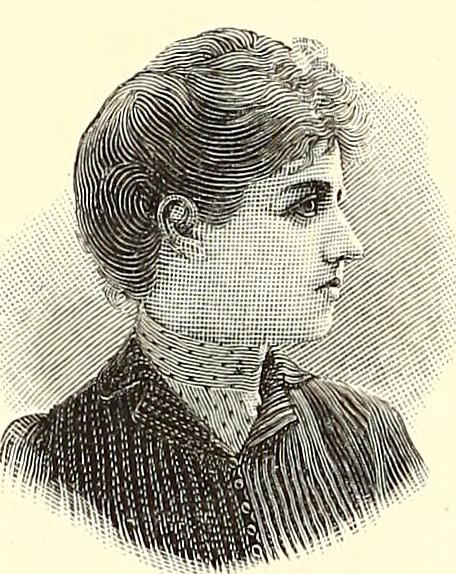
Miss Banks (December, 1891)

Maude Banks (1857–1927) was an American stage actress.

== Life ==
Maud Banks, the daughter of Nathaniel Prentiss Banks, was born in 1857. After a course of study and training at the New York school of acting, she went upon the stage in 1886, making her first appearance at Portsmouth, New Hampshire, in the character of Parthenia in Ingomar. She may also have written plays.

She died, unmarried, in 1927.

== Sources ==
- Wilson, J. G.; Fiske, J., eds. (1888). "Banks, Nathaniel Prentiss". Appletons' Cyclopædia of American Biography. Vol. 1. New York: D. Appleton & Co. p. 159.
- "Actresses in Real Tears; Final Rehearsal of "The City's Heart" Too Strenuous. It Resulted in the Postponement for One Week of the Professional Woman's League's Matinee". The New York Times. April 18, 1902. ISSN 0362-4331. Retrieved January 25, 2023.
- "Services Miss Maude Banks". Lewiston Evening Journal. December 21, 1927. p. 2.
