= Ida C. Nahm =

American medical doctor (1865–1922)

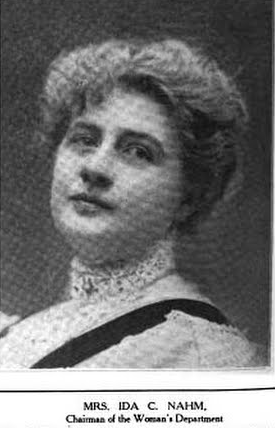
- Ida C. Nahm, from a 1910 publication.
- Born: November 1865; German Valley, New Jersey
- Died: November 1, 1922 (aged 56–57)
- Occupation: Doctor
- Known for: Professional Woman's League

Ida Catherine Mettler Nahm (November 1865 – November 1, 1922) was an American medical doctor and clubwoman.

== Early life and education ==
Ida C. Mettler was born in the German Valley, New Jersey section of Washington Township, Morris County, New Jersey, the daughter of Augustus Mettler and Christianna B. Bryant Mettler. She earned a medical degree at the Hering Medical College in Chicago in 1896.

== Career ==
Nahm sang in the chorus at the Metropolitan Opera and worked as a nurse, before attending medical school. In 1899, she and her husband were running a sanitarium in New York City. She gave health and beauty advice – about makeup, shoes, corsets, exercise, relationships, and skincare — in syndicated newspaper articles in the 1910s.

Nahm was Corresponding Secretary of the Professional Woman's League in 1904, and later became one of the league's vice presidents, supporting Amelia Bingham as president. She was also an executive of the Stage Children's Fund. In the 1910s, she was manager of the women's department of the annual Actors' Fund Fair, a major fundraising event.

== Personal life ==
Ida Catherine Mettler married theatrical manager Simon Nahm in 1892. She was widowed in 1909, and she died from diabetes in 1922, aged 56 years, at her home in New York City.
