= Henry O'Reilly =

American businessman

- Born: 6 February 1806; Carrickmacross, County Monaghan, Ireland
- Died: 17 August 1886 (aged 80)
- Occupation: Businessman
- Known for: Publishing, Telegraphy pioneering
- Spouse: Marcia Brooks
- Children: Bertha Welby

Henry O'Reilly (February 6, 1806 – August 17, 1886) was an Irish-American businessman and telegraphy pioneer.

== Early life ==
O'Reilly was born in Carrickmacross, County Monaghan, Ireland. He emigrated with his father to New York City in 1816, where he then changed the spelling of his surname to O'Rielly. With his friend Luther Tucker he went to Rochester, New York, and organized the Rochester Daily Advertiser. He was active in Jacksonian politics. The postmaster, Amos Kendall, appointed him to the Rochester post office. O'Reilly chose a young Scottish immigrant, James D. Reid, as his assistant. He married Marcia Brooks, daughter of Micah Brooks, in 1830.

== Civic accomplishments ==
O'Reilly was one of the Rochester citizens advocating the deepening and improvement of the Erie Canal. He could see that revenues from tolls were not sufficient for major improvements. They advocated borrowing at a time when many considered it immoral.

He promoted a change in the Rochester city charter in 1841 to support free public education. This was opposed by many who preferred education only for a privileged class. He was elected to the subsequent Board of Education. He promoted and became president of the Young Men's Association that created the first library open to the public in the city.

== Publishing ==
O'Reilly was one of the first authors to write a survey of Rochester and its immediate surroundings, first with a fourteen-page tract Rochester in 1835: Brief Sketches of the Present Condition of the City of Rochester. He followed that with a massive publication just three years later, describing in great detail, the Settlement in the West: Sketches of Rochester: with Incidental Notices of Western New-York ... (1838, 504 pp., published by William Alling), known colloquially as Sketches of Rochester.

== Telegraph entrepreneur ==
O'Reilly signed an ambiguous contract on June 13, 1845, with Amos Kendall, agent of Samuel Morse, for a telegraph line from the eastern seaboard to the Great Lakes. With others he formed the Atlantic, Lake & Mississippi Valley Telegraph system composed of six independent units including the Atlantic & Ohio Telegraph Company. Its superintendent was James D. Reid. The ambiguity of the contract and O'Reilly's aggressive interpretation led to conflict with Kendall and an acrimonious court action. The subsequent case, O'Reilly v. Morse, has been highly influential in the development of the law of patent-eligibility. When he lost this case, his telegraphy empire declined.
