= Emma Beckwith =

Suffragette, bookkeeper, optician, inventor

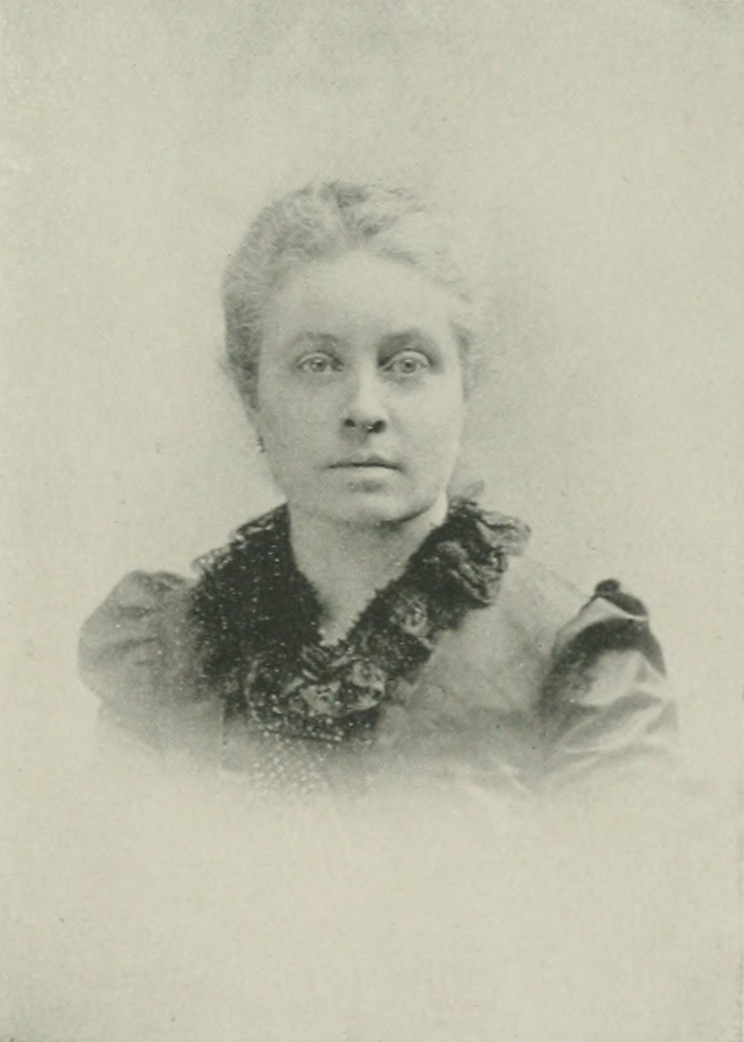
- Portrait in A Woman of the Century
- Born: Emma Knight; December 4, 1849; Cincinnati, Ohio
- Died: November 25, 1919 (aged 69)
- Occupations: Bookkeeper, Optician, Suffragist
- Spouse: Edwin Beckwith (m. 1868)

Emma Beckwith (December 4, 1849 – November 25, 1919) was an American suffragette, bookkeeper, optician, and inventor.

Beckwith held various jobs. She was the first woman in business in the Maiden Lane, Manhattan neighborhood in the spring of 1878. In the following year, she became a bookkeeper in Nassau Street, Manhattan. Beckwith also worked as a wholesale and retail optician; and she was the inventor of the Excelsior lens drill tor optical work. In 1886 or 1889, she was a candidate of the Equal Rights Party for mayor of Brooklyn.

== Early years and education ==
Emma Knight was born in Cincinnati, Ohio, December 4, 1849. Her parents were Michael and Laura M. (Sherman) Knight. Her father was born and reared near Baltimore, Maryland. Her mother was a direct descendant of the Sherman family.

Beckwith was educated under Freethought religions (Spiritualist and Unitarian) in Toledo, Ohio. She received a thorough common-school education, graduating at the age of seventeen years from the high school in Toledo, Ohio, where her parents had removed when she was four years old. Her ambition was to earn money enough to cultivate her musical ambitions. The only avenue open was a store clerkship, but the opposition of schoolmates and friends dissuaded her from making the attempt. At that time, it was not considered respectable for a young lady to stand behind a counter and measure off dry-goods and ribbons for women, and possibly men customers.

== Career ==
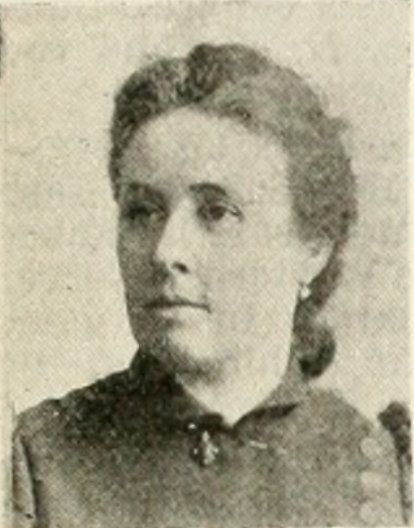
Emma Beckwith

On January 30, 1868, she married Edwin Beckwith, of Mentor, Ohio. After residing in Pleasantville, Iowa, a number of years, during which time she had ample opportunity to observe the necessity of more freedom for women, they removed to Brooklyn, New York. Upon locating in the East she began to put to practical use her knowledge of bookkeeping, after obtaining the permission of the owner of a building in Nassau Street, Manhattan, by promising to not demoralize the men employed in the several offices in the building. She began work in April, 1879. Feeling assured that other women would soon follow in her footsteps, she fully realized that by her acts they would be judged. She was the pioneer woman bookkeeper in that part of the city and established a reputation for modesty and uprightness that helped many other women to a like position. Her business education of five years' duration gave her an insight into many matters not general among women. After leaving business life, she turned her attention towards acquainting others with the knowledge thus gained and urging voting women to become self-supporting. She believed that by working in that direction, the question of marriage would eventually be settled.

About that time, she became acquainted with Belva Ann Lockwood and, having become disgusted with the vast amount of talk and so little practical work among the advocates of woman suffrage, felt that Lockwood had struck the key-note of the situation when she became a candidate for the presidency of the United States. When she realized Lockwood's earnestness of purpose, Beckwith's ambition was roused to the point of emulation; hence she became a candidate for mayor of Brooklyn, as the representative of the Equal Rights Party for that office. The result testified to the correctness of her belief. The campaign of ten days' duration with but two public meetings, resulted in her receiving fifty votes regularly counted, and many more thrown out among the scattering, before the New-York Tribune made a demand for her vote. Beckwith compiled many incidents relating to that novel campaign in a lecture on the subject. She believed that women should take an active part in the political as well as the religious and social field. Believing in individualism, she was an earnest advocate of the cause of the oppressed of all classes. She entered the regular lecture field and was an able and entertaining speaker.

== Affiliations ==
Beckwith was involved in several organizations. She was president of the Spiritualistic Society in Brooklyn for five years. Favoring woman suffrage, she held the office of secretary of the Woman Suffrage Society, in Toledo, Ohio. She was the seventh member of the Society for Political Study, and after more than two decades, became an honorary member. She was a member of Daughters of Ohio in New York and was the organization's fourth president. She was an active member of the Peace Circle with Clara Barton, Belva Lockwood, Alfred Love, and others. She was also the first president of the Rainy Day Club; a member of the National Arts Club and the Hundred Year Club; and vice-president of the Shakespeare League, a study club organized in endeavor to determine authorship as between Bacon and Shakespeare. Beckwith was a Free Thinker and a Republican.

== Personal life ==
Her children included Carmelita, born 1868; Arthur, born 1870; and Betsy, born 1875. Beckwith died November 25, 1919.
