= Mrs. A. M. Palmer =

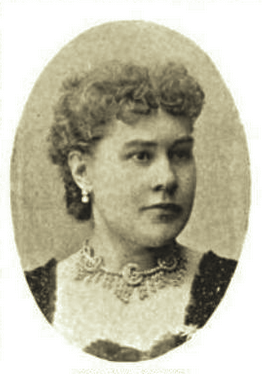
- Portrait in The History of the Woman's Club Movement, 1898
- Born: Laura Adelize Eliza Mowbray; July 4, 1848; Philadelphia, Pennsylvania, U.S.
- Died: March 14, 1923; Manhattan, New York, U.S.
- Other names: Laura Shook
- Occupations: clubwoman; civic leader
- Known for: Founder & president, Professional Woman's League of New York; President, Rainy Day Club
- Spouses: Sheridan Shook; Albert Marshman Palmer
- Children: 5

Mrs. A. M. Palmer (née, Laura Adelize Mowbray; after first marriage, Shook; after second marriage, Palmer; 1848–1923) was an American clubwoman and civic leader. She was the founder and first president of the Professional Woman's League of New York. For 25 years, she served as president of the Rainy Day Club.

== Biography ==
Laura Adelize ("Ada") Eliza Mowbray was born in Philadelphia, Pennsylvania, July 4, 1848.

She was involved with organizations to rectify short weights and false measurements. According to authorized statements, it was said that New York City lost US$1,000,000 yearly on shortweighted package goods. All devices for fraud resorted to by merchants and dealers were to be brought to account. She had been joined in this work by Mrs. William Grant Brown, of New York.

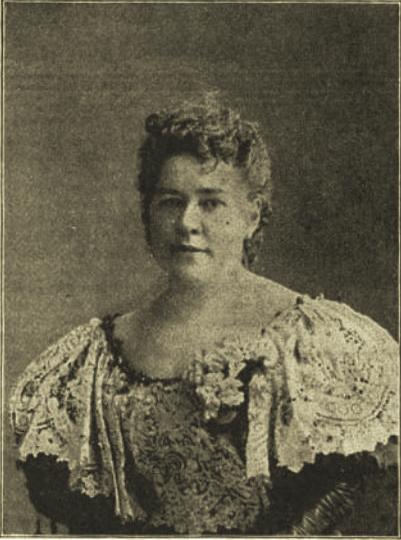
Mrs. A. M. Palmer (The Delineator, 1899)

Palmer was the founder and president of the Professional Woman's League of New York City. For 25 years, she served as president of the Rainy Day Club, which campaigned for short skirts for rainy days, but eventually, the movement grew until it had become largely responsible for the shorter clothing that U.S. women wore by the time of her death.

Her executive ability was proved in her work on various committees in Sorosis and the Woman's Press Club of New York City. Palmer also chaired the committee on enrollment when the New York State Federation of Woman's Clubs was being formed. She was a member of many other clubs, among them Sorosis, Woman's Press Club of New York City, Little Mothers' Aid Association, New England Women, American Defense Society, Woman's Forum, Rescue Home of the Salvation Army, New York Theater Club, American Playgoers, Col. Cliff Dwellings, New Yorkers, Women's Health Protective, Women's Peace Circle, Woman's Republican, School for Crippled Children, Twelfth Night, Equal Suffrage, and William Lloyd Garrison Equal Rights.

About 1866, she married Sheridan Shook (1828-1899). They had two children, Louise (b. 1867) and Lydia (b. 1870), and later divorced. Secondly, on January 1, 1884, in Stamford, Connecticut, she married Albert Marshman Palmer (1838-1905), the theatrical manager. They had three children: Morton (b. 1875), Albert (b. 1876), and Phyllis (b. 1890).

Laura Adelize Mowbray Palmer died at her home at 3100 Broadway, New York City, on March 14, 1923.
