= Rainy daisy =

Style of skirt

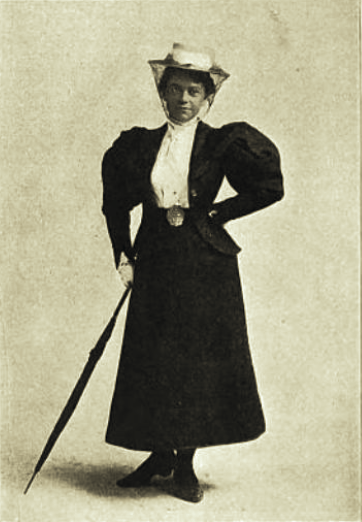
A rainy-day costume (The Illustrated American, 1897)

A rainy daisy is a style of walking skirt worn during the "Gay Nineties" (1890–1900). The skirts were trimmed to be 2–3 inches off the ground and were worn by members of the Rainy Day Club. They were so-called because their shorter length meant that, by not trailing and soaking up water, they were easier to keep dry in wet weather. An alternative source for the name suggests that they were called after Daisy Miller, the eponymous heroine of the 1878 novella by Henry James.

At their shortest, the skirts could measure six inches off the ground, which was seen as a bold statement of independence on the part of its wearers. Rainy daisy skirts influenced the development in fashion of shorter and slimmer skirts from 1908 onwards. Sometimes the skirts were called "golf skirts" or "walking skirts" as they were practical for sporting pursuits and walking through crowds in urban environments.
