= Isabelle Evesson =

American actress (c. 1870–1914)

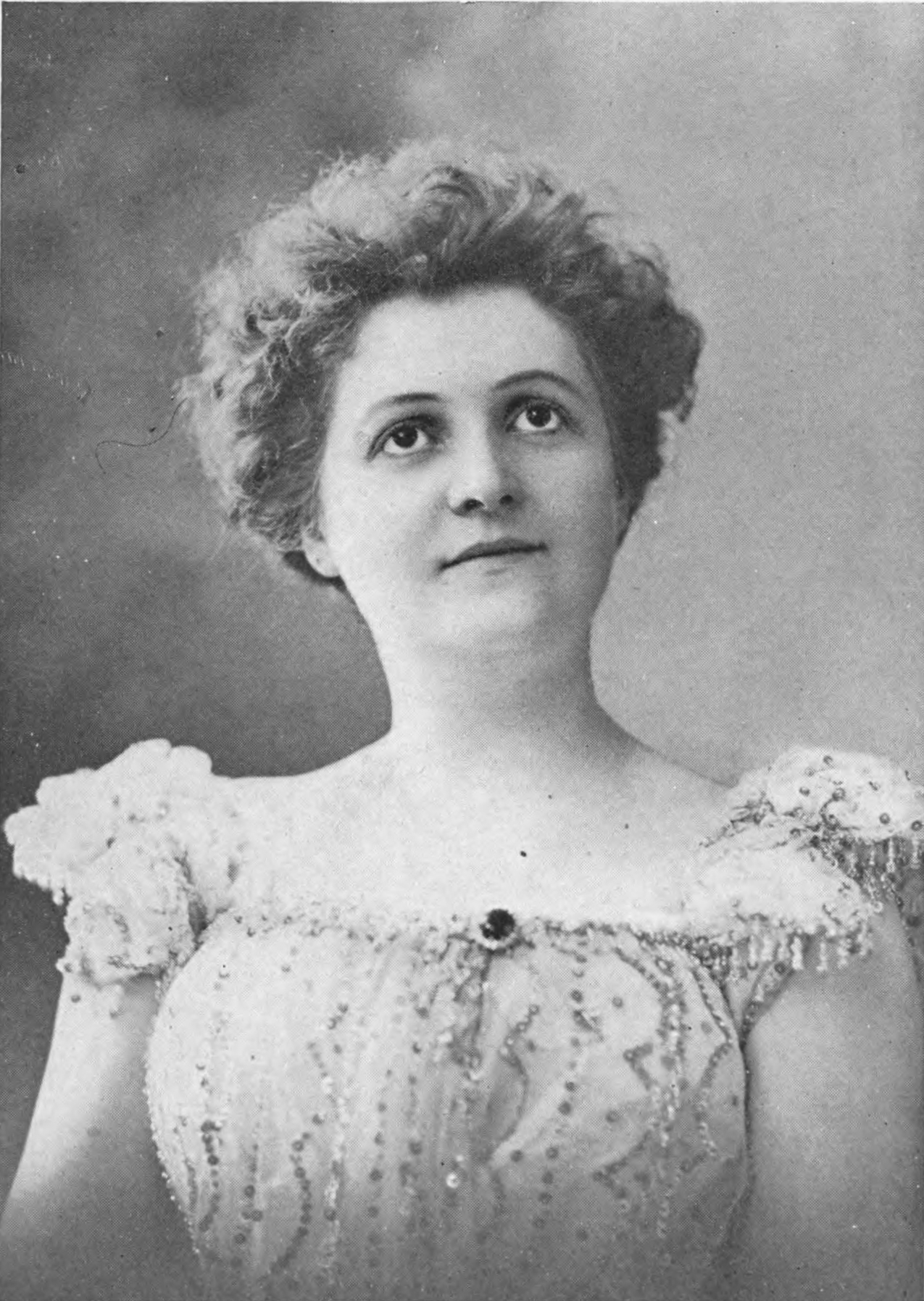
- Isabelle Evesson, from a 1901 publication
- Born: c. 1870; New York, New York, United States
- Died: August 9, 1914; Stamford, Connecticut, United States
- Occupation: Actor

Isabelle Evesson (c. 1870 – August 9, 1914) was an American actress.

== Early life ==
Isabelle Evesson was born in New York City, the daughter of Henry Evesson Jr. and Florine Augusta Bassford Evesson.

Her sister Estelle Clayton was also an actress, as well as a playwright; she wrote A Puritan Romance as a vehicle for her sister and herself. In 1907, the sisters formed the Bassford Estate Corporation, hoping to recover compensation for some of their grandfather's extensive land holdings in the New York City area. "So, with the walls of their handsome apartment covered with old maps," explained a newspaper reporter in 1907, "these two Evesson sisters, year in and year out, are making their fight for untold millions."

== Career ==
Isabelle Evesson was performing on stage from her teens, often in touring companies and in Boston and Chicago. She spent two years acting in London. "Every act and gesture is finished," noted a Los Angeles newspaper of Evesson's performance in 1905, "and her voice is sweet and well modulated." Evesson's Broadway credits included roles in Mr. Barnes of New York (1888), Papa's Wife (1899–1900), Anna Karenina (1905), and The Charm of Isabel (1914). She was in the original 1887 cast of Richard Mansfield's Dr. Jekyll and Mr. Hyde at the Boston Museum.

Evesson appeared in two silent films, A Mother's Atonement (1914), and The Girl and the Bachelor (1915). She was a charter member of the Professional Woman's League at their organizational meeting in 1892.

== Personal life ==
Isabelle Evesson married journalist Almyr Wilder Cooper in 1895; the Mayor of New York performed the civil ceremony in his office. Cooper died suddenly in 1896, from injuries sustained in an assault. Isabel Evesson died in 1914, at home in Stamford, Connecticut, in her forties.
