= Professional Woman's League of New York =

Professional Woman's League
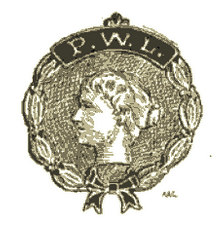
- Abbreviation: P.W.L.
- Formation: December 6, 1892
- Founder: Mrs. A. M. Palmer
- Headquarters: 1509 Broadway, New York City, New York, U.S.
- Services: social; educational; philanthropic
- Methods: meetings; classes
- Fields: primarily, actors

Professional Woman's League (acronym, P.W.L.) was an American charitable organization in New York City, founded by Mrs. A. M. Palmer, It was organized December 6, 1892, and incorporated February 28, 1893. By 1904, it numbered more than 500 women engaged in public pursuits, among them many of the representative actresses of England and the U.S.

The aims of the league were to bring together women engaged in dramatic, musical, literary, artistic, and scientific pursuits for mutual help and encouragement, to offer pecuniary assistance when in need, to provide class instruction in literature, art, language, music, and other studies at lowest possible rates, and to assist members to obtain outfits necessary to securing employment. Active membership in the League was confined to women engaged in dramatic, musical, or literary pursuits. The dues for active and associate members alike were US$7.50 a year, and in addition, each member, upon being admitted to membership, pledged herself to contribute two articles yearly which could either be sold in the bazar or utilized in the costume department.

== Establishment ==
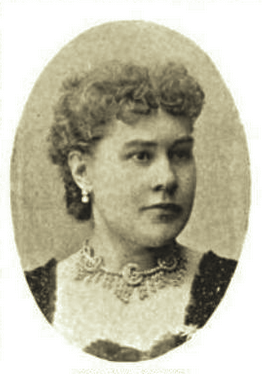
Mrs. A. M. Palmer (The History of the Woman's Club Movement, 1898)

The Professional Woman's League was the outcome of the work done by the Woman's executive committee in aid of the Actors' Fund Fair held at the Madison Square Garden in 1892. In fact, it was conceded by all that the fair would never have been the financial success that it undoubtedly was but for the efforts of the women. There were some 300 on this committee, representing the actress, the musician, the literary woman, the doctor, and other professions and various views. At the conclusion of the fair, it was the general impression that the good fellowship and sympathy of these women workers might accomplish great and beneficial results if they could be banded together permanently. To reach the opinions of her associates, Mrs. A. M. Palmer sent letters to many of the committee, and in answer to these, some 21 women attended an informal gathering held at her house. The idea of an organization was favored and it was decided to hold a regular meeting at 29 West Thirtieth Street, Manhattan. Here, on December 6, 1892, this band of 21 women formulated a club that after 23 months, number more than 500 members.

At the first meeting, many titles were suggested for the club, but Palmer's proposal, that it be called the Professional Woman's League, was approved and Palmer was unanimously chosen as president. Agnes Ethel Roudebush was selected as vice-president and May Tyrell Eberle as secretary. For its headquarters, Palmer placed at the organization's disposal the use of the two floors of 29 West Thirtieth Street. Here, for 17 months, the League found a comfortable and congenial home, rent, gas and heat-free. Mrs. Sydney Rosenfeld was selected as chairman on by-laws, and owing to her able work and good judgment this task was soon completed. On February 28, 1893, the Professional Woman's League was incorporated by the State of New York.

== History ==
The Professional Woman's League of New York City was founded by Palmer in December 1892. It possessed some original and distinctive features. Palmer, through her husband's connection with the dramatic profession, came to know the needs of the struggling young actresses, and she felt that a club for such girls, where they could meet not only the women of their own kind but those of other professions as well, would be helpful to all. She secured temporary headquarters, and the club started with 150 members.

Though affiliated with both State and General Federations of Women's Clubs, the P.W.L. differed from the Woman's Club in its educational, industrial, artistic, and philanthropic union, with club features. The P.W.L.'s charitable work was on a practical sensible basis of helping women who are willing and striving to help themselves. Women of all professions were enrolled in the membership. They proved that social and intellectual intercourse broadened their views and enhanced respect for the diversified occupations represented in the P.W.L. The actress, the doctor, the musician, the painter, the writer, and the lawyer mingled and took part in all affairs of the League and found it to their mutual advantage to do so.

The insignia was a medallion with woman's head in relief, surrounded by a silver wreath tied with dark blue ribbon; above the head P. W. L. on dark blue ground.

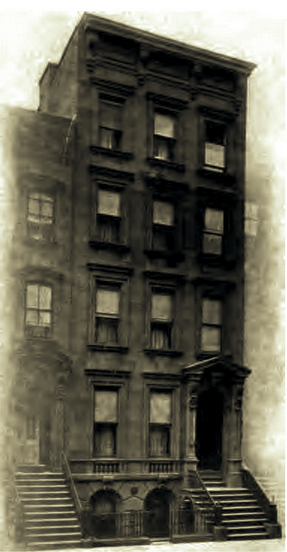
Professional Woman's League building (New York City, 1904)

It maintained an entire house for the League work at 1509 Broadway, the only woman's club in New York at the time that occupied its own house except for the Club of Trained Nurses.

== Membership ==
Subsequently, the membership grew to nearly 500. Membership was not limited to residents of New York City. Young actresses who spend most of the year "on the road" recognized that it was profitable and pleasant to have a membership in it, and, while in New York City, found it in a sense a home, while there were a number of professional women in Boston and other cities whose names appeared on the membership rolls. The League was financially prosperous, the membership constantly increasing. There was a desire to purchase a clubhouse as the one they were using was hired from year to year and was too small for the club's requirements, needing as they did larger rooms for their educational departments.

== Operations ==
Its meetings were held on Monday afternoons during the entire year. The first Monday of each month was devoted to literature; the second to the transaction of business; the third to the drama; and the fourth to a social reception, at which some distinguished guests entertained. There were classes at different times in sewing, dressmaking, fencing, dancing, gymnastics, painting, languages, music, voice culture, and china painting. Classes were open to members at nominal rates, and were organized in such branches of study as seemed most needed, and soon afterward, the house at 1509 Broadway was hired and furnished. Some of these were always in operation. Some were elementary, and others more advanced.

There was a philanthropic side to the club, also, through which many young women who were temporarily distressed were helped and kept from despair.

One of its practical methods of obtaining funds was an annual bazaar in which each member was bound to contribute two salable articles. This was held during, or just previous to the Christmas holidays, and brings a large sum to the League fund. Some of its contributions were by leading actresses, whose names alone gave financial value to whatever they stood for. Its anniversaries were distinguished by the originality and attractive character of the exercises; the president's address, and dramatic sketches, or brief papers by well-known representatives of the dramatic profession being leading features.

The League produced Shakespearean and other plays, every part being sustained by a League member.

== Notable people ==
In 1898, the officers of the Professional Woman's League were: President, Mrs. Laura A. Palmer; corresponding secretary, Miss Sara Palmer; treasurer, Mrs. Edwin Knowles; chairman of Executive Committee, Mrs. Rachel McCauley; chairman of Dramatic Committee, Mrs. E. L. Fernandez.

Other notable people included:

- Isabelle Evesson, charter member, PWL
- Ida C. Nahm, Corresponding Secretary, PWL
- Mary Jane Spurlin, judge; member PWL

=== Executive Committee ===
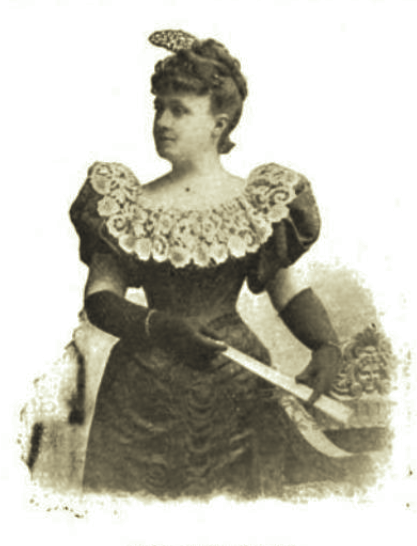
Ada Crisp

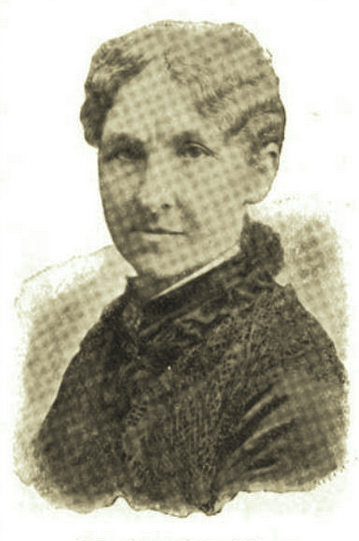
Dr. Cordelia Williams

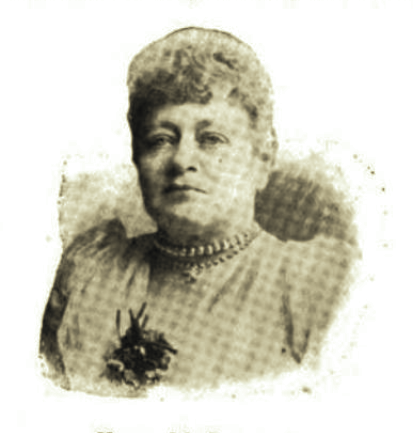
Kate M. Bostwick

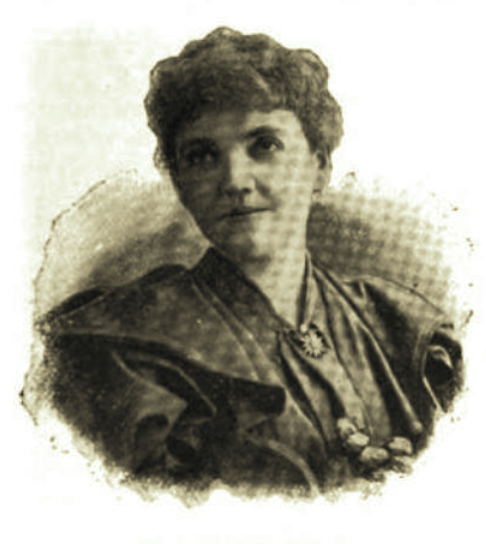
Mary Shaw

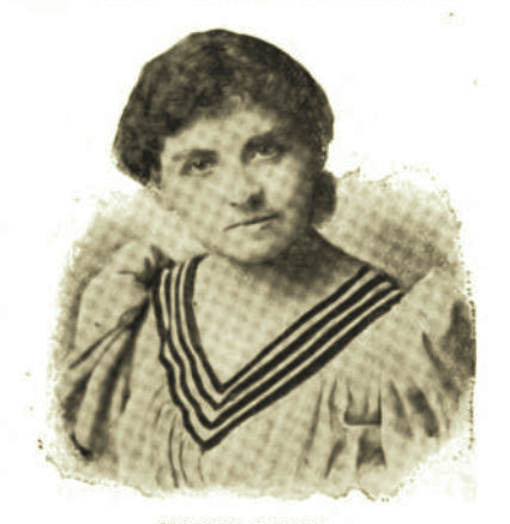
Maude Banks

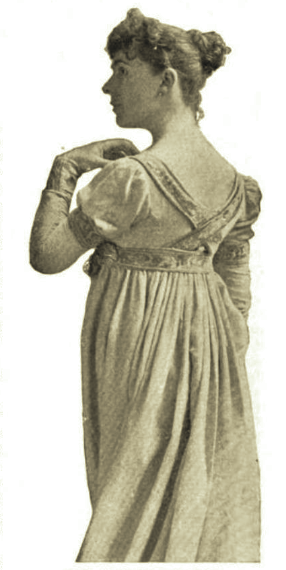
Mrs. Robert Mantell

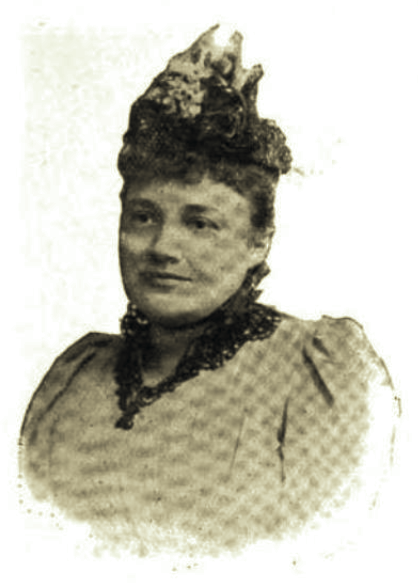
Mrs. Sydney Rosenfeld

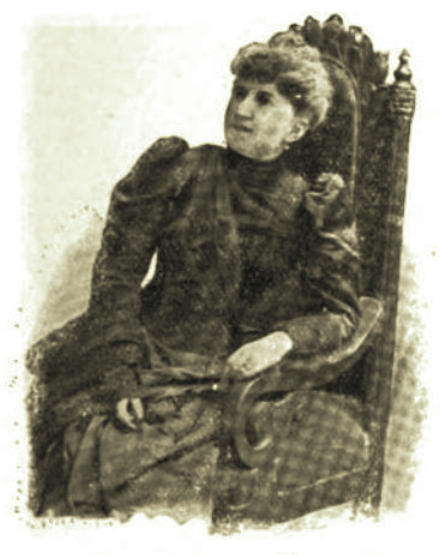
Rachel M'Auley
