= Impeachment investigation =

Governmental investigation

An impeachment investigation (also known as an "impeachment inquiry") is an investigation or inquiry which takes place in relation to an impeachment or potential impeachment.

In some governments, such as Ireland, Singapore, and Turkey, impeachment investigations take place after an impeachment vote. In other governments, impeachment investigations precede a potential impeachment vote. In Hong Kong, a formal impeachment investigation is required before the Legislative Council can hold a vote on whether to impeach the chief executive of Hong Kong. In the United States, where impeachment-related investigations are commonly called "impeachment inquiries", they are not a required part of the impeachment process. However, when impeachment-related investigations are conducted in the United States, they usually precede a potential impeachment vote, with the investigations resulting in a recommendation as to whether an impeachment should take place.

== Hong Kong ==
In the process by which the Legislative Council can impeach the chief executive of Hong Kong, a motion for investigation charging the Chief Executive with "serious breach of law or dereliction of duty" and refusing to resign must first be initiated jointly by at least one-fourth of all the legislators, and then passed by the council. After this, an independent investigation committee, chaired by the chief justice of the Court of Final Appeal, will then carry out the investigation and report back to the council. If the Council find the evidence sufficient to substantiate the charges, it may then pass a motion of impeachment by a two-thirds majority.

== Ireland ==
In the Republic of Ireland, formal impeachment applies only to the Irish president. Either house of the Oireachtas (parliament) may impeach the president for the commission of "stated misbehaviour". If one does, the other house is either to investigate the charge or commission another body or committee to do so. The investigating house can remove the president if it decides, by a vote of least a two-thirds majority of its members finding both that the president is guilty of the charge and that the charge is sufficiently serious as to warrant the president's removal. This process has never been used.

== Singapore ==
Singapore's constitution enables the impeachment of a sitting president on charges of treason, violation of the Constitution, corruption, or attempting to mislead the Presidential Elections Committee for the purpose of demonstrating eligibility to be elected as president. The prime minister or at least one-quarter of all members of Parliament (MPs) can pass an impeachment motion, which requires the votes of at least half of all MPs (excluding nominated members) in order to pass. If an impeachment is passed, the chief justice of the Supreme Court will appoint a tribunal to investigate allegations against the president. If this tribunal finds the president guilty, or otherwise declares that the president is "permanently incapable of discharging the functions of his office by reason of mental or physical infirmity", Parliament would hold a vote on a resolution to remove the president from office, which would require a three-quarters majority to succeed. No president has ever been removed from office in this fashion.

== Turkey ==
In Turkey, according to the Constitution, the Grand National Assembly may start an investigation of the president, the vice president or any member of the Cabinet upon the proposal of simple majority of its total members, and within a period less than a month, the approval of three-fifths of the total members. Such an investigation is to be carried out by a commission of fifteen members of the Assembly, each nominated by the political parties in proportion to their representation therein. The commission is to submit its report indicating the outcome of the investigation to the speaker within two months. If the investigation is not completed within this period, the commission's time may be renewed for another month. Within ten days of its submission to the speaker, the report would be distributed to all members of the Assembly, and ten days after its distribution, the report would be discussed on the floor. Upon the approval of two thirds of the total number of the Assembly by secret vote, the person or persons, about whom the investigation was conducted, may be tried before the Constitutional Court. The trial would be finalized within three months, and if not, a one-time additional period of three months shall be granted. Any president about whom an investigation has been initiated is not permitted to call for an election. Any president, who is convicted by the Court is removed from office.

== Ukraine ==
The process for impeaching a president of Ukraine involves an impeachment investigation as its first step after a majority of the Verkhovna Rada votes to launch impeachment proceedings.

== United States ==
In the United States, impeachment investigations are commonly referred to as "impeachment inquiries". In the United States, impeachment inquiries occur before a potential impeachment vote.

=== Federal ===
An impeachment inquiry is not a required step in United States federal impeachment, as the Constitution of the United States does not require the United States House of Representatives (which it empowers to impeach many federal officeholders) to exercise its powers of impeachment in any specific manner. Nevertheless, impeachment inquiries have been utilized as a step in many prominent federal impeachment efforts.

=== State ===
Some states have also seen impeachment inquiries held into state officials.
