= Adelia E. Carman =

American educator, and temperance activist (1847 – 1923)

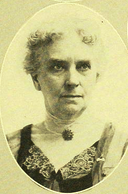
- Portrait photo from Women torch-bearers, 1924
- Born: Adelia Eliza Spalsbury; March 21, 1847; New York, U.S.
- Died: March 21, 1923; Chicago, Illinois, U.S.
- Occupation: Educator
- Known for: Superintendent, National and World's WCTU Medal Contest Work department

Adelia E. Carman (née, Spalsbury; 1847 – 1923) was an American educator. Serving as Superintendent of Medal Contest Work for the National Woman's Christian Temperance Union (WCTU), for 30 years, she directed the WCTU's state superintendents of Public Instruction in supporting instruction and contests in oratory or declamation in the areas of temperance, prohibition, narcotics, women's suffrage, purity, Christian citizenship, and many other topics. She also served as the World's WCTU superintendent of the department of Medal Contests.

== Early life and education ==
Adelia Eliza Spalsbury was born in Jefferson County, New York, or Russell, St. Lawrence County, New York, March 21, 1847. James Spalsbury (1810–1872) and his wife, Martha (née Whitman) (1813–1899). Adelia's siblings were: Sarah, Martha, Delevan, Daniel, Martin, James, William, and Alice.

She was educated in the schools of her own county.

== Career ==
She began teaching at an early age. After teaching eight years, the family moved to Wisconsin. Here she married Francis J. Carman (1845–1918) on October 3, 1847, and went with her husband to Missouri. She has two children, Clarence and Martha Maude.

Carman's first work with the WCTU was in Missouri in the Demorest Medal Contests work. So enthusiastic was she in this novel way of educating the children and young people, and so effectually converting their elders to improving the home environment, that she wished the same plans might be broadened and thus made more effective.

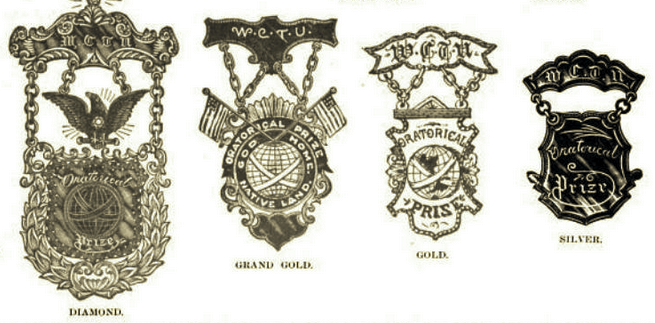
WCTU series of medals

The Demorest recitation only touched on temperance and prohibition, and Carman, knowing well the many-sided work of the WCTU, felt that this same education should be given on the use of narcotics, franchise for women, purity, Christian citizenship, and many other topics. This contest work was adopted in 1896 at St. Louis by the National WCTU at Carman's suggestion, and she was placed at the head of the National department. She was also made State Superintendent for Illinois. She had the hearty co-operation of William and Ellen Demorest. As soon as possible, the Demorest Contest Work was combined with the WCTU contests and all put under Carman's direction.

The work developed well, and far outstripped the vision seen by Carman, its founder. Medals were sent to nearly all foreign countries, and the number of kinds of medals in demand seemed unending. She had, beside the regular series of silver, gold, grand gold and diamond medals, an anti-narcotic medal, musical, matrons silver-gray, suffrage and L.T.L.. Those finishing the regular series, finally receiving the diamond medal, were diplomas from the WCTU school of oratory.

In managing all the details of this complicated work, with its designing of medals, editing and publishing the several contest books, planning the rules and suggestions and carrying on the large correspondence necessary, the National Superintendent proved herself to be an excellent businesswoman.

== Death ==
Carman made her home in Chicago, where she died March 21, 1923.
