= Mary Foot Seymour =

American journalist

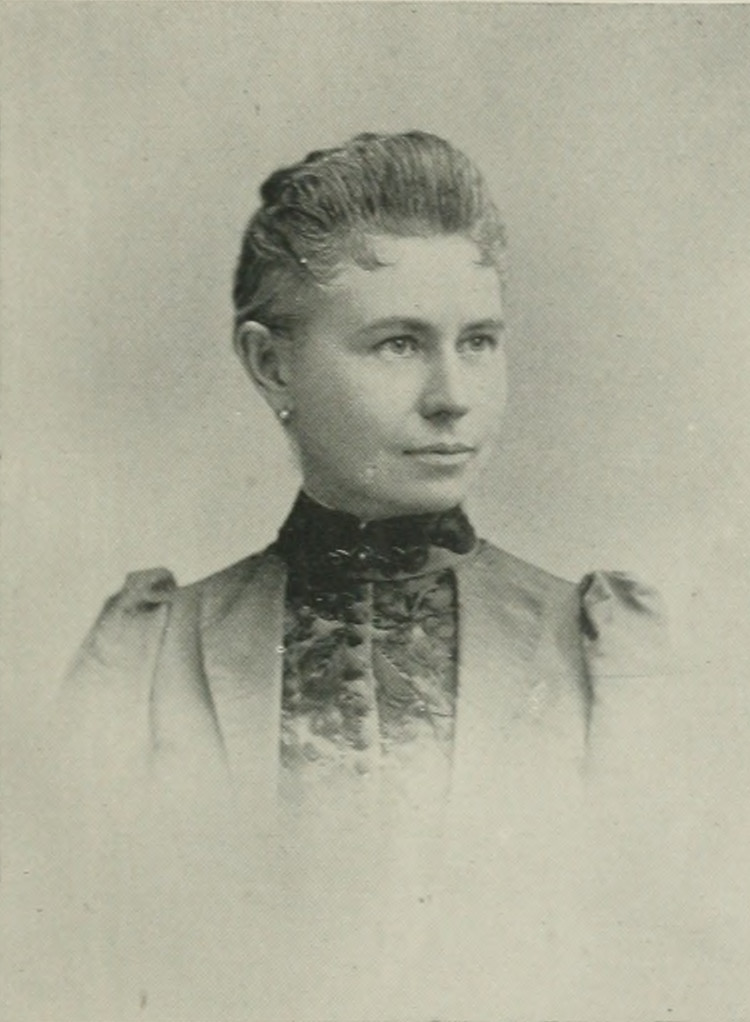
- Photo in A Woman of the Century
- Born: 1846; Aurora, Illinois, U.S.
- Died: March 21, 1893 (aged 46–47); New York City, New York, U.S.
- Occupations: businesswoman, journalist, school founder, magazine publisher
- Writing career
- Language: English
- Genre: juvenile literature

Mary Foot Seymour (1846 – March 21, 1893) was a 19th-century American businesswoman and journalist. In 1879, in New York City, she started the Union School of Stenography, the first women's secretarial school in the United States. She also published a magazine devoted to the interest of women. Seymour served as president of the Union Stenographic and Typewriting Association, commissioner of the United States Court of Claims, commissioner of deeds of New Jersey, and notary public of New York County, New York. She served three different terms in as many offices, and handled a large proportion of the writing done for the United States Patent and Trademark Office. Though she preferred journalistic work, she carried on her stenographic establishment as it paid better than correspondence or reporting. She was a member of the Woman's Press Club of New York City and Sorosis.

== Early life and education ==
Mary Foot Seymour was born in Aurora, Illinois, in 1846. Her parents were Ephraim Sanford Seymour and Rosette (Bestor) Seymour. Her father was an author, a scientific geologist, a lawyer, and a linguist, in Galena, Illinois. Her mother was a broad-minded, philanthropic woman, possessing great executive ability. Her father, acting as counselor for a large company, journeyed to California around this time. While crossing the Isthmus of Panama, he came down with yellow fever and died, at which time the family returned to the East coast.

Mary, the oldest daughter, inherited traits of both parents. She was a born scribbler and began to write poems and stories when she was eight years old. When she was eleven, a drama she had written was acted by the children in the village school. While studying in a boarding school, at about thirteen years of age, she wrote and published a good deal of creditable verse that earned her the title of "village poet". The first money Seymour ever earned in this way was for a rhyme sent to Jane Cunningham Croly for a child's magazine that Croly was editing at the time.

== Career ==
Seymour secured a teaching position in New York City, where she taught until it affected her health, and she was forced to resign. For a long time, she was confined to her bed in New England, where she was sent for a change of climate. Surrounded by books, she busied herself in writing. She wrote stories for children, a series of "talks" which appeared under the head of "Table Talk of Grandmother Greyleigh", and other more substantial work. The editor of one of the periodicals to which she had been contributing offered her a regular position on the staff of a new paper he was starting, which later became well known. She always used a pen name. After her health improved, she accepted a position in a New Jersey school, but was forced to give up work soon thereafter.

During her enforced confinement, she took up the study of stenography. Upon recovery, Seymour returned to New York City, and was soon earning a large salary. She reported sermons and lectures for practice; but so retentive was her memory that it is said Seymour could take down a speech verbatim, writing from her recollection of what was said. She felt that women should be permitted to work at any position for which they had the ability, and she decided to do anything in her power to help them. Opening an office for typewriting, she engaged two competent young women who understood the use of the machine. As the business increased, there was work for more women, but no women who understood the work.

Seymour decided to form a school. At first, tuition was free, but as the expenses and pupils increased she conceived the idea of making it a lucrative business, and was among the pioneers in opening a thoroughly equipped school, where the scholars were not only instructed in short-hand and typewriting, but received at the same time good business training. In 1879 regular school was opened, which flourished under the name of the Union School of Stenography. The office work increased until six separate offices were running successfully.

Seymour preferred working as a journalist, and, as her other enterprises gained momentum, she started publishing a magazine devoted to the interest of women, The Business Woman's Journal. After the first year, a publishing company, composed entirely of women, was formed with the name of The Mary F. Seymour Publishing Company, Seymour acting as editor of the magazine and as president of the company. The Journal was something new in the line of periodicals and was warmly received. In October 1892, the magazine was enlarged and appeared under the name of the American Woman's Journal and The Business Woman's Journal. In the spirit of self-help, and to prove the ability of women to manage large enterprises, all the stock of the company was kept in the hands of women. When Seymour was appointed Commissioner of Deeds for New Jersey, an appeal to the legislature was necessary to repeal the law to make it possible for a woman to be appointed to such an office. She also served as a commissioner for the United States for the Court of Claims and a notary public of New York County, New York. She was interested in woman suffrage, and gave considerable attention to all branches of reform. She was elected vice-president-at-large of the American Society of Authors.

== Death ==
She died March 21, 1893, in New York City.
