= J.J. Little & Ives Company =

Defunct American printer and publisher

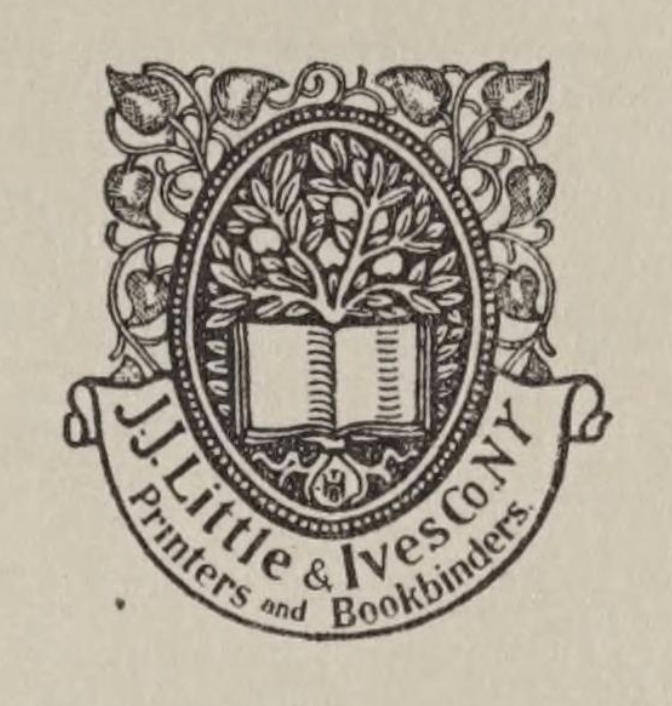
- Company type: Private
- Industry: Printing, Publishing
- Founded: 1867; 159 years ago
- Founder: Joseph J. Little
- Defunct: c. 1965
- Fate: Acquired
- Headquarters: New York City, United States

J.J. Little & Ives Company was a printer and publishing house in New York City that operated under various names from 1867 to at least the early 1960s.

== History ==
It was founded as Little, Rennie & Company in New York City by Joseph J. Little (1841–1913), who had immigrated with his family from England in 1846, apprenticed as a printer, and served in the Union Army from 1862 to 1864 as corporal, first sergeant, and first lieutenant. In 1867, Little formed a partnership with a Mr. Rennie, and together they offered typesetting services and made stereotype plates at Broome and Crosby Streets in the Lower Manhattan neighborhood now known as SoHo. Two years later, the company moved to a larger building four blocks uptown at 645-647 Broadway, and two years after that, moved to an even larger space at 108-114 Wooster Street, where it added a pressroom and pamphlet bindery.

Rennie died in 1876, whereupon the firm was dissolved. It was succeeded by Lange, Little & Co., which hired Orlando B. Potter to build an 8-story building for the business at 2-20 Astor Place. This was the largest space yet, and enabled the addition of a "complete cloth and leather bindery".

In 1878, Lange, Little & Co. was dissolved. Joseph Little formed the firm of J. J. Little & Co. with a new partner: William Jennings Demorest, fashion retailer and publisher of Demorest’s Illustrated Monthly.

In 1885, J. J. Little & Co. became involved in "one of the most spectacular ventures in publishing history" by printing the first 150,000 copies of the Personal Memoirs of U. S. Grant, the autobiography of former president Ulysses S. Grant.

From 1891 to 1893, Little served as a U.S. Representative from New York. The firm incorporated in 1894.

In 1908, the company changed its name to J. J. Little & Ives Company, having acquired the Edwin Ives & Sons Bookbindery. And after three decades on Astor Place, the company commissioned the 12-story Joseph J. Little Building at 425-435 East 24th Street. The company filled eight of the floors, occupying a total of 112,000 square feet.

After Little died in 1913, the Little Estate Corporation purchased the stock and bond holdings of the Ives and other interests, taking full ownership for the family of Mr. Little and the company's officers and directors.

In the early 20th century, the company printed many books for other publishing houses. Among them was The Eclipse of American Sea Power (1922) by Captain Dudley W. Knox, the naval correspondent of the The American Army & Navy Journal and ultimately one of the most influential historians to wear a U.S. Navy uniform. In 1923, the company reported that at its East 24th Street plant, "The Composing Rooms have an average daily output of 2,800,000 ems, covering all classes of work; the Electrotype Foundry turns out 1000 plates a day; the Pressrooms produce 1,000,000 pages daily and the Bindery has a daily capacity of 25,000 bound volumes".

In 1957, J.J. Little & Ives was purchased by Harold Drimmer of Golden Press, who appointed himself president.
