= Woman's Press Club of New York City =

American professional association for women journalists and authors

- Formation: November 19, 1889
- Purpose: to gain advantages for women arising from unity, fellowship, and co-operation with those engaged in similar pursuits
- Headquarters: 126 East 23rd Street, New York City, New York, US
- Official language: English
- President: Jane Cunningham Croly
- Vice-president: Sara Jane Lippincott

The Woman's Press Club of New York City (WPCNYC) was an American professional association for women journalists and authors. Located at 126 East 23rd Street, in Manhattan, the organization was founded by Jane Cunningham Croly in Manhattan in November 1889, incorporated in 1919, and dissolved on 8 March 1980.

== History ==
The Woman's Press Club of New York City was founded by Croly on November 19, 1889, in New York City, with 40 women from the city's papers. The mission of the club, according to its constitution, was to gain advantages for women arising from unity, fellowship, and co-operation with those engaged in similar pursuits. To be mutually helpful is the requirement among its members. The organization focused on civic projects, journalism scholarships, lectures, literary activities, and social activities for its membership.

The Women's Press Club was incorporated in New York in 1919, with Kate M. Bostwick, Julia Linthicum, Cynthia M. Westover, Haryot H. Cahoon and Anna Warren Story trustees. The organization disbanded in 1980. The minutes, reports, press books, scrapbooks, correspondence, lists, financial records, and printed materials of the Woman's Press Club of New York City are held by Columbia University Libraries.

== Membership ==
Not all of the club members belonged to the metropolitan press, but all of them had attained some recognition in the field of literature, or a similar profession, which entitled them to membership. Croly, the founder, served as president until her death in 1901. Sara Jane Lippincott was the club's first vice-president.

Beginning with 40 women in 1889, membership increased to over 100 by 1893. Prominent members in the early years of the club were Eliza Archard Conner, of the American Press Association, Eleanor Maria Easterbrook Ames (pseud. Eleanor Kirk), who published a sheet entitled Eleanor Kirk's Ideas, Miss E. G. Gordon of the New York World, Florence Finch Kelly of The San Francisco Examiner, Annie Kershaw DeMontaigue (pseud. Countess Annie de Montaigu), Elita Proctor Otis, Kate M. Bostwick of the Brooklyn Eagle, Hester Martha Poole, Mrs. Jennie Holtzmeyer Posenfeld, wife of Sydney Rosenfeld, Mary Foot Seymour, editor of The Business Woman's Journal, Miriam Leslie, Eliza J. Nicholson of the New Orleans Picayune, and Emma Beckwith, Brooklyn's former candidate for mayor. The executive committee was composed of Bostwick, Connor, Florence Carpenter Ives, and Calrica La Favre. Members wore a purple and gold circlet.

== Meetings ==
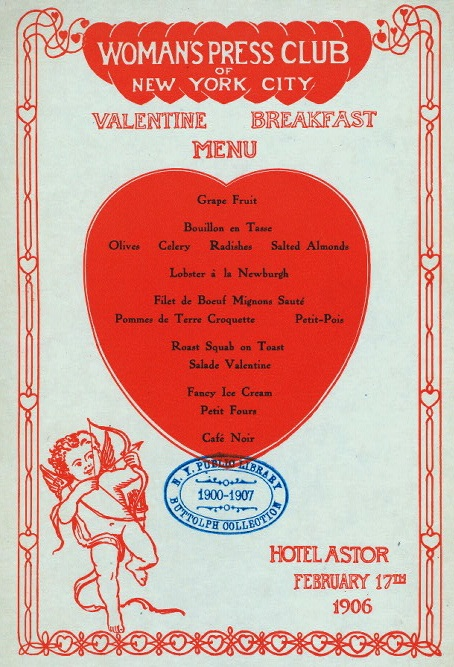
A Valentine's menu at Hotel Astor in 1906

The regular meetings of the club occurred on the second and last Saturdays of each month, except during the months of July, August, and September. The first of these meetings was for business, and the second for social and literary purposes. The rooms were open, however, at any time for the use of the club members, such as for a social chat, or to prepare an article for the press.

== Headquarters ==
The club was located at 126 East 23rd Street, in Manhattan. Tables and light camp chairs necessary for the regular meetings were the first things furnished. Then members contributed furniture, china, and silver. The suite consisted of four apartments and a bathroom. The walls of the large front room, which served as parlor, were of terra cotta with a frieze having in it a tracery of deeper tones. The ceiling was of cream white with tints of dull pink and green, and the floor of parquetry in dark and light woods.

A cherry mantel with tiling of tawny brown was on one side of the room, and against the opposite wall was the president's chair with a long oak table in front of it. This chair was of the Gothic style, in black walnut with leather upholstering, and was purchased with a US$50 check sent for the purpose by Leslie. Over it hung an etching by Kruseman Van Etten, sent by Otis. The table was the gift of the executive committee. The Dagestan rug which lay in front of the table was sent by another member, a pupil of St. Gondins, who also contributed some hand-painted china. Next to the chimney was a bookcase and tea tables. In the large back room the walls were grayish blue, with a frieze of old gold and gilt, while the mantel was of oak with olive tiling. A large Japanese screen was the gift of Croly, and the china cups and saucers in the cupboard were contributions from various members. A Persian cup and two Dresden cups and saucers were from Mrs. Fleming, wife of a prominent New York physician, while the antique chair nearby was the gift of Kate Bostwick. A solid silver tea urn was purchased by the club.

== Notable people ==
- Eleanor Maria Easterbrook Ames (pseud. Eleanor Kirk)
- Emma Beckwith
- Kate M. Bostwick
- Eliza Archard Conner
- Jane Cunningham Croly
- Annie Kershaw DeMontaigue (pseud. Countess Annie de Montaigu)
- Elizabeth Gordon
- Louise Seymour Houghton
- Florence Carpenter Ives
- Florence Finch Kelly
- Carrica Le Favre
- Miriam Leslie
- Sara Jane Lippincott
- Marguerite Moore
- Eliza J. Nicholson
- Elita Proctor Otis
- Mrs. A. M. Palmer
- Hester Martha Poole
- Jennie Holtzmeyer Posenfeld
- Mary Foot Seymour

== Selected works ==
- 1892, Entertainment of the Woman's Press Club of New York : Tuesday afternoon, February ninth, 1892, at the Casino
- 1897, Woman's Press Club of New York City, organized 1889 : constitution and by-laws
- 1904, Memories of Jane Cunningham Croly, "Jenny June"
- 1925–53, A collection of printed material issued by or pertaining to the Woman's Press Club of New York City
