= Hester M. Poole =

American poet

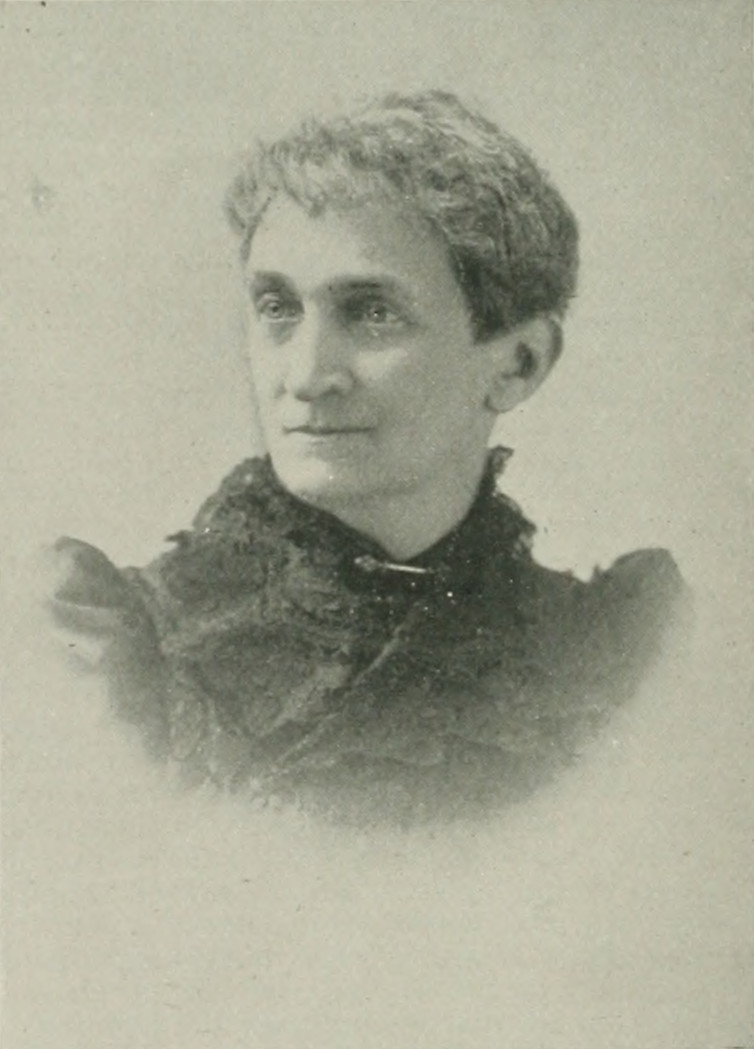
- Photo in A Woman of the Century
- Born: Hester Martha Hunt; May 27, 1833/34; Whiting, Vermont, U.S.
- Died: 1932
- Education: Castleton Seminary
- Occupations: writer, poet, art critic, artist, advocate for women's rights
- Spouse: C. O. Poole (m. 1865)
- Writing career
- Language: English
- Notable works: Fruits and How to Use Them

Hester M. Poole (née, Hunt; May 27, 1833/34 – 1932) was an American non-fiction writer, poet, and artist from Vermont. She began writing at an early age and contributed to numerous publications on a wide variety of topics, including decorative arts and philosophy. Poole traveled extensively and, after her marriage, contributed a series of letters to a New York City daily newspaper from Great Britain and the European continent. She also wrote many unsigned articles, including editorials, art and book criticisms, as well as essays. Poole was an advocate for women's rights and a member of several prominent clubs, including Sorosis and the New York Woman's Press Club.

== Early life and education ==
Hester Martha Hunt was born in Georgia, Vermont, May 27, 1834, or 1833. She was the eighth child of Harry and Mary Staples Hunt, who were emigres from Connecticut to Vermont. The Hunts traced back their ancestry two hundred years, and were of Irish, Scotch and English descent. Harry Hunt, her father, was a soldier in the War of 1812 and 1814, and was a participant in the Battle of Plattsburgh. She was graduated from Castleton Seminary (now Castleton University), at an early age, afterward continuing her studies at Burlington, Vermont. At an early age, she wrote poems and stories, which were often published.

== Career ==
Prostrated from overwork, she went south for her health and engaged in teaching for several years in the states of Mississippi and Tennessee.

After marrying C. O. Poole of New York City on January 14, 1865, Poole became occupied with domestic life. In 1868, the Pooles went abroad, where they traveled, during several months, in Great Britain and on the European continent. During these travels, Poole contributed a series of letters to a daily paper of New York from Edinburgh, London, Paris, Rome, Naples, and Geneva.

Interrupted for some time by domestic duties, her contributions were resumed in the Continent and Manhattan magazines. Those consisted chiefly of illustrated articles upon decorative arts, and were followed in various publications by a large number of critical and descriptive essays upon those and similar topics. Her series of articles applied to the house appeared in the Home Maker, another in Good Housekeeping, and a large number of her illustrated articles appeared from time to time in the Decorator and Furnisher of New York. In them, there were schemes for house decoration, which were widely copied. Another series, "From Attic to Cellar", was furnished to the Home Magazine, and a still longer series, "The Philosophy of Living", was contributed by Poole to Good Housekeeping. She also wrote many unsigned articles, including editorials, art and book criticisms, as well as essays.

In addition to her fondness for art, Poole also studied literary, ethical, and reformatory subjects. Upon one or another of those topics, she frequently gave conversations or lectures in drawing rooms in those fields. Her articles were published in the Chautauquan, the Arena, the Union Signal, the Ladies' Home Journal and many other publications. During several years, she edited a column upon "Woman and the Household" in a weekly newspaper, and also wrote editorials for journals on ethics and reform. Her last book, entitled Fruits and How to Use Them (New York, 1891), was unique -it contained nearly 700 recipes for the preparation of fruits- and attained a large circulation. As a poet, Poole's contributions were less frequent. Some of her verses were included in Harper's Encyclopaedia of Poetry, edited by Epes Sargent.

Poole served as an officer of Sorosis, and furnished a "History of Sorosis" for the Woman's Library Building of the World's Columbian Exposition. She was also a member of the New York Woman's Press Club.

== Personal life ==
She made her home in Metuchen, New Jersey. Poole died in 1932.

== Selected works ==
- "A Buffalo Home". The Decorator and Furnisher. 13 (1): 75–76. 1888. doi:10.2307/25585683. JSTOR 25585683.
- "Dining Room Decorations and Service". The Decorator and Furnisher. 16 (2): 41–42. 1891. doi:10.2307/25586060. JSTOR 25586060.
- "The Summer Cottage of G. Cadwalader Hammill, Esq., at Saratoga Springs". The Decorator and Furnisher. 17 (4): 141–142. 1891. doi:10.2307/25586264. JSTOR 25586264.
- "Decorative Changes at the White House by Mrs. Harrison". The Decorator and Furnisher. 18 (2): 53–56. 1891. doi:10.2307/25586349. JSTOR 25586349.
- "The Residence of Thomas A. Edison, Orange, N. J.". The Decorator and Furnisher. 19 (3): 93–96. 1891. doi:10.2307/25586477. JSTOR 25586477.
- "Embroideries". The Decorator and Furnisher. 25 (4): 139–142. 1895. doi:10.2307/25582976. JSTOR 25582976.
- "A Sky-Parlor or a Bachelor's Den". The Decorator and Furnisher. 26 (5): 171–172. 1895. doi:10.2307/25583162. JSTOR 25583162.
