= Demorest Medal Contests =

System of public oratorical competitions from 1886 to 1897

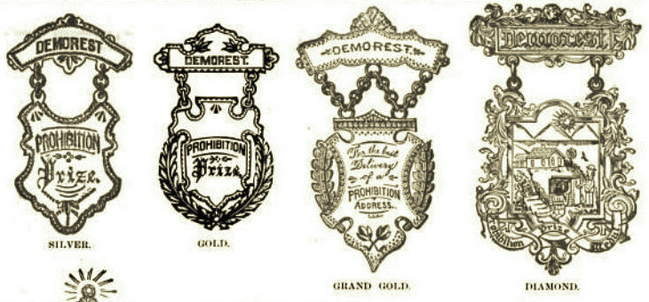
Demorest series of medals

The Demorest Medal Contests (May 9, 1886 – December 1897) were a system of public oratorical competitions, founded as a means of Prohibition propaganda by William Jennings Demorest in April 1886. It was his idea to make these contests promote directly the growth of Prohibition sentiment by enlisting the effort and winning the sympathy of boys, girls, young men, and young women. After Demorest's death, the Demorest medal system was merged with that of the Woman's Christian Temperance Union (WCTU), and Mrs. Demorest (Ellen Louise Demorest) was placed in charge of the Medal Department. She, however, died a few months later (March 1898), and Adelia E. Carman became head of the Medal Department, which position she held until 1922. Mrs. Carman was succeeded by her daughter, Maude Carman Cathcart.

== History ==
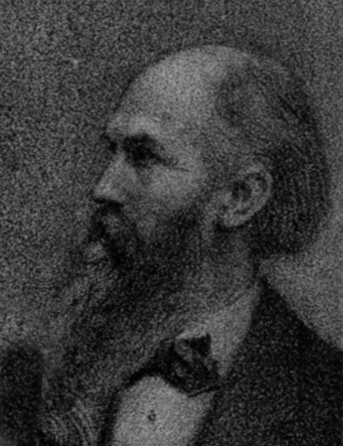
William Jennings Demorest

The first contest was held in Bedford Street Methodist Episcopal Church, New York City, on May 9, 1886. In the following year, Mr. and Mrs. Demorest introduced the plan into California. In less than three years, it had spread throughout the various States and into Canada, Nova Scotia, New Brunswick, Australia, Honolulu, South Africa, China, Burma, and Norway. Up to September 1, 1894, Ms. Demorest had given away 34,000 medals at a cost of US$75,000.

Under the plan, competition was first local and among a class of six or more, for a silver medal; then, over a wider territory, between at least six winners of silver medals, for a gold medal; later still, among the winners of gold medals, for a diamond medal, in final competition. Upon every medal the word "Prohibition" was plainly inscribed. All recitations by contestants avowedly supported the Prohibition policy and Party. All contestants were required to use recitation books, compiled from the best writings and speeches of the Prohibition orators and advocates, and issued by the Medal Contest Bureau. Thousands of these books were circulated.

The popular methods of these contests, the manner of their preparation, and the local interest aroused in them, insured large attendances wherever they were held, and thus multitudes of men and women, not previously concerned or sympathetic, were led to hear Prohibition discussed from the view-point of Prohibitionists. The motto of the medal itself, "From Contest to Conquest", was suggestive of Demorest's own faith and of the purpose held by him and his political associates. The original Demorest medals were furnished free of charge to any one who would drill a class of contestants, on condition that no admission fee was charged and that no collection should be taken from any contest audience.

At the time of his death (1895), it was estimated that Demorest had expended on medals (silver, gold, and diamond) and in maintaining the Medal Bureau more than US$100,000.

Beginning in 1894/6, the prohibition elocution movement in Canada was operated under the management of the national body of the Royal Templars. The Order did not confine the contests to its own societies, but supplied the literature and medals freely to all friendly organizations.

== Merger with the WCTU ==
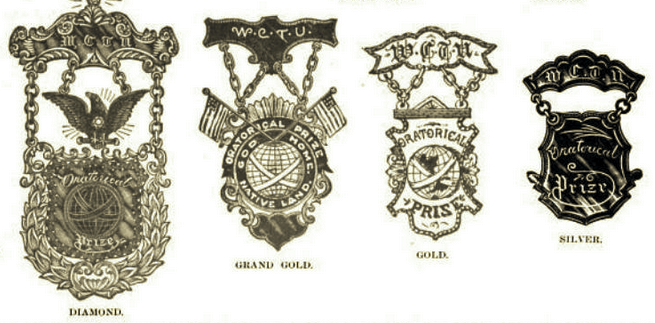
WCTU series of medals

The WCTU was not slow to recognize the value of this educational system, and soon members of the organization adapted the idea of Medal Contests to its many lines of work. A plan for the organization of a system of distinctly WCTU medal contests was presented to Frances Willard by Adelia Carman, of Chicago, in December, 1895. The general officers of the National WCTU gave their approval, and Carman was directed to inaugurate the work and report the results to the St. Louis Convention the following year, when the system was adopted by a National department of work and Carman named as the superintendent. Recitation books, embracing orations on Prohibition, Total Abstinence, Scientific Temperance, Anti-Narcotics, Franchise, Social Purity, and other topics, were published. Medals were designed with mottoes and emblems of the WCTU, and circulars setting forth the plans of this new system sent out to all the States in the Union.

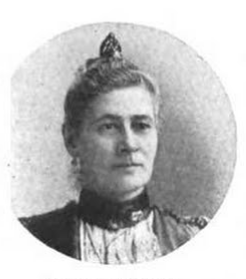
Ellen Louise Demorest

At the World's WCTU Convention, held in Toronto, Canada, in October 1897, medal work was adopted as a department and Mrs. Demorest named as World's Superintendent. Soon after that convention, Carman received a letter from Mrs. Demorest, in which she said:—

"I am delighted that you are appointed my associate in medal contests, and as you are at the head of the W. C. T. U. work I feel that it is well to consolidate the two as nearly as possible. The only thought Mr. Demorest had was to educate the rising generation in the principles of total abstinence for the individual and the inherent right of the people to enact the prohibition of the sale of intoxicants for the State and Nation. So long as you adhere to that work you will fulfill his wishes and ours, and we shall not care which medal is used."

In December 1897, nearly two years after the death of Mr. Demorest, the Demorest Medal Contest system and that of the WCTU were united. Mrs. Demorest held the position as World's Superintendent until her death in March 1898, when she was succeeded by Carman, who had previously served as her assistant.

== Notable people ==
- Ellen A. Dayton Blair
- Mary Latimer McLendon
