= Marguerite Moore =

Irish orator, patriot, activist

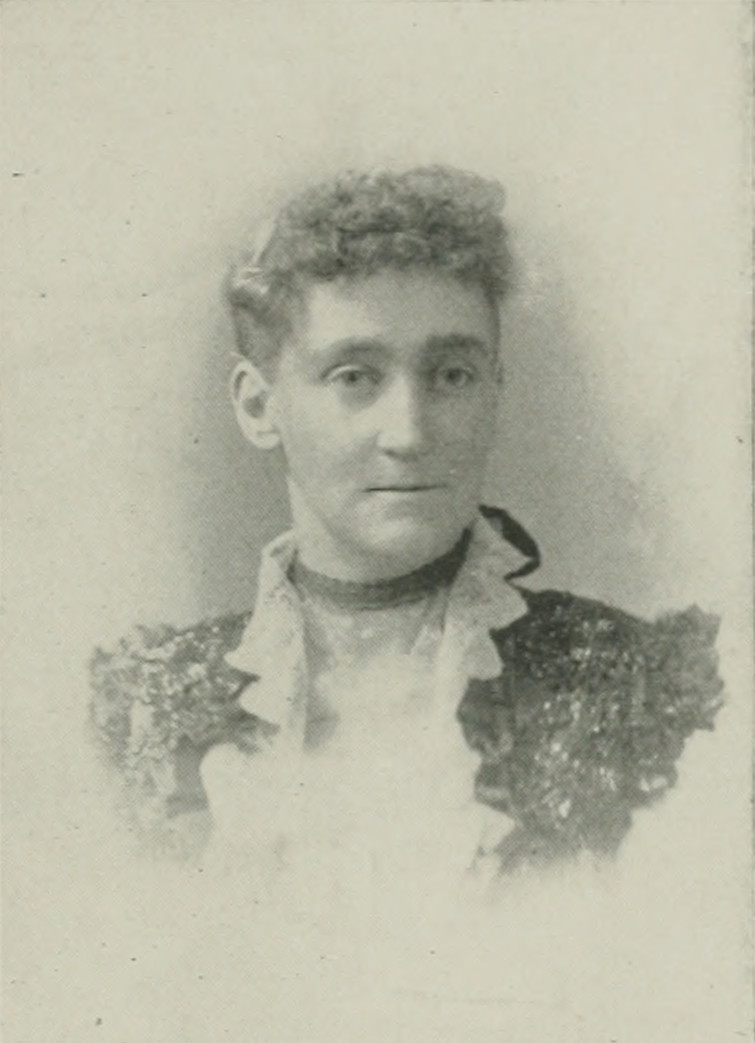
- Pictured in A Woman of the Century
- Born: Marguerite Nagle; 7 July 1846; Waterford
- Died: 6 February 1933 (aged 86); White Plains, New York
- Known for: Nationalist, Suffragette and other activism
- Spouse: John Henry Moore

Marguerite Moore (née Nagle; 7 July 1846 – 6 February 1933) was an Irish-Catholic orator, patriot, and activist. A nationalist and suffragist, she was referred to as the "first suffragette".

== Early years and education ==
Marguerite Moore was born in Waterford, Ireland, on 7 July 1846. She was orphaned at the age of 12 and was enrolled in the Sacred Heart Convent boarding school in Roscrea, Tipperary. She later married John Henry Moore and moved to Moville, Co. Donegal, becoming a founding member of the local Ladies' Land League branch.

== Career ==
In 1881, she sprang into a foremost place in the politics of her native land. Charles Stewart Parnell and the rest of the national and local leaders were in prison, and the existence of the great organization they had built up was imperiled. Anna Catherine Parnell, the sister of Charles Stewart Parnell, called on the women of Ireland to help in the struggle. Mrs. Moore's patriotism, sympathy for the suffering and eloquence made of her an invaluable auxiliary. She threw herself into the struggle, which had for its aim the fixing of the Irish tenant farmer in his holding and the succoring of the tenants already evicted. She traveled throughout Ireland, teaching the doctrine of the Irish National Land League, and bringing help to the victims of landlord tyranny. In all the large cities of England and Scotland, she addressed crowded meetings. After twelve months, she was arrested and sentenced to six months' imprisonment in Tullamore jail, Kings county, Ireland. Refusing bail, she served the entire sentence.

In the summer of 1882, when Mr. Parnell and his followers were released from prison, the women returned into their hands the trust they had so faithfully guarded. Two years afterwards Mrs. Moore, accompanied by her family of four girls and two boys, came to the United States. Here she gained a reputation as a speaker on social matters, women's suffrage, labor questions and land reform. Any good cause found in her an able platform advocate. She used her pen in defense of the oppressed. She took a deep interest in American politics, as a believer in the single-tax doctrines. She took a prominent part in the New York City election campaigns of 1886–87, addressing two or three meetings each evening. Before and after 1916, she worked as a fundraiser and public speaker, and was active in demonstrations. In 1920, she was involved in a three-and-a-half-week strike.

She was a vice-president of the Universal Peace Union, a member of the Woman's Press Club of New York City, treasurer and secretary of the Parnell Branch of the Irish National League, and prominent in the literary society of New York City.
