= Ellen A. Dayton Blair =

American social reformer and art teacher (1837–1926)

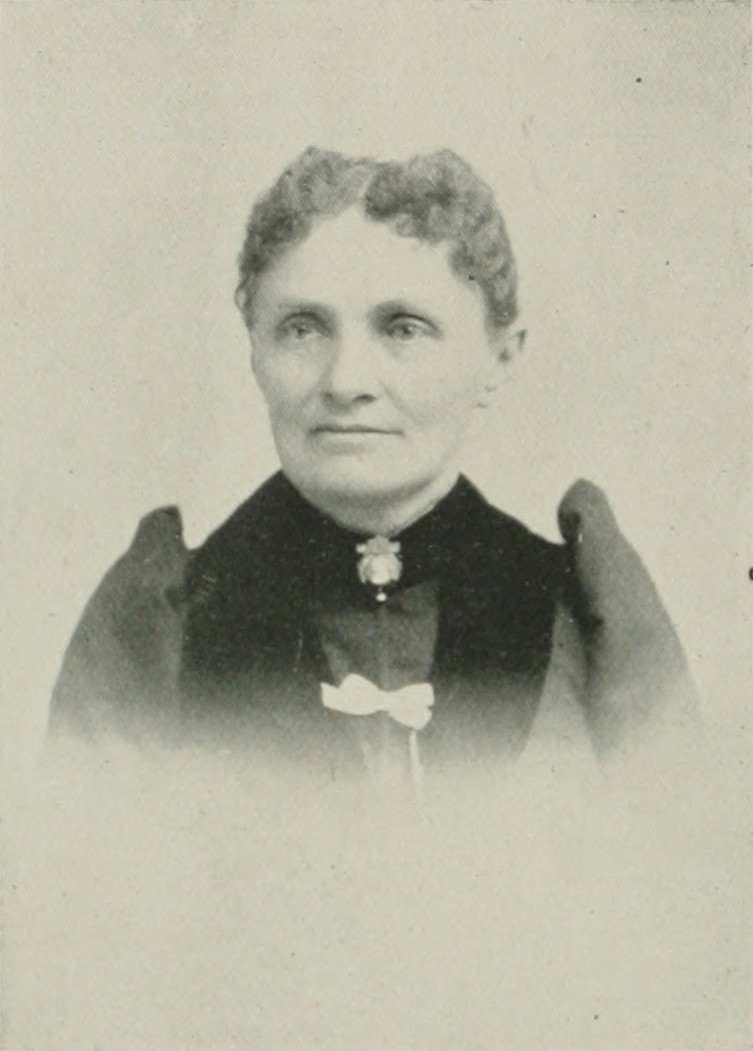
Photo portrait from A Woman of the Century

Ellen A. Dayton Blair (December 27, 1837 – 1926) was an American social reformer and art teacher.

== Early years and education ==
Ellen A. Dayton was born near Vernon Center, New York, December 27, 1827. Her parents were Erastus Dayton and Adeline Lucinda Brown Dayton.

She was graduated in the classical course from Fort Edward Institute, New York, in 1837.

== Career ==
In the same year as her graduation, she accepted the position of preceptress in Upper Iowa University, Fayette, Iowa. She remained in that institution one year, having charge of the art department. Soon after she married Emery H. Blair, of Iowa, at one time professor of mathematics in Clinton Liberal Institute, in Clinton, Oneida County, New York. Both were strong in anti-slavery and prohibition sentiments. During the Women's Crusade, Blair discovered her ability as a temperance speaker. Loving the cause and zealous in its behalf, she worked on its behalf.

Blair had five sons, three of whom were living by 1893. Young men were her special focus during the Crusade and in Sunday school work. Moving to Wisconsin in 1881, she began her illustrative talks to children, on the invitation of Mary Bannister Willard, and later was made superintendent of the juvenile department for Wisconsin. In 1885, she was elected to her position as national organizer and "chalk talker" of the juvenile department of the Woman's Christian Temperance Union (WCTU). In fulfillment of her duties, she visited nearly every State and Territory, as well as Canada, and was a member of nearly every national convention. After removing to Creighton, Nebraska, she has continued her work in the same field. During the prohibitory amendment campaign in that State, she was one of the leaders. As superintendent of the Demorest Medal Contests, which occupied much of her time and that of several assistants, under her supervision, Nebraska lead the world in that line of temperance work. At the Ninth Convention of the World's WCTU, held in Brooklyn, New York, October 23–28, 1913, she was a U.S. delegate from Southern California.

Blair's greatest influence as a temperance worker lay in her illustrative talks, by which she interested young and old. She was a natural artist and, when not engaged in public duties, devoted herself to teaching oil painting, drawing and crayon work.

She died in 1926 and is buried at Sunset Hill Cemetery in Clinton.
