= Demorest's Illustrated Monthly =

- Editor-in-chief: William Jennings Demorest
- Founder: William Jennings Demorest
- Founded: 1860; 166 years ago
- Final issue: 1899 (print)
- Country: United States
- Language: English

Demorest's Illustrated Monthly was a publication in the United States that operated from 1860 to 1899.

It was published by William Jennings Demorest as part of the retail store, publishing, and dress pattern business empire operated by Demorest and his wife Ellen Louise Demorest. Jane Cunningham Croly, who served as its editor from 1860 to 1887, helped it advocate for female education and employment. Other contributors included Louisa May Alcott and Julia Ward Howe.

== History ==
The paper was established as Mme. Demorest’s Mirror of Fashions, a quarterly publication, in 1860. It became monthly in 1863 and attained its expanded title in 1864 after Demorest acquired New York Illustrated News and merged it into the publication. "Illustrated" was dropped from the title in 1865. In 1879, it was retitled Demorest's Family Magazine. It later became Demorest’s Monthly Magazine. Competition, including from Ebenezer Butterick, pressured the Demorest's business and their pattern business was sold in 1887. The last issue of their publication was in 1899.

The magazine offered illustrations of fashions (plates) and a dress pattern stapled into the pages. It covered the fashions worn by Empress Eugenie. It included advertisements for Demorest cosmetics and corsets. Elaborate covers were created from wood engravings.

The company also published Demorest's Young America and Demorest's Family Magazine Portrait Album.

Ellen Louise Demorest was involved with the New York Medical College for Women, Welcome Lodging House for Women and Children, Sorosis club for women, and advocated for women workers, including African Americans.

== Gallery ==
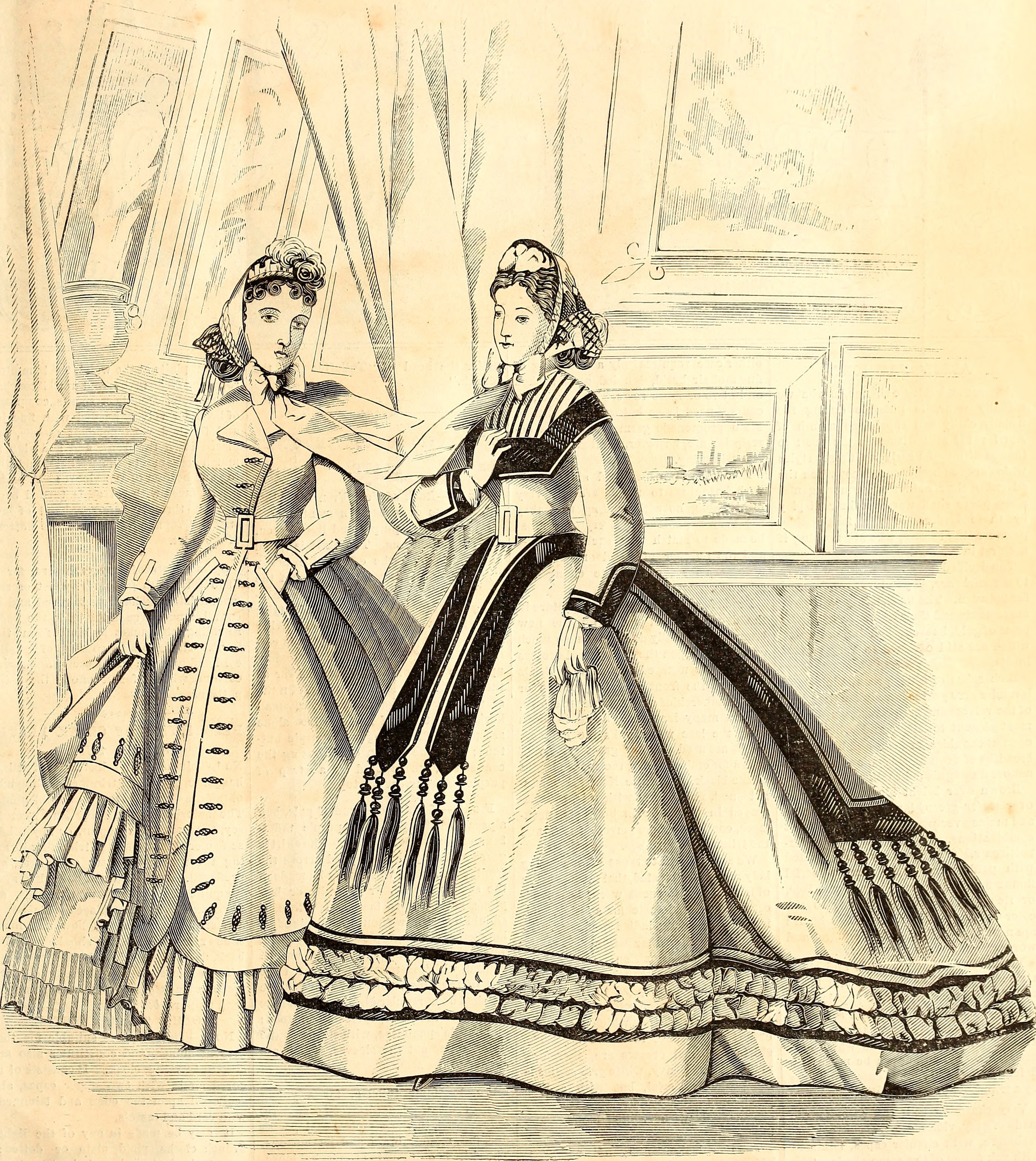

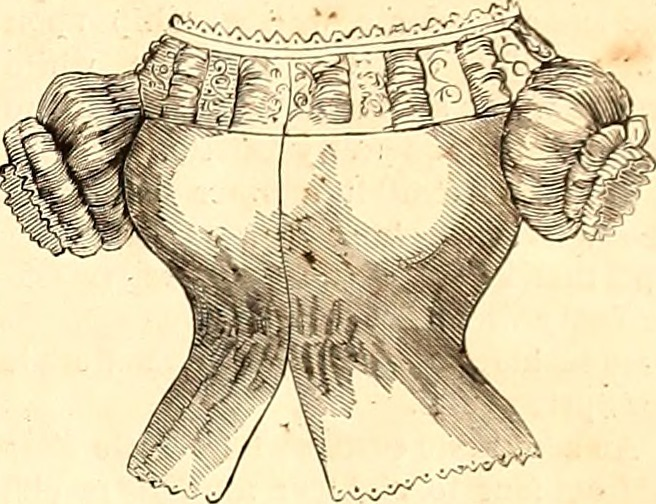

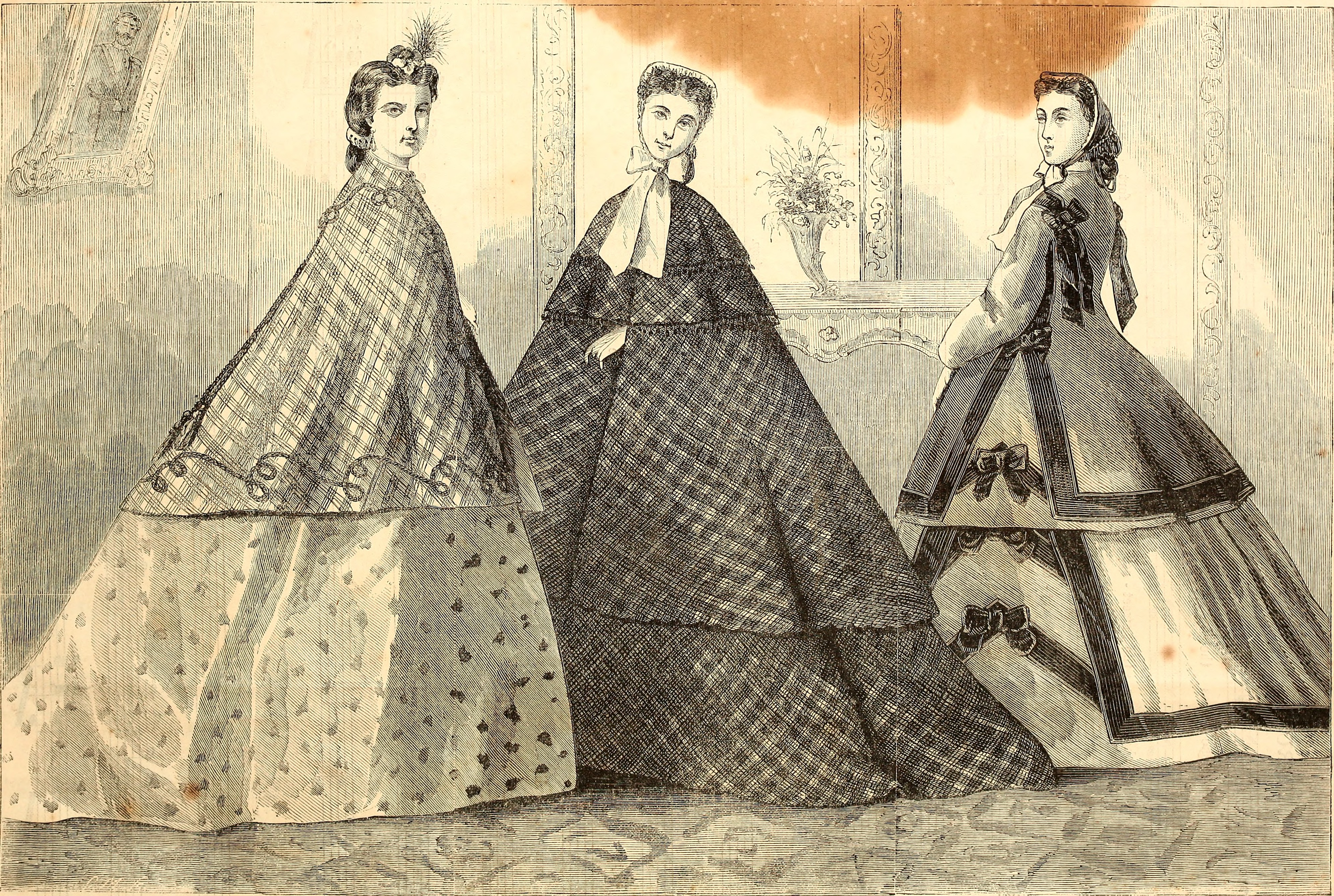
