= Joseph J. Little =

American politician

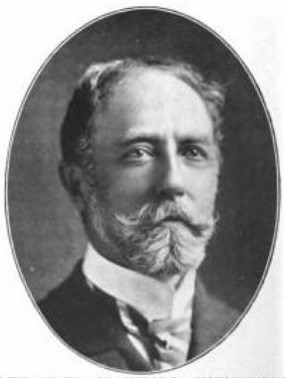

Member of the U.S. House of Representatives from New York's 12th district
- In office November 3, 1891 – March 3, 1893
- Preceded by: Roswell P. Flower
- Succeeded by: W. Bourke Cockran

Personal details
- Born: June 5, 1841 Bristol, England
- Died: February 11, 1913 (aged 71) New York, New York, US
- Resting place: Kensico Cemetery, Valhalla, New York, US

Joseph James Little (June 5, 1841 – February 11, 1913) was an American printer by trade who served as a U.S. representative from New York from 1891 to 1893, after winning a special election to fill a vacancy caused by the resignation of Roswell P. Flower.

Little was a veteran of the American Civil War.

== Biography ==
Born in Bristol, England, Little immigrated with his parents to the United States in 1846. The family settled in Morris, New York. He attended the common schools, was apprenticed to the local printer and entered a New York book-printing office to complete his trade.

=== Civil War ===
During the American Civil War, he served in the Union Army from 1862 to 1864, as corporal, first sergeant, and first lieutenant.

=== Later career ===
Little founded a printing and publishing house with a junior partner: his former employer, Mr. Rennie. A third associate joining in the venture, the three with the combined capital of $5,000 started the printing office of Little, Rennie & Co. on Broome Street in 1867. Being practical and hard working men they made their way by inches.

In 1873, William Jennings Demorest joined the firm and brought them the printing of his fashion papers. The business finally grew quite large and in 1871 was moved to an uptown location. In his present large quarters on Astor place, they do an enormous business in the printing of books, magazines, etc., employing about 500 persons. The present title of J. J. Little & Co. was adopted in 1876.

Little served as commissioner of education and president of the Board of Education of New York City.

In 1881, Little commissioned architect William Wheeler Smith to design a five-story building at 28 East 14th Street (between Fifth Avenue and University Place). The building made then-novel use of cast iron in its facade, enabling large street-facing bay windows that bringing ample light to the floors within, attracted artists and manufacturers to the building shortly after its completion." Other tenants of the building included painter William Michael Harnett. In the 1920s, it was used as the headquarters of the young U.S. Communist Party and home to its New York Workers School. In 1936, it was home to the Revolutionary Workers League, a radical left group formed by Hugo Oehler.

=== Congress ===
Little was elected as a Democrat to the 52nd Congress to fill the vacancy caused by the resignation of Roswell P. Flower and served from November 3, 1891, to March 3, 1893. He was not a candidate for renomination in 1892 to the Fifty-third Congress.

He remained in the printing and publishing business until his death in New York City on February 11, 1913.

=== Death ===
He died on February 11, 1913, and was interred in Kensico Cemetery, Valhalla, New York.

=== Family ===
Little's son was the tennis player Raymond D. Little.

== Sources ==
- United States Congress. "Joseph J. Little (id: L000353)". Biographical Directory of the United States Congress.

U.S. House of Representatives
Preceded by Roswell P. Flower	Member of the U.S. House of Representatives from New York's 11th congressional district 1891–1893	Succeeded by William Bourke Cockran
