= Eliza Archard Conner =

American journalist (1838–1912)

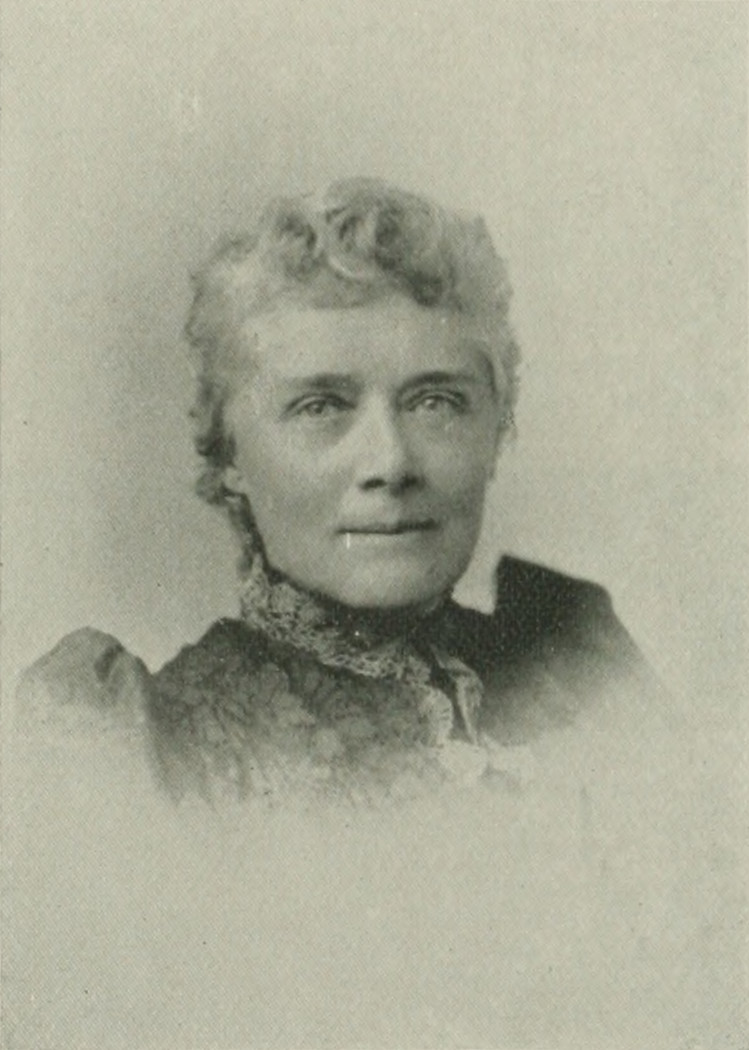
- Photo in A Woman of the Century
- Born: Eliza Archard; January 4, 1838; Monroe Township, Clermont County, Ohio, U.S.
- Died: June 4, 1912 (aged 74); Manhattan, New York, U.S.
- Education: Antioch College
- Occupations: Writer; lecturer; feminist
- Spouse: Dr. George Conner
- Writing career
- Pen name: Zig; E.A.

Eliza Archard Conner (née, Archard; pen names, Zig; E. A.; January 4, 1838 – June 4, 1912) was an American writer, journalist, novelist, lecturer, teacher, and feminist of the long nineteenth century. Hailing from Ohio, Conner began writing for newspapers at the age of 13. She served in various roles for the Saturday Evening Post, of Philadelphia, the Commercial of Cincinnati, and the New York World of New York City. She also worked towards the emancipation and advancement of women.

== Early life and education ==
Eliza Archard was born January 4, 1838, in Monroe Township, Clermont County, Ohio, on a farm near Cincinnati. Her parents were James and Jane Archard. Her ancestors were of Quaker, German Moravian, Irish and English Presbyterian background. They were among the pioneers of southern Ohio, and one of them founded the town of New Richmond. She was educated in Antioch College, Yellow Springs, Ohio, taking the full course in classics and higher mathematics. Her first newspaper contribution was printed when she was 13 years old.

== Career ==
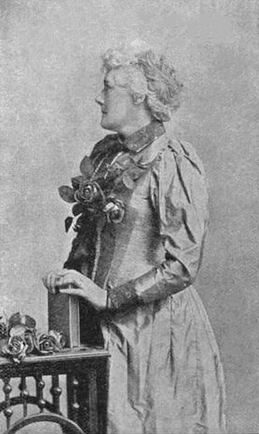

In her early career, she was a teacher and instructor in Latin and German in the Indianapolis High School. There, her persistent refusal to accept less wages than had been previously paid to a man teacher for doing the same work resulted in the passing of a rule by the school board that teachers of both sexes in the high school should receive the same salary. In 1865, she became a regular contributor to the Saturday Evening Post, of Philadelphia, under the name of "Zig." Later, she wrote for the Cincinnati Commercial, (later, Cincinnati Commercial Tribune) signing the initials "E. A"; she joined the editorial staff in 1878.

Conner went to New York City in 1884, serving as a literary editor of the New York World. In the following year, she accepted a place on the editorial staff of the American Press Association syndicate in New York. In editorial writing, she regularly furnished two columns daily of 1,000 words each. Connor performed various types of newspaper work, including police-court reporting, as well as editing a live-stock and dairy department, and served as a war correspondent, covering the Philippine–American War. Her letters to the Commercial from Europe were published in a volume called "E. A. Abroad" (Cincinnati, 1883). She also wrote several serial stories. An important part of her work for the American Press Association was the preparation of a series of newspaper pages of war history, describing the battles of the American Civil War. Conner is also remembered as a novelist, and for her address before the International Press Congress of Chicago.

In her girlhood, Conner worked towards the emancipation and advancement of women. She originated classes in parliamentary usage and extempore speaking among women. Wherever occasion permitted, she wrote and spoke in favor of equal pay for equal work, and of widening the industrial field for women. She was deeply interested in psychological studies and in oriental philosophy, accepting the ancient doctrine of reincarnation. She was an enthusiast on the subject of physical culture for women, believing that people were meant to live outdoors and sleep in houses. She was a member of Sorosis and of the Woman's Press Club of New York City.

== Personal life ==
On January 1, 1869, she married Dr. George Conner (born 1844), of Cincinnati. His paternal and maternal ancestors saw active service in the American Revolutionary War. He attended the district school of his neighborhood. In 1862, he enlisted in Company G, Fiftieth O. V. L, and participated with that regiment in many battles and skirmishes. He was with Gen. William Tecumseh Sherman during his Atlanta campaign, and was also with Gen. George Henry Thomas at the battle of Jacksborough, July 22, 1862. At the close of the war, Dr. Conner returned home, and soon afterward entered Parker's Academy where he was graduated in 1800. He attended Miami Medical College, from which he was graduated in 1872, with the degree of Medical Doctor, and he at once began the practice of medicine in Cincinnati. He took an active interest in the Cincinnati Academy of Medicine, and the Ohio State Medical Society. He frequently wrote for newspapers and various periodicals.

Conner and her husband were the parents of one child, Halstead A., who was connected with Specker Brothers & Company, Cincinnati.

Eliza Archard Conner died from cancer on June 4, 1912, at in the Audubon Sanatorium in Manhattan.

== Selected works ==
- 1883, "E. A." Abroad: A Summer in Europe
