= Eleanor Kirk =

American author, businesswoman, suffragist, and publisher

Eleanor Ames
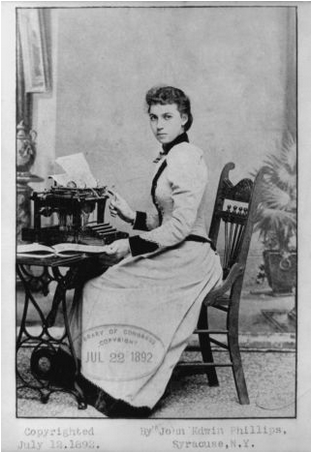
- Photograph by John Edwin Phillips, 1892. Courtesy Library of Congress.
- Born: Eleanor Maria Easterbrook; October 7, 1831; Warren, Rhode Island, U.S.
- Died: June 20, 1908 (aged 76); Weekapaug, Rhode Island, U.S.
- Resting place: Warren, Rhode Island
- Other name: "Nellie"
- Occupations: businesswoman; writer; publisher
- Spouses: Samuel Smith Child (m. 1849; died 1850); Wilber Fisk Hubbell (m. 1852; died 1854); William G. Ames (m. 1856; died 1871)
- Children: Samuell S. Child; Wilbur Fisk Hubbell; Edward Griffin Ames; Joseph Seymour Ames; Mary E. Ames
- Writing career
- Pen name: Eleanor Kirk
- Language: English
- Notable work: Eleanor Kirk's Idea

Eleanor Ames (née, Easterbrook; after first marriage, Child; after second marriage, Hubbell; after third marriage, Ames; October 7, 1831 – June 20, 1908), better known by her pen name, Eleanor Kirk, was an American author, businesswoman, newspaper publisher, and suffragist. Kirk was a "Mental Scientist" and was interested in astrology. She wrote a number of books and published a magazine entitled Eleanor Kirk's Idea. She was also a regular contributor to The Revolution and Packard's Monthly.

== Early life ==
Eleanor (sometimes, "Ellen") (nickname, "Nellie") Maria Easterbrook (sometimes, "Easterbrooks") was born in Warren, Rhode Island, on October 7, 1831. Her parents were George Easterbrooks and his wife, Elizabeth.

== Career ==
By 1860, she was living in Brooklyn, New York. She wrote a number of books under the pen name "Eleanor Kirk" designed to assist young writers, and she published a magazine entitled Eleanor Kirk's Idea, for the same purpose. Her works included Up Broadway, and its Sequel (New York, 1870), Periodicals that Pay Contributors (Brooklyn; privately printed), Information for Authors (Brooklyn, 1888); and as editor, Henry Ward Beecher as a Humorist (New York, 1887), The Beecher Book of Days (New York, 1886), and Perpetual Youth. She was also a regular contributor to The Revolution and Packard's Monthly, and was a member of the Woman's Press Club of New York City.

In 1870, the New York Herald stated that she was "the most pronounced of the women’s rights women".

=== Eleanor Kirk's Idea ===
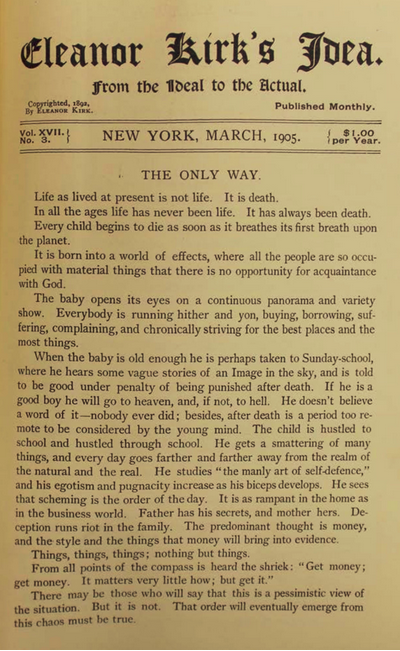
Eleanor Kirk's Idea (1905)

The promotion of Eleanor Kirk's Idea – from the Ideal to the Actual stated that "... the editor of this journal has worked out some perplexing problems. Because of this, she desires to show others the processes by which she did her sums. In other words, how to be happy instead of wretched, rich instead of poor, well and strong instead of sick and weak, good looking instead of haggard and ugly." The subscription price was US$1 per year, and single copies were available at $0.10 each. The publishing address was 696 Green Avenue, Brooklyn, New York.

== Personal life ==
Before the age of 40, she had been widowed three times and had five children requiring her support. On November 18, 1849, at Warren, Rhode Island, she married Samuel Smith Child (1820–1850), and was widowed the following year. Their child, Samuell S. Child, was born in 1851. About 1852, in Rhode Island, she married Wilber Fisk Hubbell (1830–1854), and they had a son, Wilbur Fisk Hubbell (b. 1854), before she was widowed in 1854. On November 10, 1856, at Warren, Rhode Island, she married William G. Ames (1833–1871) and was widowed for the third time in 1871. Their children were: Edward Griffin Ames (1858–1898), Joseph Seymour Ames (1863–1889), and Mary E. Ames (1865–1933).

Eleanor Kirk died June 20, 1908, at Weekapaug, Rhode Island.

== Selected works ==
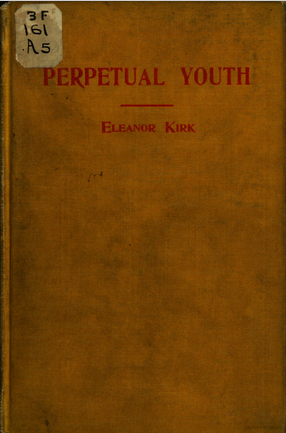
Perpetual Youth

- n.d., Libra: an astrological romance
- 1890, Periodicals that pay contributors, to which is added a list of publishing houses
- 1894, The Influence of the Zodiac upon Human Life
- 1895, Perpetual Youth
- 1897, Where you are: talks with girls
- 1901, The Christ of the Red Planet
- 1887, Beecher as a Humorist: Selections from the published works of Henry Ward Beecher
