= William Jennings Demorest =

American magazine publisher and prohibitionist (1822–1895)

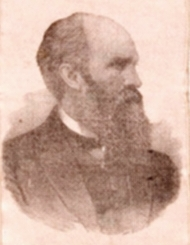
- Born: 1822
- Died: 1895 (aged 72–73)
- Occupations: Magazine publisher; prohibitionist; businessman
- Political party: Prohibition Party
- Spouses: Margaret Willamina Poole (m. 1845; died 1857) Ellen Louise Curtis (m. 1858)
- Children: 4

William Jennings Demorest (1822–1895) was an American magazine publisher, prohibition leader, and businessman from New York City.

== Early life ==
Demorest was born in 1822.

== Career ==
In collaboration with his second wife, Ellen Demorest (née Curtis) he attained international success from his wife's development of paper patterns printed in Demorest's Illustrated Monthly. Together, they built a fashion manufacturing and merchandising empire from it.

He and his wife launched five magazines and started a cosmetics company. He individually patented a sewing machine and a velocipede.

Demorest harbored lifelong political and religious aspirations. He is widely known for being a Prohibition activist and ran for Mayor of New York City on the Prohibition ticket. He also organized the Anti-Nuisance League.

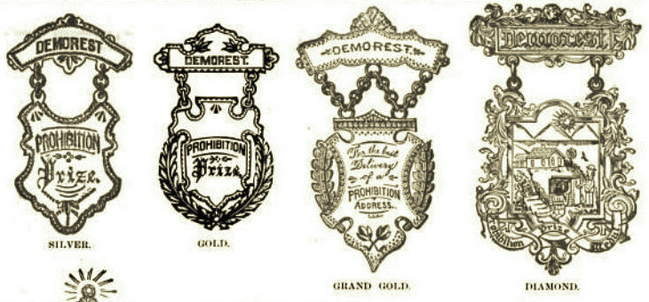
Demorest series of medals

The Demorest Medal Contests were a system of public oratorical competitions, founded as a means of Prohibition propaganda by Demorest in April, 1886. At the time of his death (1895) it was estimated that he had expended on medals (silver, gold, and diamond) and in maintaining the Medal Bureau more than US$100,000. After his death, the Demorest medal system was merged with that of the Woman's Christian Temperance Union, and Mrs. Demorest was placed in charge of the Medal Department.

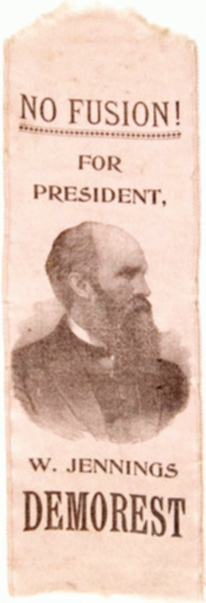

== Magazines ==
- 1860: Mme Demorest's Mirror of Fashions was first published as a quarterly

- Summer 1863 — Mirror of Fashions became a monthly
- January 1864 — Demorest purchased New York Illustrated News
- September 1864 — Demorest combined New York Illustrated News with the Mirror of Fashions

- January 1879 — Changed the name to Demorest Family Magazine
- October 1899 — Final publication of Demorest Family Magazine

- Demorest Monthly Magazine, The
- Demorest's Illustrated News
- Demorest's Illustrated Monthly Magazine

In 1873, Demorest joined the printing firm of Little, Rennie & Co. (founded in 1867 by Joseph James Little). In 1876, the firm became known as J.J. Little & Company.

=== Location of operations ===
- Demorest Studio Building — 4 & 6 W 14th St

== Personal life ==
In 1845, Demorest married Margaret Willamina Poole (1823–1857), daughter of Joseph and Jeannette Poole. While living on Varick Street, they had two children: Vienna Willamina Demorest (1847–1913) and Henry Clay Demorest (1850–1928).

On April 15, 1858, Demorest married Ellen Louise Curtis (1825–1898) — a fashion arbiter. His wife gave birth to a son in 1859 and a daughter in 1865.

He was a member of the Prohibition Party (New York City)

== Death and legacy ==
He died in 1895

Demorest, Georgia is named in his honor.

== Other interests ==
In 1881 he published the song, Sweet Wind of Eve, by Henry Tucker.
