= Florence Finch Kelly =

American novelist, journalist

Florence Finch Kelly (March 27, 1858 – December 17, 1939) was an American feminist, suffragist, journalist and author of novels and short stories.

== Biography ==
Florence Finch was born in Girard, Illinois, March 27, 1858. She was the youngest child of two daughters and six sons of James Gardner Finch and Mary Ann Finch (née Purdum). Her father was a farmer in Illinois and Kansas, where the family moved by covered wagon. Charles Sumner Finch, one of her brothers, became a newspaper publisher in Kansas.

Kelly attended a county high school in Miami County, Kansas and graduated from the University of Kansas with A.B. in 1881 and with A.M. in 1884.

She married in Boston the newspaper publisher Allen P. Kelly on 9 December 1884; they had a son, Morton, who died in childhood and another son, Sherwin Kelly, who became a noted geophysicist.

Kelly contributed many articles to the Boston Globe and the anarchist periodical Liberty. In 1906, she visited New Zealand and Australia to study the effects of social and economic legislation in those countries and wrote numerous magazine articles related to the social and economic changes. She worked on the staff of the New York Times as a book reviewer from 1906 to the mid-1930s. In addition to seven novels and numerous short stories and magazine articles on literary, artistic, and economic subjects, Florence Finch Kelly wrote an autobiography Flowing Stream: The Story of Fifty-six Years in American Newspaper Life (1939). She died in New Hartford, Connecticut in 1939.

== Selected works ==
=== Novels ===
- Frances: A Story for Men and Women (1889)
- On the Inside (1890)
- With Hoops of Steel (1900)
- The Delafield Affair (1909)
- Rhoda of the Underground (1909)
- The Fate of Felix Brand (1913)
- The Dixons: A Story of American Life through Three Generations (1921)

=== Short story collection ===
- Emerson's Wife and Other Western Stories (1911)
