= Jane Cunningham Croly =

American author and journalist

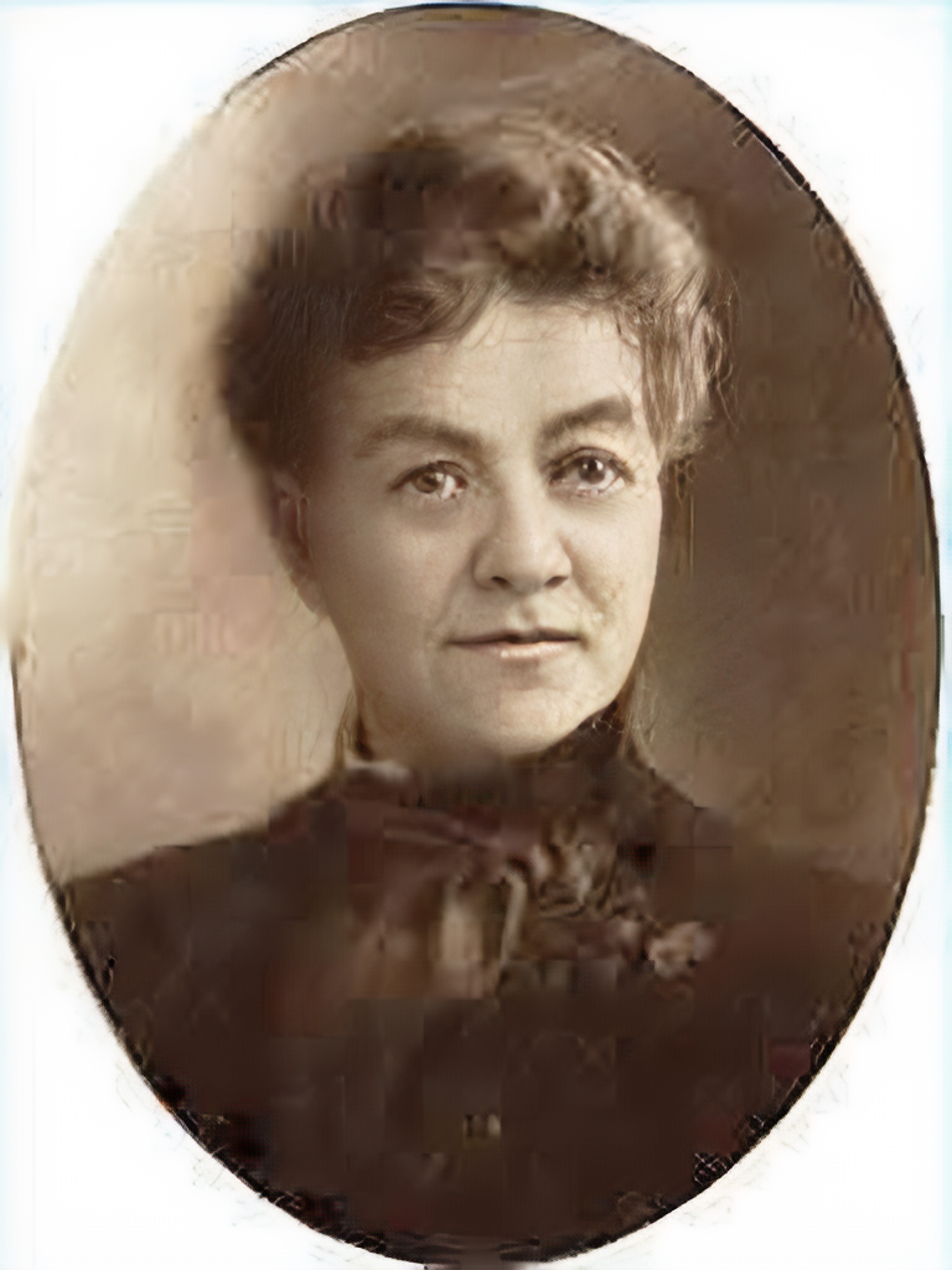
- Born: Jane Cunningham; December 19, 1829; Market Harborough, Leicestershire, England
- Died: December 23, 1901 (aged 72); New York City, New York, U.S.
- Resting place: Lakewood Township, New Jersey, U.S.
- Occupations: Author, journalist
- Spouse: David Goodman Croly (m. 1856; died 1889)
- Children: 4, including Herbert
- Writing career
- Pen name: Jennie June

Jane Cunningham Croly (née Cunningham; December 19, 1829 – December 23, 1901) was an American author and journalist, better known by her pseudonym, Jennie June. She was a pioneer author and editor of women's columns in leading newspapers and magazines in New York. She founded the Sorosis club for women in New York in 1868 and in 1889 expanded it nationwide to the General Federation of Women's Clubs. She also founded the Woman's Press Club of New York City.

== Early life ==
Jane Cunningham was born in England, the daughter of a Unitarian minister, Reverend Joseph Cunningham, and his wife Jane Scott. The family emigrated to the United States when Jane was twelve. The family first lived in Poughkeepsie, New York, and later in Southbridge, Massachusetts.

== Professional career ==
Jane first became interested in journalism while a student; she started by editing the school newspaper. Later, she edited and published the newspaper for her brother's church. By 1855, she had moved to New York to seek journalism work. Some sources say it was there she first used the pseudonym "Jennie June". Other sources say that "Jennie June" was a childhood nickname, given to her by a family friend when Jennie was twelve years old.

After unsuccessfully applying to several newspapers, she was hired by Noah's Sunday Times (often erroneously reported as The New York Times) edited by Mordecai Manuel Noah. At Noah's, she wrote a regular women's column, focusing on such traditional subjects as fashion, cooking and the arts. She later recalled this time as challenging since few newspapers wanted to hire a woman, and if they did, it was only in the topics of "women's interests". There was great resistance from male editors about hiring a woman to cover news or do serious reporting outside of what was considered women's sphere.

As a result of her journalism career, she met her husband, fellow journalist and editor for the New York Herald, David G. Croly. They were married on St. Valentine's Day February 14, 1856. They had three daughters, Minnie, Viola and Alice, and one son, Herbert David. Herbert Croly went on to a career in journalism, becoming editor of The New Republic magazine. She later told interviewers that thanks to her husband, her career in journalism advanced. He hired her at New York World, and her career progressed from then on.

While most women were expected to abandon their career after marrying, Jennie June continued to work, and did so after having children. She was the editor of Demorest's Magazine from 1860 to 1887. This magazine was devoted to women's fashions, and Jennie became known as an expert in the subject, widely quoted in other publications. She was later the editor of the Cycle Magazine (which she founded) and also the Home-Maker Magazine. Her columns were often syndicated on women's pages throughout the United States.

== Feminist ==
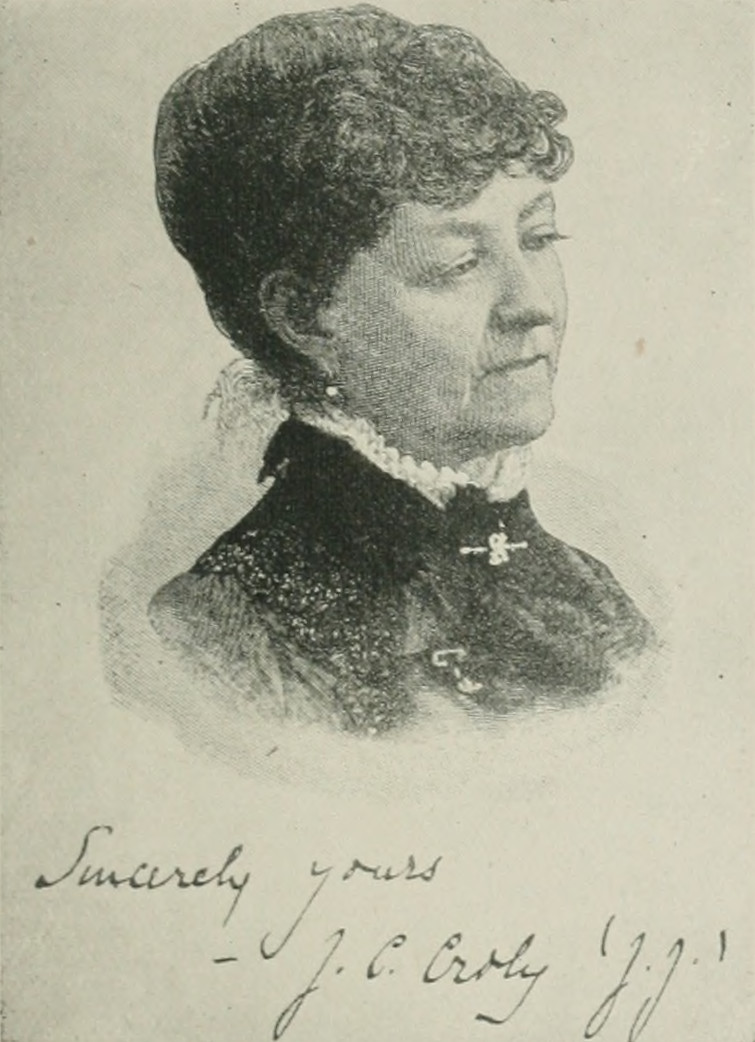
Croly, circa 1897

Croly was a pioneer feminist, dedicated to the betterment of her sex. She called for more efficiency in women's dress and ridiculed bloomers as bizarre. She insisted that women's finest work was to be "the caretakers, the homemakers, the educators of children". Croly sympathized with the women's suffrage movement but was not active in it. She strongly supported equality and equal rights, giving special emphasis to new careers for middle-class women such as secretary, bookkeeper, nursing and department store clerk, in addition to traditional roles of teaching. Schlesinger argues that "Croly's lasting contribution to the progress of American women was her insistence that sex be submerged in competent performance". She told American women that financial independence and economic equality was as or more important than the right to vote.

She called the first congresses of women in 1856 and 1869, organized Sorosis in 1869; it was an organization that advocated for greater acceptance and more professional opportunities for women. It did not concern itself with politics or women's suffrage. Jennie June told the press that she envisioned the club, (whose name is a Greek botanical term for a kind of tree that yields various kinds of fruits and flowers) as a salon where women could gather and exchange ideas, enjoy literature, and discuss the arts. She later organized its successor, the General Federation of Women's Clubs) in 1890; she also founded the New York Woman's Press Club in 1889 and became its first president. Early meetings were held in her home.

== Final years ==
In her later years, Jennie June Croly was often referred to in the press as the "Mother of Women's Clubs", a term that was also mentioned when newspapers reported on how she became ill in the summer of 1898. She suffered a serious fall and broke her hip; her close friend Ellen Demorest, for whose fashion magazine she once worked, also became ill around that same time, suffering a stroke. It seems that she never entirely recovered and, in 1900 announced that she was retiring from newspaper and club work. She made a trip back to England, to see the country of her birth after so many years away and, after returning to New York, she died of heart failure, on December 23, 1901, at the age of 72.

In 1994, she was inducted into the National Women's Hall of Fame.

== Works ==
- For Better or Worse (1875)
- Jennie Juneiana: Talks on Women's Topics (1864)
- Cookery-Book for Young Housekeepers (1866)
- Knitting and Crochet (1885)
- Thrown on Her Own Resources (1891)
- History of the Woman's-Club Movement in America (1898 and 1900)
