= Ellen Louise Demorest =

American publisher and businesswoman (1824–1898)

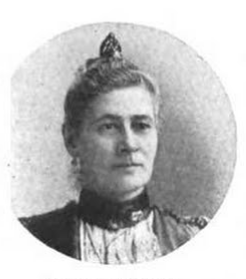
- Portrait of Demorest
- Born: Ellen Louise Curtis; November 15, 1824; Schuylerville, New York
- Died: August 10, 1898 (aged 73)
- Other name: Nell
- Occupations: Businesswoman; milliner; publisher; inventor
- Known for: Mass produced tissue paper dressmaking patterns; Demorest’s Illustrated Monthly Magazine; Mme. Demorest’s Mirror of Fashions; Founding member of Sorosis
- Spouse: William Jennings Demorest (m. 1858; died 1895)
- Children: 2

Ellen Louise Demorest (née Curtis, November 15, 1824 – August 10, 1898) was an American businesswoman, fashion arbiter, and milliner, widely credited for inventing mass-produced tissue-paper dressmaking patterns. In 1860, with her husband, William Jennings Demorest, she established a company to sell the patterns, which were adaptations of the latest French fashions, and a magazine to promote them. Her dressmaking patterns made French styles accessible to ordinary women, thus greatly influencing US fashion.

== Early life ==
Demorest was born November 15, 1824, in Schuylerville, New York. She was the second of eight children (6 girls 2 boys) born to Electra Curtis (née Abel) and Henry D. Curtis. Her father was a farmer and the owner of a men's hat factory. One of her father's eighteen siblings — Charity — (1834–1919, married to Jeremiah Shonts) was the maternal grandmother of Charles B.J. Snyder, a renowned American architect who served as Superintendent of School Buildings for the New York City Board of Education from 1891 to 1923.

At eighteen, Demorest set up a millinery shop in Saratoga Springs with the help of her father. After a year, she moved her business to Troy before relocating again to Williamsburg, Brooklyn.

She was known from girlhood as Nell.

== Career ==
Early in their marriage, the Demorests ran a Philadelphia emporium. Ellen and her sister Kate were working on a system of simplified dress making when they saw the Demorest's African-American maid cutting a dress pattern out of brown paper. Ellen was inspired by the idea to create tissue paper patterns of fashionable garments for the home sewer.

The family relocated to New York and began manufacturing patterns. In the fall of 1860, they launched a quarterly magazine, Mme. Demorest’s Mirror of Fashions. They also opened a women's fashion emporium at 473 Broadway.

Mme. Demorest’s Mirror of Fashions and Demorest’s Illustrated Monthly soon reached a circulation of 60,000. The magazine was well-timed, coming as sewing machines became common in middle-class homes. Articles in the Mirror of Fashions gave home sewers helpful tips and encouraged readers to believe in their own ability. Readers felt "emancipated... from dependence on milliners and dressmakers."

The fashions worn by Empress Eugenie were of particular interest to the readers of Demorest’s Illustrated Monthly Magazine and Mme. Demorest’s Mirror of Fashions. Correspondents reported on every dress the Empress wore and her gowns were reproduced for a semi-annual New York show.

Journalist and women's rights advocate Jane Cunningham Croly edited Demorest’s Illustrated Monthly Magazine from 1860 to 1887. Under her leadership, Demorest’s Monthly advocated for female education and employment. Croly promoted female accomplishment with a monthly "What Women Are Doing" column. The column claimed to take "note of every woman rancher, banker, dentist or businesswoman... who came to light in a distinctive way in any part of the country." Other contributors included Louisa May Alcott, Theodore Dreiser, and Robert Louis Stevenson.

In 1863, Ellen designed the wedding trousseau of circus performer Lavinia Warren.

In 1876, the year of their height in popularity, Ellen and William's company distributed and sold over 3 million patterns. Offices in Europe, Canada and Cuba distributed Demorest patterns.

== Personal life ==
On April 15, 1858, Ellen became the second wife of William Jennings Demorest, a widower, and a stepmother to the two children born to his first marriage: Vienna Willamina Demorest (1847–1913) — who married Dr. James M. Gano (1842–1895) and Henry Clay Demorest (1850–1928).

Two more children were born to Ellen Louise Demorest and W. Jennings Demorest: William Curtis Demorest (1859–1933) and Evelyn Celeste Caradora Louise Demorest (1865–1960) — who married Alexander Garretson Rea (died 1926) of Philadelphia.

== Later life and death ==
In 1876, Demorest turned her attention to philanthropy. Along with Jane Cunningham Croly, Ellen was a founding member of Sorosis, the first professional women's club in the United States.

After the death of her husband in 1895, his namesake, the Demorest Medal Contests system, was merged with that of the Woman's Christian Temperance Union (December 1897), and Mrs. Demorest was placed in charge of the Medal Department. She died a few months later, in March 1898.

== Magazines published ==
- Demorest’s Illustrated Monthly Magazine
- Mme. Demorest’s Mirror of Fashions.
